= Stefan Nerezov =

Bulgarian army general (1867–1925)

- Стефан Михайлов Нерезов
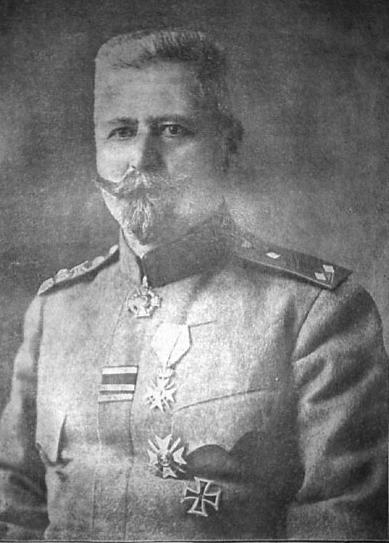
- Born: 12 November 1867; Sevlievo
- Died: 16 April 1925 (aged 57); Sofia
- Military career
- Allegiance: Bulgaria
- Branch: Bulgarian Army
- Service years: 1885 – 1920
- Rank: General of the Infantry
- Commands: 9th Pleven Infantry Division; Third Army; First Army; Chief of the General Staff of the Bulgarian Army
- Conflicts: First Balkan War; Bulgarian front; Second Balkan War; First World War; Morava Offensive; Kosovo Offensive; Battle of Doiran
- Awards: Order of Bravery; Order of St Alexander; Order of Military Merit; Iron Cross I Class; Iron Cross II Class

Stefan Mikhailov Nerezov (Bulgarian: Стефан Михайлов Нерезов) (born 12 November 1867 – 16 April 1925) was a Bulgarian General and Chief of the Bulgarian Army Staff.

== Biography ==
Stefan Nerezov was born in Sevlievo, at the time part of the Ottoman Empire. After the liberation of Bulgaria he was a volunteer in the Student's Legion during the Serbo-Bulgarian War and took part in the defense of the unification of the Principality of Bulgaria and the province of Eastern Rumelia. After the war he served for a short time as a corporal in the 12th Infantry Regiment and in 1887 he was accepted in Sofia Military School. In 1896, he graduated from the Turin Military Academy in Italy. He was assigned as a junior adjutant in the 4th Artillery Regiment.

With his return to Bulgaria he performed different duties in the General Staff of the Army and in some of the field units. In 1903 Prince Ferdinand took him in his retinue and made him Commandant of the Palace and promoted to major. In 1908 Nerezov was appointed Chief of the Operations Department of the Army Staff and as such took part in the preparations for the war against the Ottoman Empire in 1912. In 1911 he was promoted to colonel. He served as assistant chief of the Army Headquarters.

=== Balkan Wars ===
During the First Balkan War besides Chief of the Operations Department of the Army Staff he was also Assistant to the chief of the General Staff general Ivan Fichev. With the end of that war the growing tension between the former allies general Fichev, who was deeply opposed to a military solution of the disputes between Bulgaria and Serbia, preferred to resign from his post but his resignation was never accepted. Nevertheless, he did not take part in the preparation of the war. Some of his functions were assumed by colonel Nerezov. Bulgaria did not have a general plan for a war against its former allies so in May colonel Nerezov submitted his suggestions for approval by the High Command. In them, he planned a simultaneous attack by all five Bulgarian armies with the bulk of the forces directs against Macedonia while the rest drive deep into the prewar borders of Serbia in order to cut its supply and communication lines. This planned was approved but was not fulfilled as intended.

When the war began on 16 June 1913 only two of the Bulgarian armies were ordered to attack while the other three remained idle for almost one week. This and the entry of Romania in the war meant that Nerezov's plan was compromised. The Bulgarian High Command chose to withdraw the forces deployed against Old Serbia even though they had achieved success in the initial operations by taking Knjaževac and were poised to take Pirot and advance to Niš. The Bulgarians now concentrated their forces to the south and managed to completely halt the Serbian advance after the battle of Kalimanci and almost encircle the Greek Army in the battle of Kresna Gorge. These successful military operations could not prevent the Romanian Army from threatening the rear of the Bulgarian Army and reaching the vicinity of capital Sofia which forced the Bulgarian capitulation.

=== First World War ===
In 1914 colonel Nerezov took the command of the 2nd Infantry Brigade of the Ninth Pleven Infantry Division and was promoted to major general the next year and took command of the entire division. With the entry of Bulgaria in the war his division was assigned to the First Army for operations against the valleys of the rivers Timok and Morava. In the following battles the Serbian Army was defeated but managed to avoid encirclement at Kosovo Polje. With the end of the Serbian Campaign the Ninth Division arrived at the Macedonian front where it became part of the 11th German Army.

On 25 November 1916 he was appointed commander of the Third Army on the Dobrudja Front where he remained for one year. In 1917 he was appointed to command the newly created Morava Army Region in occupied Serbia.

In Summer of 1918 when the 5th Bulgarian Division was defeated at the Battle of Skra-di-Legen the Commander in Chief general Nikola Zhekov decided that a command change was needed in the First Army in order to increase the morale of its troops. General Dimitar Geshov was replaced with general Nerezov, who was described as "more healthy, more lively and more steadfast". In August he was promoted to Lieutenant General.

In September the Allies began their final offensive to knock out Bulgaria out of the war. The Bulgarian Army which was stretched on a 350 km front with all its forced arrayed in a single line had little reserves to prevent a breakthrough at the Battle of Dobro Pole. General Nerezov's First Army was attacked by the British and Greeks at the Battle of Doiran. The war ended in Bulgarian defeat and the First Army was demobilized in October 1918.

== Later life ==
After the war general Nerezov served as Inspector of the Infantry and in 1919 as Chief of the Bulgarian Army Staff. In 1920 he was promoted to General of the Infantry which was the highest rank in the Bulgarian Army and went into the reserve.

General Nerezov died on 16 April 1925 when he was killed in the St Nedelya Church assault in Sofia.

== Awards ==
- Order of Bravery, II grade and III grade,1 and 2 class
- Order of St Alexander, IV and V grade without swords
- Order of Military Merit, I grade with military decorations
- German Iron Cross
