= First Army (Bulgaria) =

- Active: 1912 – 1913; 1915 – 1918; 1941 – 1945; 1950 – 2015
- Country: Bulgaria
- Allegiance: Bulgarian Army
- Type: Field Army
- Garrison/HQ: Sofia
- Engagements: Balkan Wars; Battle of Kirk Kilisse; Battle of Lule Burgas; Chataldzha Line; Battle of Knjaževac; First World War; Serbian Campaign; Macedonian front; Second World War; Operation Frühlingserwachen; Nagykanizsa–Körmend offensive; Vienna Offensive

Commanders
- Notable commanders: Vasil Kutinchev; Kliment Boyadzhiev; Vladimir Stoychev

The Bulgarian First Army was a Bulgarian field army during the Balkan Wars, World War I and World War II.

== Balkan Wars ==
=== First Balkan War ===
Following the military reforms of 1907 the territory of the Bulgarian Kingdom was divided into three Army Inspectorates. Each of them was further divided into three division districts and in war time formed a field army.

The First Army was formed by the First Army Inspectorate, which had its headquarters in Sofia and controlled the First, Sixth and Seventh divisions. However, because of different circumstances the 7th and 6th divisions were detached from the First Army and replaced by the 3rd and newly formed 10th division, which were otherwise part of the Second Army Inspectorate. Thus after the declaration of general mobilization in September 1912 the army consisted of three infantry division and a cavalry regiment. However, only the 3rd division had its full wartime strength of three infantry brigades while the 10th division was formed by one brigade from the 1st division and another one from the 6th division. Hence it was called the "Mixed" division.

The order of battle on 4 of October 1912 O.S. was as follows:

First Army Order of Battle
	Battalions	Men	Rifles	Machine guns	Cannons
Army Staff and Services		1,439	424		
First "Sofia" Infantry Division	17	24,976	17,885	16	60
Third "Balkan" Infantry Division	25	34,991	25,106	24	72
Tenth "Mixed" Infantry Division	17	23,693	17,269	16	48
Ninth Cavalry Regiment		504	373		
Supply Trains		3,000			
Total	59	88,603	61,067	56	180

The Bulgarian plan placed the First Army commanded by Lieutenant General Vasil Kutinchev in the center of the battle line and its task was to advance rapidly, engage the main Ottoman forces positioned between Kirk Kilisse and Adrianople and position itself so it could assist both the Second Army on the right flank and the Third Army on the left flank. To achieve this as soon as the advance began the 1st Brigade of the 3rd division was temporary assigned to the Second Army while the rest of the army advanced in the space between the two fortresses. In the ensuing Battle of Kirk Kilisse, in which the Ottoman Eastern Army was defeated and retreated, the First Army bore the brunt of the fighting and suffered the greater part of the 5,745 Bulgarian casualties in that battle. The Bulgarian command ordered a couple of days' rest so that the forces can regroup before pursuing the enemy.

When the advance was renewed the First Army left behind the entire 3rd division around Adrianople to protect against attacks from the right flank. The Ottoman Army meanwhile had consolidated and reinforced itself on a new line from Lule Burgas to Bunar Hisar. The Bulgarians decided to carry out a frontal assault with the Third Army while the weakened First Army tried to enveloped the Ottoman left flank. This largest and bloodiest battle of the Balkan Wars the Bulgarians again emerged victorious and the Ottoman forces retreated in complete disorder. The heavy fighting inflicted around 20,000 casualties to the Bulgarian forces which again forced the Bulgarian command to order a couple of days' rest for the armies.

By the time the Bulgarians continued the advance the Ottoman Army had occupied the Chataldzha defensive line where it finally managed to hold its opponent after the battle on 4 and 5 November 1912.

The First and Third Bulgarian armies remained at the Chataldzha line until the end of the war and managed to repel several Ottoman attempted breakthroughs.

=== Second Balkan War ===
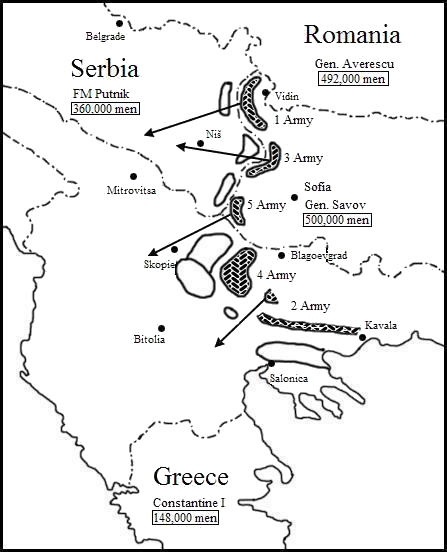
Initial Bulgarian plan of operations

In the aftermath of the First Balkan War the tensions between the allies grew significantly, as Bulgaria felt cheated out of its rightful share by Serbia and Greece. After a surprise attack ordered by Ferdinand I of Bulgaria, Serbia and Greece formed a new alliance directed against Bulgaria and the skirmishes between their troops and the much smaller Bulgarian forces that were left behind to protect their country's claims were becoming ever more frequent. In view of this situation the Bulgarian command began transferring its forces from Eastern Thrace to the western part of the country. During this time the organization of the field armies went through some major changes, including the creation of several new brigades and the formation of a new field army.

The First Army, still under the command of Lieutenant General Vasil Kutinchev, was deployed in the northwestern part of the country between Vidin and Berkovitsa, along the old border with Serbia. Its composition had changed significantly by 15 June 1913 and included two divisions, each with only two brigades, a few cavalry squadrons and an independent infantry brigade.

First Army Order of Battle
	Battalions	Men	Rifles	Cannons
Army Staff		713		
Fifth "Danube" Infantry Division	14	20,097	18,680	48
Ninth "Pleven" Infantry Division	16	26,740	22,284	32
Independеnt Brigade	8	9,139	5,782	28
Total	38	56,689	46,746	108

The Bulgarians planned to begin the war with an offensive in which the First and Third armies were to advance deep into Old Serbia and cut the communication and supply lines of the Serbian Army concentrated in Macedonia.

The conflict, however, began on 16 June 1913 when only the Fourth and Second armies were ordered to attack the Serbian and Greek armies. In the ensuing confusion for almost one week the remaining three Bulgarian armies received no orders to attack. It was only on the evening of 21 June when the First Army was ordered to advance against the town of Knjaževac and after it had occupied it to divide its forces in two with one part to be directed against Zaječar and the other one send to assist the Third army around Pirot.

Facing the First Army was the Timok Army of 31 battalions and 12 gun batteries—mostly third line infantry, commanded by colonel Vukuman Arachich. The Bulgarians managed to defeat part of these forces and occupy Knjaževac while suffering only 280 men killed and 820 men wounded.

Meanwhile, Romania had declared war on Bulgaria and its army had begun invading the northern part of the country. This new enemy threatened the rear of the First Army and forced the Bulgarian high command to order its retreat back to the border. That move had a very negative effect on the morale of the troops and even caused opened mutinies in the Ninth Division which became completely disorganized during the retreat. The situation was particularly bad in the division's Second Brigade which surrendered to the Romanian forces around Montana. The rest of the Ninth managed to retreat to Sofia and later form the Samokov detachment which took an important part in the Battle of Kresna Gorge. The rest of the army also retreated towards Sofia and took defensive positions in the Balkan mountain passes. The Serbians took advantage of this and occupied Belogradchik where they established contact with the Romanian Army. Even though by now most of northwestern Bulgaria was lost, General Kutinchev kept a few battalions in the fortress of Vidin which managed to hold off all Serbian attacks until the end of the war.

The Bulgarian high command now planned a decisive offensive operation against the Greek Army which was advancing in the Kresna Gorge. For that purpose Lieutenant General Vasil Kutinchev was assigned commander of the Second Army and the units of the First Army were transferred south to reinforce it.

A general armistice was concluded on 18 July 1913 and ten days later the Treaty of Bucharest, which stipulated immediate demobilization of the Bulgarian Army, was signed.

== First World War ==
=== Conquest of Serbia ===
With the outbreak of the Great War Bulgaria declared neutrality, as it still hadn't recovered from the losses suffered in the Balkan Wars. In 1915 activities in the diplomatic arena intensified and both the Entente and the Central powers tried to win new allies, especially in the Balkans. Bulgaria's main aim was to regain Macedonia but Serbia was unwilling to make any compromises which gave the German diplomacy a great advantage. The general military situation also favored the Central Powers—the Germans were holding firm on the Western Front and on the Eastern Front their Gorlice–Tarnów Offensive ended in major defeat for the Russians. Under these circumstances on 6 September (24 August) 1915 at the German military headquarters in Pleß Bulgaria and Germany signed a treaty of alliance. A military convention, which included Austria-Hungary as a third party and laid the plan for the conquest of Serbia, was also concluded.

In accordance with the convention Bulgaria began mobilizing and concentrating its forces its western border. For the campaign the Bulgarian high command planned to attack Serbia with two armies. The First Army under the command of Lieutenant General Kliment Boyadzhiev was deployed between the Danube and Tran. As stipulated by the military convention it was part of Army Group Mackensen together with the German Eleventh Army and the Austro-Hungarian Third Army.

On 1 October(14 October) 1915 the army had the following organization:

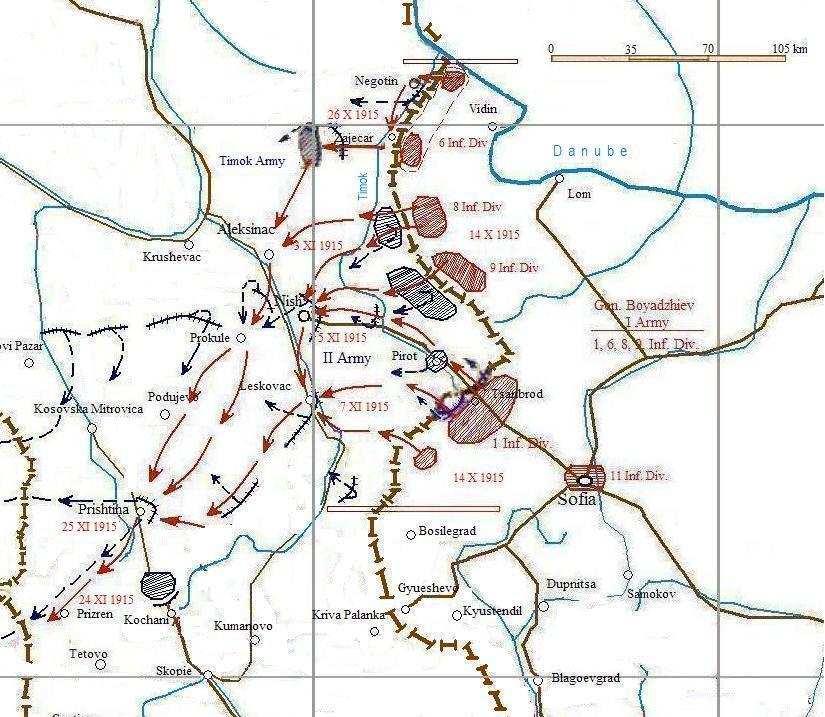
Advance of the army during the campaign

First Army composition
	Battalions	Squadrons	Men	Rifles	Machine guns	Cannons
Army Staff and Services			2,165	593		
First "Sofia" Infantry Division	23	1,5	44,270	25,921	24	111
First Cavalry Brigade	3	8	6,204	3966	8	30
Sixth "Bdin" Infantry Division	23	5,5	48,022	26,887	28	119
Eight "Tundzha" Infantry Division	23	1,5	45,978	27,146	24	88
Ninth "Pleven" Infantry Division	23	1,5	44,712	27,832	24	74
Border Guards	4		4,269	4224		
Total	99	18	195,620	116,569	108	422

The Serbians were informed about the Bulgarian war preparations by their military attaché in Sofia and the units covering the border between the two countries. Once Bulgaria declared mobilization the Serbian High Command planned a preemptive strike against the Bulgarian forces who were still concentrating and organizing on the border. For that purpose it deployed the entire Second Army, the Timok Army, the Kraina detachment and the Vlasinski detachment against the sector of the Bulgarian First Army. These were sizable forces of around 100 battalions with 90,000 rifleman, 248 cannons and 94 machine guns. In addition the Serbians also had a defensive alliance with Greece and hoped the Greek Army would also intervene. The Serbs have also asked the Entente for assistance in the form of a 150,000 strong army. Although the Entente couldn't provide the troops the Serbian army was prepared to attack Bulgaria. However, the Serb Prime Minister Pašić did not dare to attack Bulgaria over explicit opposition of all the Allied Powers (Russia, France and Great Britain).

On 1 October(14 October) 1915 Bulgaria declared war on Serbia and the First Army was ordered to begin its Morava Offensive. Its primary objectives were to push the Serbian forces out of the Timok and Morava valleys, to link up with Austro-Hungarian forces advancing from Orșova and secure the Belgrade—Sofia railway by capturing Niš, war-time capital of Serbia.

The Bulgarian Army crossed the border on October 11. But the first two weeks of the offensive the advance was slow as the divisions of the army operated independently towards achieving their individual objectives. In the southern sector the "Sofia" infantry division was engaged in heavy fighting with parts of the Serbian Second Army and failed to take Pirot. However, the Bulgarian advance in the north was proceeding more rapidly and the taking of Knjaževac by the "Tundzha" division eventually forced the Serbians to pull out of Pirot in order to avoid encirclement. This was a minor success for the Bulgarians which captured 14 cannons and c. 1,500 prisoners but the main Serbian forces were allowed to retreat in good order.

Faced with the war on several fronts the Serbian High Command decided that it is best for the army to try to hold its opponents for as long as possible and retreat slowly to the south, southwest until help arrived from the Allies who had landed in Thessaloniki. Under these circumstances the renewed drive of the Bulgarian Army faced determined resistance but it was not enough to prevent the fall of Aleksinac and on 23 October (5 November) 1915 the 9th "Pleven" division entered Niš where the Serbians had left some 42 old fortress cannons, several thousand rifles and a big amount of ammunitions, in addition around 5,000 soldiers surrendered or were captured by the Bulgarians. The Belgrade–Sofia railway was now opened for the Central Powers and a permanent land connection was established. The Serbians, however, managed to destroy the bridges of the Morava river and slowed significantly the Bulgarian First Army which spend the time between 24 and 31 October in unsuccessful attempts to cross the river. This marked the end of the Morava Offensive.

Having suffered heavy losses the Serbian Army retreated towards Kosovo where they prepared to make their last stand. The Central Powers meanwhile prepared a plan to encircle the Serbian forces. The Bulgarian High Command and the headquarters of Army Group "Mackensen" agreed to pursue relentlessly the retreating opponent, to cut its possible retreat routes through Macedonia and to undertake a decisive advance towards Pristina and prevent a Serbian retreat to the west. The plan required the Bulgarian First Army to attack from the east, a detached part of the Second Bulgarian Army from the South, the Eleventh army from the north and finally the main forces of the Third Army from the northwest while its XIX Army Corps blocks any Serbian retreat to the west. However, after the fall of Niš the Germans began pulling out some of their forces from the Balkans and the Bulgarian Sixth and Ninth divisions had been slowed by the swollen waters of the Morava and the destruction of its bridges. In these circumstances on 1 November the Central Powers began the Kosovo Offensive.

Contrary to the intentions of generalfeldmarschall Mackensen the advance of his army group proved to be difficult and slow due to bad roads, lack of supplies and the cold weather. This allowed the Serbians to gradually retreat in good order further into Kosovo and to concentrate greater forces against the Northern Operations Group of the Second Bulgarian Army in an attempt to break through and join the French and British forces advancing up the Vardar valley. In view of these events on 6 November the 8th "Tundzha" division left the First Army and was placed under the command of the Northern Operations Group while the 6th "Bdin" division was ordered to redeploy around Blagoevgrad and Dupnitsa under the direct control of the Bulgarian high command. The exhausted Serbians failed to achieve their aims and in the face of the continued advance of the Bulgarian forces towards Pristina from the east and the south ordered a general withdrawal . On 10 November the 9th "Pleven" division and the German 101st division entered the town but the successful retreat of the Serbian Army on the right bank of the river Sitnica meant that its attempted encirclement had failed. This ended the second phase of the campaign.

After the defeat in Kosovo the remnants of the Serbian Army began its retreat through Albania to the Adriatic coast. The Germans thought that the campaign was over and continued pulling out their troops from the front while the pursuit of the retreating opponent was left mostly to Bulgarian and Austro-Hungarian forces. On 24 November the 3rd "Balkan" division took Prizren and was placed under the command of the First Army. With the end of the campaign a general order for the regrouping of all Bulgarian forces was issued. The 9th division was moved to the Skopje-Prilep area, the 1st "Sofia" division was ordered to concentrate around Kratovo, where it would remain under the direct control of the Bulgarian high command. The cavalry division and the 8th "Tunzha" infantry division were also ordered to join the First Army.

=== Macedonian Front ===
With the successful conclusion of the Serbian campaign and withdrawal of the French and British expeditionary forces back to Salonika the Bulgarian armies reached the Greek border. Under the influence of the German high command they were ordered not to cross into Greek territory. The Bulgarian commander-in-chief general Nikola Zhekov remained concerned about the increasing Allied presence in Greece and insisted upon an attack on Salonika. Instead on 9 February 1916 during a meeting in the German military headquarters in Pleß he and the Chief of the General Staff von Falkenhayn agreed to begin fortifying the positions that were already taken on the Greek border and to resolve the question of an offensive latter.

Since December 1915 the Bulgarian First Army consisted of the 8th, 9th and 3rd infantry divisions and the cavalry divisions and occupied a 140-kilometer front, from Debar and Struga to the bend of the river Cherna and the Vardar. It remained part of Army Group "Mackensen", which had its headquarters in Skopje, together with the Bulgarian 5th "Danube" division, the German 4th Reserve Corps and the German 210th composite brigade which formed the Eleventh Army.

In the spring of 1916 as the Allies had finished fortifying the area around Salonica and it became obvious that no Bulgarian and German offensive was going to take place, the French and British forces moved up to the Greek border where they established contact with the Bulgarian forces. In the beginning of April the positions of the Eleventh Army were subjected to heavy artillery shelling and field marshal Mackensen requested the 9th "Pleven" infantry division to be given to that army so that it can consolidate its position. General Zhekov agreed and ordered the division to leave the First Army, join the Eleventh Army and concentrate behind the German 4th Corps.

By 1 June the Entente forces were additionally strengthened by the arrival of some 115,488 Serbian soldiers, which were organized in three corps-sized formations called armies. The Allies now had over 313,000 troops in the theater which increased the Bulgarian concerns. By July Romania was preparing to enter the war on the side of the Entente which placed Bulgaria in a difficult position facing a possible war on two fronts and in the beginning of August the French and British launched an offensive against the Bulgarian positions at Lake Dojran which convinced the Bulgarian high command that the Allies were preparing a general offensive. To counter these negative developments the Bulgarians planned an offensive of their own with both their flanks aiming to shorten the front line and influence Romania in its decision to enter the war.

The advance on the right flank was to be undertaken by the Bulgarian First Army which had the following order of battle in July 1916:

First Army Order of Battle
	Battalions	Men	Rifles	Machine guns	Cannons
Army Staff, rear services etc.		13,361	5,524		
Eighth "Tundzha" Infantry Division	22	41,376	22,538	36	48
3/6 Infantry Brigade	10	8,029	6,491	12	12
Third Cavalry Brigade		1,892	1,310		4
Third "Balkan" Infantry Division	21	42,777	26,953	36	48
Army Units (15th IR, reserves etc.)	4	7,946	7,000	20	66
German Units		1,987	987	24	12
Total	57	117,368	70,803	128	190

The Germans finally agreed that an offensive was needed and on 12 August general Boyadzhiev received his orders from the headquarters of Army Group "Mackensen". The right wing of the army, consisting of the reinforced 8th infantry division (four and half infantry brigades) was to advance and take Florina while parts of the 3rd division towards the Chegan mountain range and the village of the same name. General Boyadzhiev agreed to attack but had concerns regarding the final results of the offensive because his army was scattered on a 140 km front and lacked enough mountain and heavy artillery. Facing the Bulgarians were the six infantry and one cavalry divisions of the three Serbian armies.

The offensive began on 17 August 1916 with the Bulgarians taking Florina (Lerin), Banitsa and Kastoria. The advance, however, soon ran into difficulty and slowed down considerably due to the increased Serbian resistance. The fighting was especially heavy on the bare rocky slopes of the Chegan Mountain and the Nidže. The Serbians were constantly reinforced with new artillery and fresh troops thanks to railway that reached the battlefield while the Bulgarians soon began depleting their ammunition stocks. This and the slow advance forced the Bulgarian high command to call off all attacks on 27 August and order the forces to dig in on the occupied positions between Lake Ostrovo, Lake Petrovsko and along the ridges of the Nidže. For the next several days the Bulgarian positions were subjected to heavy artillery fire and few Serbian attacks that were repulsed. The so-called Chegan Offensive, also known as the Lerin Offensive, had failed. It failed to influence Romania, which entered the war on the side of the Allies but also failed to achieve its final military objective to take the Chegan village and the pass north of Lake Ostrovo.

General Maurice Sarrail now prepared a counterattack against the First Bulgarian Army that would eventually develop in the Monastir Offensive. The blow was to be directed against the right wing of the First Army which consisted of the Third infantry brigade of the 6th "Bdin" division, the Third cavalry brigade and the 8th "Tundzha" and First infantry brigade of the Third "Balkan" infantry division or in total about 36 infantry battalions, 74 machine guns and 35 artillery batteries. Against them were arrayed the Serbian Third Army and the divisional group of general Cordonnier.

The offensive began with the battle of Malka Nidzhe on 12 September 1916. After two days of fighting the Serbians achieved a breakthrough around Gornichevo and forced the Bulgarian 8th division to retreat. Meanwhile, the battle for Kajmakcalan also began. The fall of Florina on 23 September and the retreat of the Bulgarian First Army forced some changes in the Central Powers command structure. On 27 September general Kliment Boyadzhiev was replaced as commander of the First Army by general Dimitar Geshov. The Army itself exchanged headquarters with the Eleventh Army, now under the command of general Arnold von Winckler, and came under the new Army Group "Below", replacing Army Group "Mackensen" which was dissolved on the Macedonian Front on 30 July 1916 as field marshal Mackensen was needed in northern Bulgaria to take command of the forces concentrating for the operations against Romania. The former units of the First Army, now under German command, continued fighting around Monastir till December when the Allied offensive was finally halted.

The new Bulgarian First Army now consisted of the Fifth "Danube" Infantry Division on the western bank of the Vardar, the Ninth "Pleven" Infantry Division between the Vardar and Lake Dojran, one brigade from the Eleventh "Macedonian" Infantry Division from Lake Dojran to the Belasica Mountain. For the rest of 1916 its sector saw only secondary fighting.

On 21 April 1917 general Otto von Below was called to the Western Front and was replaced by general Friedrich von Scholtz who established a new army group bearing his name and composed of the Eleventh and First armies. During that time general Maurice Sarrail attempted a new offensive aiming to break the Macedonian front. The British were the first to attack the Ninth "Pleven" Division around Lake Dojran on 22 April. They were followed by the Serbians and the French who attack through the Cherna Loop in May. This offensive, however, proved a big disappointment as the French who took the Yarebichina peak from the Fifth "Danube" Division were driven back by the Bulgarians and the British suffered a heavy defeat in the Second Battle of Dojran. By 23 May the offensive was cancelled and the Allies began fortifying their positions in expectation of a Bulgarian counter-offensive which never came. Then for a period of almost one year there were only a few local actions along the entire front.

By 1918 the Bulgarian positions in Macedonia had deteriorated drastically as the morale of the forces decreased due to lack of supplies and ammunition. Then in May the positions of the First Army in the sector of the Fifth Division were attacked by the Greek Army, which had officially joined the Allied forces in 1917. In the ensuing Battle of Skra-di-Legen at the peak of Yarebichina the Bulgarians lost almost their entire 49th Infantry Regiment. This victory was of little strategic value to the Allies but it sapped the morale of the Bulgarian troops in the sector. After the battle general Nikola Zhekov, general Sholtz and crown prince Boris arrived at the headquarters of the Fifth Division to inquire for the causes of the defeat. They reinforced the division with the 80th infantry regiment and planned a demonstrative attack along the Struma by the Second Army in order to retake the heights. The plan, however, never went into action as the morale of the forces in the Fifth Division was so low that an attack was impossible. General Zhekov then sought to remedy the situations by replacing the commander of the First Army general Dimitar Geshov with the former commander of the Ninth "Pleven" Division general Stefan Nerezov.

Morale in some parts of the front, however, remained critical as news about German misfortunes in the Western Front reached the troops on the Balkans the few remaining German troops in Macedonia were being pulled out and the deprivations in the Bulgarian Army continued. The new commander of the Allied Salonica forces Franchet d'Espèrey planned to take advantage of this by organizing a new great offensive in Macedonia. For that purpose he gathered a force of 28 divisions or between 670,000 and 717,000 men with over 2,000 artillery pieces, 2609 machine guns and 200 airplanes. The main blow was to be delivered against the German Eleventh Army, which by now consisted almost entirely by Bulgarian units at Dobro Pole, with secondary attacks to the west around Bitola and to the east against the Bulgarian First Army at Lake Doiran .

In September 1918 the First Army had the following order of battle:

First Army Order of Battle
	Front line in km	Battalions	Machine guns	Cannons	Mine throwers
Fifth "Danube" Infantry Division	25	24	267	188	53
Mountain Division	19	9	92	69	16
Ninth "Pleven" Infantry Division	10	17	184	119	34
1/11 Infantry Brigade	12	6	64	24	
Army Reserve		7	56		
Total	57	63	663	400	103

For the operations against the Bulgarian First Army the Allied command designated the forces of general Milne. Those consisted of 4 British and 2 Greek infantry divisions or about 66 battalions with 300 artillery pieces and 400 machine guns. General Milne decided to deliver his main blow against the 9th Division while a secondary attack was planned against the 1st brigade of the 11th Infantry Division.

The Allied Vardar Offensive opened on 15 September 1918 with the Battle of Dobro Pole and after a relative short struggle a breakthrough was achieved. On the next day at Lake Doiran the Allies began a two-day artillery barrage in which more than 300,000 ordinary and gas shells were fired on the Bulgarian positions. Unlike at Dobro Pole, however, the troops in the Doiran sector preserved their high morale due to the personal inspection of the battlefield that the army commander general Nerezov made and the skilful leadership of the commander of the division general Vladimir Vazov. In addition the two commanders had regrouped their forces in such a way that a sufficient reserve of two regiments was immediately available. The modern and well build fortifications also made the casualties from the barrage extremely low. So when the Allied infantry began advancing the Bulgarians were ready to meet them with all their available forces. The result was a two-day bloody battle in which the British and Greeks suffered a heavy defeat. In fact the victory was so encouraging that general Nerezov was preparing for a counter-attack with his army supported by the neighboring Second Army which until now had remained completely inactive. In addition he could also rely on the Fourth Army, further down the Struma. In this decisive moment on 19 September the acting commander-in-chief general Georgi Todorov met with general Friedrich von Scholtz to decide what to do. The question of a counter offensive with the right wing of the Eleventh Army and the Bulgarian First Army was put forward but was quickly dismissed by the Germans as impossible. In addition no real reinforcements from them were going to arrive on time. During this period of hesitation the danger to the right flank of the First Army grew and it was finally ordered to retreat. The defeated British took advantage of this and began pursuing. In the next several days the situation deteriorated and several thousand Bulgarian soldiers revolted and headed towards Sofia and on 27 September they proclaimed the overthrow of the monarchy. During this time the Bulgarian government was under pressure from all sides and finally decided to begin negotiations so on 29 September the Salonica Armistice was concluded. The First Army was demobilized on 15 October 1918.

=== Commanders ===
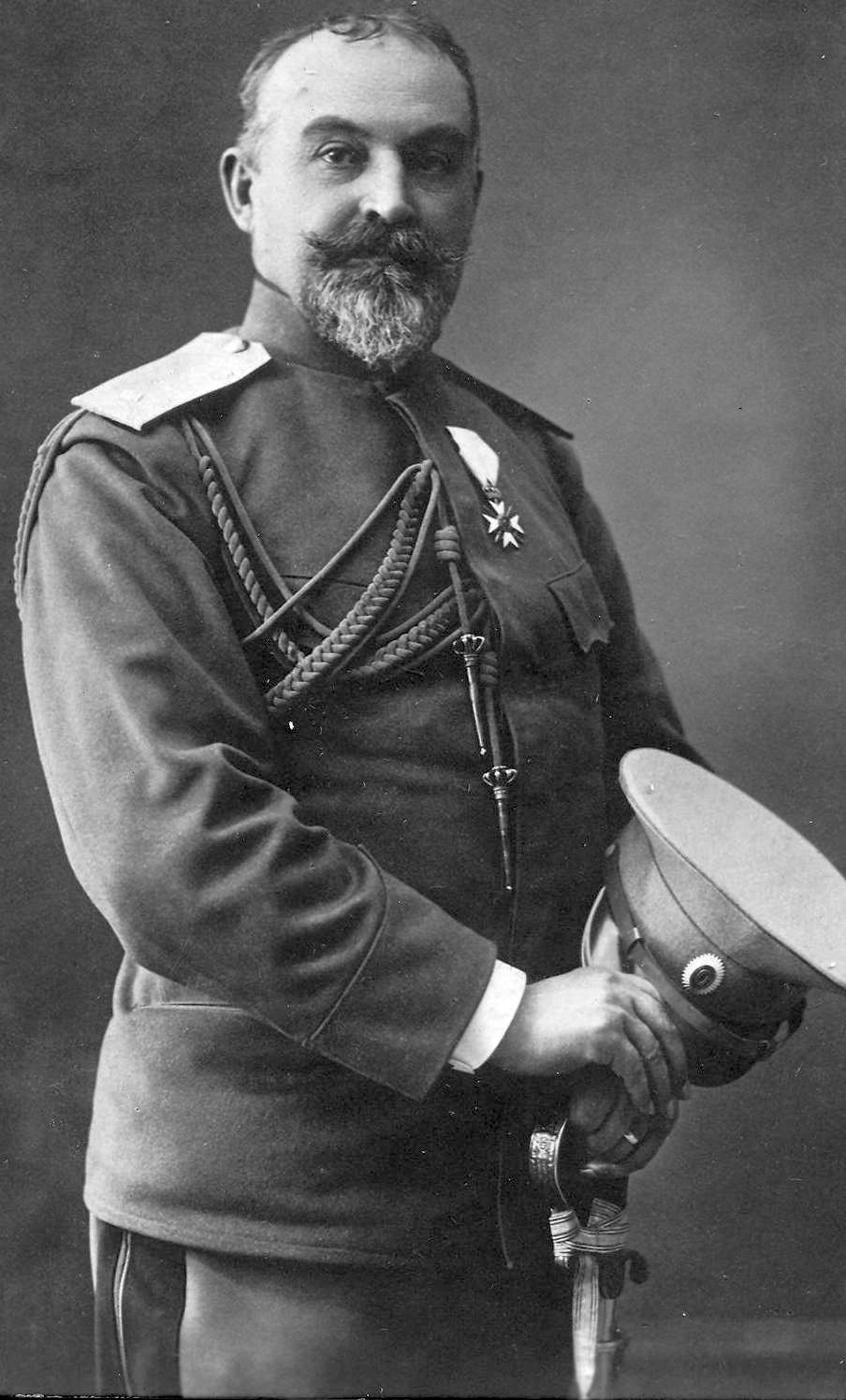
Lt. Gen. Boyadzhiev
(11.09.1915 – 25.09.1916)

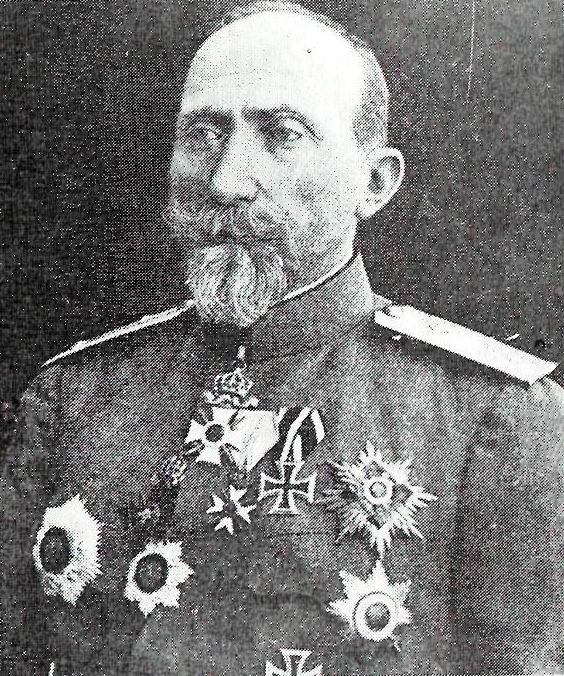
Lt. Gen.Geshov
(25.09.1916 – 30.07.1918)

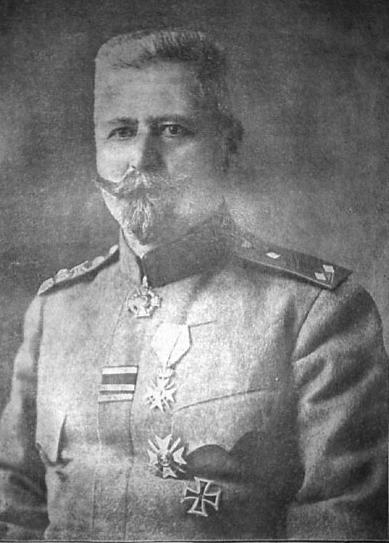
Lt. Gen. Nerezov
(30.07.1918 – 15.10.1918)

== Second World War ==
=== World War II for the Axis ===
The Kingdom of Bulgaria, under Tsar Boris III, aligned itself with Adolf Hitler's Nazi Germany, and as a result regained Southern Dobruja in the Treaty of Craiova of September 1940, and occupied Western Thrace, and much of Macedonia after the Germans invaded Yugoslavia and Greece in April 1941. In the Bulgarian Army, there were four or five field armies, including the First Army, and some 30 divisions. On 22 June 1941, the First Army included the 1st Division; the 7th Division (bg:Седма_пехотна_рилска_дивизия); two border guard regiments, a machine-gun battalion, other artillery units, engineers, and other supporting units.

In the spring of 1942, Hitler requested Boris' help controlling occupied Serbia. The Tsar allowed the Germans to use his First Army, and so the First Army began its occupation duty in Yugoslavia, where the partisan movement was already active.

=== World War II for the Allies ===
In early September 1944, the rapidly advancing Red Army reached the northern border of Bulgaria. The Bulgarians continued fighting the guerrillas in Thrace and Macedonia, but also turned their guns on the Germans. By the end of the month the First Army, together with the Bulgarian Second and Fourth Armies, was in full-scale combat against the German Army along the Bulgarian-Yugoslav border, with Yugoslav guerrillas on their left flank and a Soviet force on their right. At this time the First Army consisted of three 10,000-men divisions.

By December 1944, the First Army numbered 99,662 men. The First Army took part in the Bulgarian Army's advance northwards into the Balkan Peninsula with logistical support and under command of the Red Army. The First Army, along with the rest of the Bulgarian forces, advanced into Hungary and Austria in the spring of 1945, despite heavy casualties and bad conditions in the winter. Because of the army's equipment shortages, on March 14, 1945, the Soviets agreed to provide the Bulgarians 344 aircraft, 65 T-34 tanks, 410 guns, 115 anti-aircraft guns, 370 mortars, 370 transport vehicles, and some 30,000 small arms, all free of charge.

During 1944–45, the Bulgarian First Army was commanded by Lieutenant-General Vladimir Stoychev. On 8 May 1945, Gen. Stoychev signed a demarcation agreement with British V Corps commander Charles Keightley in Klagenfurt, southern Austria.

== Cold War ==
From 1950, the army was stationed in Sofia. During the Cold War it was reestablished, and it covered mainly the southwestern direction, opposing the Greek Army. The 3rd Army with headquarters in Sliven opposed the Turkish Land Forces' First Army, and the Bulgarian 2nd Army with its headquarters in Plovdiv was planned to support the 1st and 3rd Armies).

In 1988 the army included the:

- 1st Motor Rifle Division (Bulgaria) (Slivnitsa, Bulgaria)
- 3rd Motor Rifle Division (Bulgaria) (Blagoevgrad, Bulgaria)
- 21st Motorised Rifle Division (Bulgaria) (Pazardzhik, Bulgaria)
- 9th Tank Brigade (Bulgaria) (Gorna Banya, Bulgaria)
- 46th Missile Brigade (Samokov, Bulgaria)
- 5th Army Artillery Regiment (Samokov, Bulgaria)
- 35th Army Anti-Tank Artillery Regiment (Samoranovo, Bulgaria)
- 1st Army Anti-Aircraft Artillery Regiment

Other smaller units included the 88th Army Engineer Regiment (Kyustendil, Bulgaria); the 4th Army Communications Regiment (Sofia); the 38th Army Chemical Defence Battalion (Musachevo, Bulgaria); the 1st Cable-Layer Communications Battalion (Sofia); the 1st independent Electronic Warfare Battalion (Sofia); and the 1st Army Parachute Reconnaissance Battalion (Gorna Banya).

During a series of reforms following the dissolution of the Warsaw Pact and the end of the Cold War, the 1st Army was reformed into the 1st Army Corps, later into the West Command, comprising mainly the 9th Mechanized Brigade (Bulgaria) (in Gorna Banya) and mobilization units. With the adoption of Plan 2004 and Plan 2015 for organizational development of the Bulgarian Army forces, the command was first disbanded, later the 9th Mechanized Brigade was reformed into a brigade command with two mechanized battalions (in Gorna Banya and Blagoevgrad), and finally the brigade command was disbanded as the last successor unit of the 1st Bulgarian Army.

== Commanders ==
- Major General (Lieutenant General of August 2, 1912) Vasil Kutinchev (1912–1913)
- Lieutenant General Kliment Boyadzhiev (October 1915 – September 11, 1916)
- Major General (Lieutenant General of May 20, 1917) Dimitar Geshov (September 11, 1916 – December 1917)
- Major General (Lieutenant General of August 15, 1917) Stefan Nerezov (July 30 / October 16, 1918 – 1920)
- Colonel Rashko Atanasov (1931)
- Lieutenant-General Konstantin Solarov (since 1931)
- Lieutenant-General Nikola Mikhov (August 11, 1941 – April 11, 1942)
- Major General (Lieutenant General of May 6, 1944) Nikola Nakov (April 11, 1942 – September 13, 1944)
- Colonel (Major General of October 3, 1944, Lieutenant General of October 18, 1944) Vladimir Stoychev (September 13, 1944 – November 21, 1945)

== See also ==
- Operation Spring Awakening
- Battle of the Transdanubian Hills
- Nagykanizsa–Körmend Offensive
- Second Army
- Third Army
- Fourth Army
- 11th Macedonian Infantry Division
