= Battle of Doiran (1918) =

Battle of the Balkans Campaign of WW1

Coordinates: 41°13′N 22°45′E

- Part of Vardar Offensive (World War I)
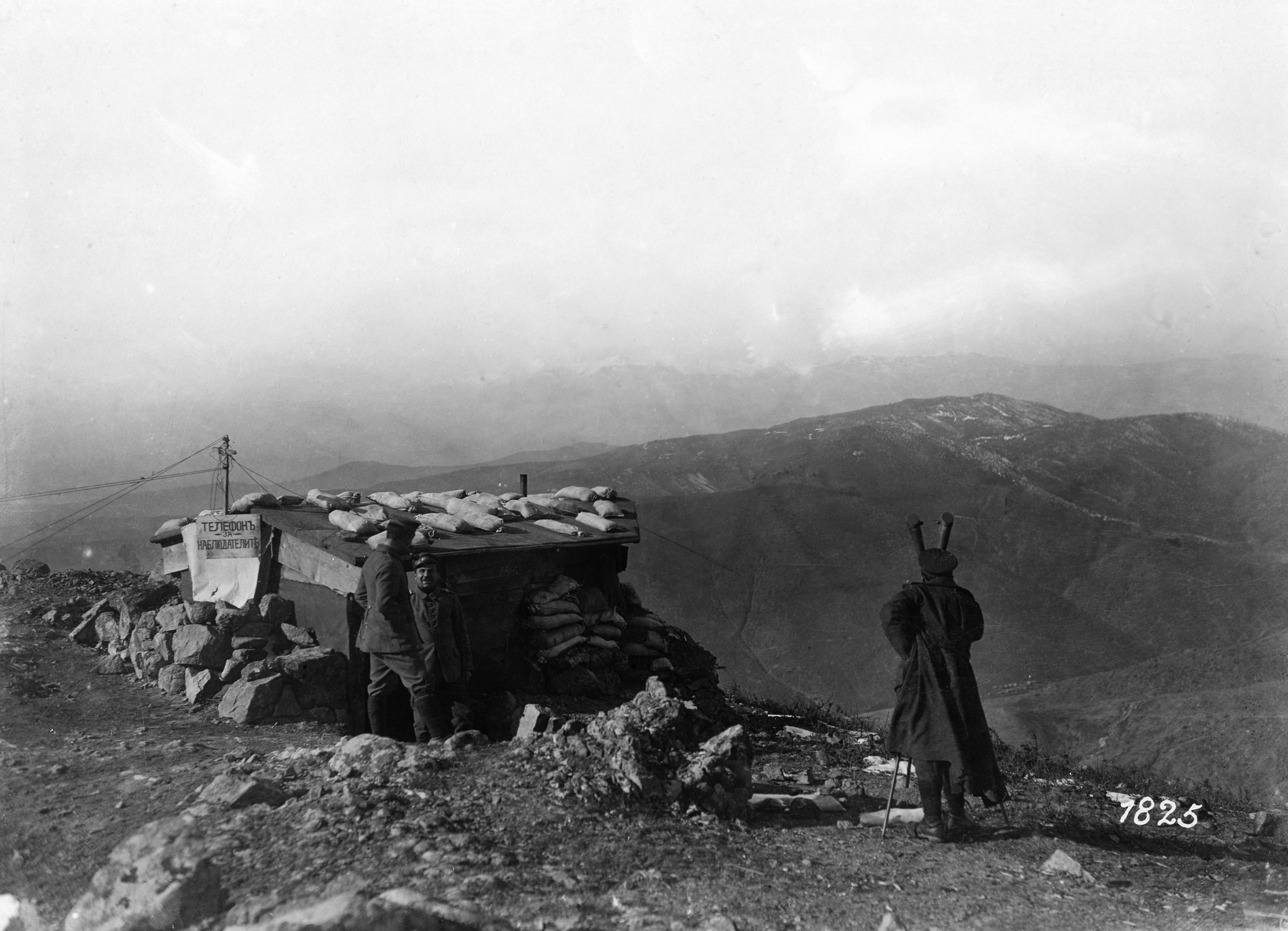
- A Bulgarian telephone station at Lake Doiran, March 1917
Date	18–19 September 1918
Location	Doiran Lake, Bulgarian-occupied Kingdom of Serbia (present-day North Macedonia)
Result	Bulgarian victory

Belligerents
Entente Powers: United Kingdom; Greece	Central Powers: Bulgaria

Commanders and leaders
(United Kingdom of Great Britain and Ireland) Henry Wilson; (United Kingdom of Great Britain and Ireland) George Milne	(Tsardom of Bulgaria (1908–1946)) Vladimir Vazov; (Tsardom of Bulgaria (1908–1946)) Stefan Nerezov

Units involved
United Kingdom: 22nd Division; Greece: Serres Division; Crete Division	Bulgaria: 9th (Pleven) Infantry Division; 1st Brigade of 11th Macedonian Infantry Division and the Mountain Division

Strength
(United Kingdom of Great Britain and Ireland) 45,672; (Kingdom of Greece) 29,328 (Note: According to the official Greek history, the strength of the Greek divisions was 416 officers, 13,519 soldiers and 3,511 animals for the Serres Division and 423 officers, 14,970 soldiers and 3,840 animals for the Crete Division. Both divisions had 16 artillery guns and 74 machine guns each, while the Serres Division had 177 light machine guns and the Crete Division 233.); Total: 75,000	(Tsardom of Bulgaria (1908–1946)) 35,000

Casualties and losses
(United Kingdom of Great Britain and Ireland) 3,155–3,871; (Kingdom of Greece) 3,404–3,948 (official numbers); Total: 6,559–7,819	(Tsardom of Bulgaria (1908–1946)) 2,726

The Third Battle of Doiran was fought from 18 to 19 September 1918, with the British and the Greeks assaulting the positions of the Bulgarian First Army near Doiran Lake. The battle was part of World War I and took place in the Balkan Theatre. The battle ended with the Bulgarians repulsing all attacks.

== Prelude ==
The British and the Greeks set off from their base at Thessaloniki at the same time as the French and the Serbians. The British and the Greeks, under the command of George Milne set off the attack on the Bulgarian positions at Doiran while the French and the Serbians under the command of Franchet d'Esperey went to penetrate the Bulgarian defences in the Vardar Valley. The British and the Greeks aimed to capture the Bulgarian positions in the hills above Doiran Lake.

This was not the first time the Allies had attacked Doiran - in 1916, an Anglo-French attempt was repulsed by the Second Thracian Infantry Division; the British had failed to capture it twice in 1917. The fortifications were well built (by Bulgarian engineers), the Bulgarians having spent the first months of 1916 and early 1917 strengthening the positions. The terrain around the area was rough, the fortifications surrounded by three miles of scrub and rocks. Part of the defences was the dangerous Pip Ridge and the Grand Couronné.

== Battle ==
On the left flank, the British XII Corps with the 22nd and 26th divisions, reinforced by the Greek Serres Division, was to attack the Pip Ridge. The British concentrated 231 pieces of artillery, including heavy 8-inch howitzers. The bombardment took place over two days, including gas shells and concluded with a rolling barrage, behind which the infantry was to advance. The British spent the time before the battle practicing for the assault. The Bulgarian 9th Pleven Division, with 122 guns, faced them in very well-prepared defences commanded by General Vladimir Vazov.

On 18 September, the British XII Corps attacked with the 66th and 67th Brigades of the 22nd Division and the Greek Serres Division. The Bulgarian first line of trenches was overrun, and the Serres Division penetrated the second line. The Bulgarians responded with heavy artillery fire and counter-attacks that recaptured the ground lost. Meanwhile, the British 66th Brigade's 7th Battalion, South Wales Borderers, lost heavily and failed in its attacks. Attacks by the 11th Welsh Regiment and 9th Border Regiment did not go well either. The British 66th Brigade's 12th Cheshire Regiment, followed by the 9th South Lancashire Regiment and 8th Kings Shropshire Light Infantry (KSLI), advanced into Bulgarian artillery and machine-gun fire. The 66th Brigade lost 65% of its soldiers. At the end of the day, the XII Corps was back at its starting point. On 19 September, the XII Corps attacked again, but because the XVI Corps attacks north of the lake had failed, the XII Corps would attack alone. The Greek Serres Division repeated the previous day's performance, taking some Bulgarian trenches, before being thrown back by heavy artillery, machine-gun fire and counter-attacks. The British attacked with the 77th Brigade, the weakened 65th Brigade, and later the French 2/2nd Zouaves regiment. The 66th and 67th Brigades were fit only for defensive duties and did not participate. The 77th Brigade took some Bulgarian trenches, but it was in an exposed position, bombarded by artillery and eventually retreated before the Bulgarians counter-attacked. It suffered about 50% casualties. The 65th Brigade's attack also failed, as did the French Zouaves.

Meanwhile, also on 18 September, the British XVI Corps attacked with the Greek Cretan Division and the British 84th Brigade in support. They faced the Bulgarian 1st Macedonian Brigade with 24 guns and 64 machine guns. The Greek division attacked with two of its regiments up front and a third in reserve, supported on its flank by the 84th. Firing in support were six batteries of British artillery, the British 85th Brigade in reserve. At 05:00, the Greeks attacked, clearing out the Bulgarian outpost line. They then had to move across a long plain to attack the Bulgarian positions on a series of hills that overlooked it. The Greeks recklessly attacked across it and penetrated the Bulgarian lines but were thrown back with heavy artillery, rifle, and machine-gun fire. The British artillery deployed behind them to provide fire support. The Greeks rallied and attacked the Bulgarian lines several more times with the same result as the first time. By the evening, the Greeks withdrew, followed a few hours later by the British artillery. The XVI Corps did not attack on 19 September due to casualties. The attack failed due to the lack of artillery support, problems with inter-unit communication and the reckless first attack by the Greeks.

== Casualties ==
The Allies' losses totalled between 6,559 and 7,819 British and Greek soldiers, against 2,726 for the Bulgarians. Most of the British and Greek losses were to the XII Corps and Serres Division, with less than 1,000 coming from the XVI Corps and Cretan Division.

Greek casualties on 18 and 19 September
Unit	Killed	Wounded	Missing	Total
1st Serres Regiment	35	481	86	602
2nd Serres Regiment	178	563	176	917
3rd Serres Regiment	146	669	353	1,168
8th Cretan Regiment	5	33	0	38
9th Cretan Regiment	92	285	0	377
29th Infantry Regiment	47	255	0	302
Total	503	2,286	615	3,404

Bulgarian casualties and expended material.
Unit	Men				Expended Material							Trophies		
Unit	Killed	Wounded	Missing	Total	Rifle Rounds	MG Rounds	Hand Grenades	Flare Rockets	Mines	Artillery Shells	Damaged Guns	Prisoners	MGs	Automatic Rifles
57th Regiment	8	30	6	44	–	–	–	–	–	–	–	25	2	5
33rd Regiment	140	263	17	420	509,000	441,000	13,200	3,800	2,157	–	–	198	23	48
17th Regiment	214	439	432	1085	–	–	–	–	–	–	–	227	27	52
58th Regiment	57	84	711	852	–	–	–	–	–	–	–	60	12	26
34th Regiment	45	85	1	131	–	–	–	–	–	–	–	–	–	–
4th Regiment	5	20	0	25	–	–	–	–	–	–	–	33	3	14
Artillery	23	28	13	64	–	–	–	–	–	64,752	18	–	–	–
Pioneers	16	21	–	37	–	–	–	–	–	–	–	–	–	–
Flame/Mine Throwers	10	28	30	68	–	–	–	–	–	64,752	–	–	–	–
Total	518	998	1,210	2,726	1,500,000	2,000,000	40,000	10,000	6,000	64,752	18	542	67	145

== Retreat ==
Several days after the battle, the British realized the Bulgarian fortifications were quiet. The British and Greek forces advanced only to find the Bulgarian positions abandoned. The French, Serbians and Greek forces had defeated part of the Bulgarian army during the Battle of Dobro Pole in the Vardar valley and were advancing towards Doiran. This prompted the command of Army Group Scholtz to order the Bulgarian First Army to retreat so that it would not be cut off from the rear. The British were weary and pursued slowly, and Bulgarian rear guards fought well enough to allow the rest of their troops to get away. The British Royal Air Force did attack the retreating Bulgarian columns, inflicting some casualties.

== Aftermath ==
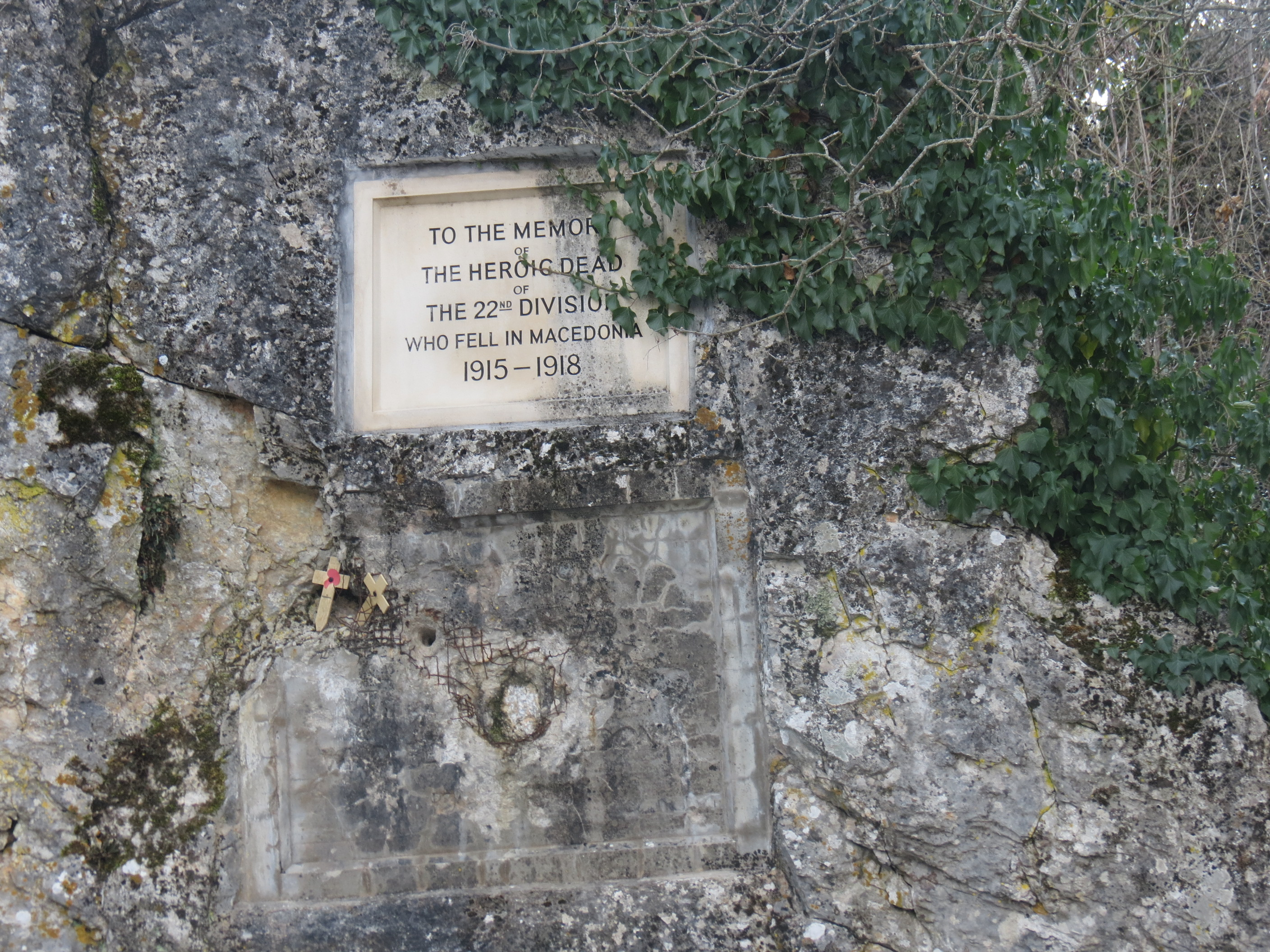
Monument to the British 22nd Division in Star Dojran, Republic of North Macedonia.

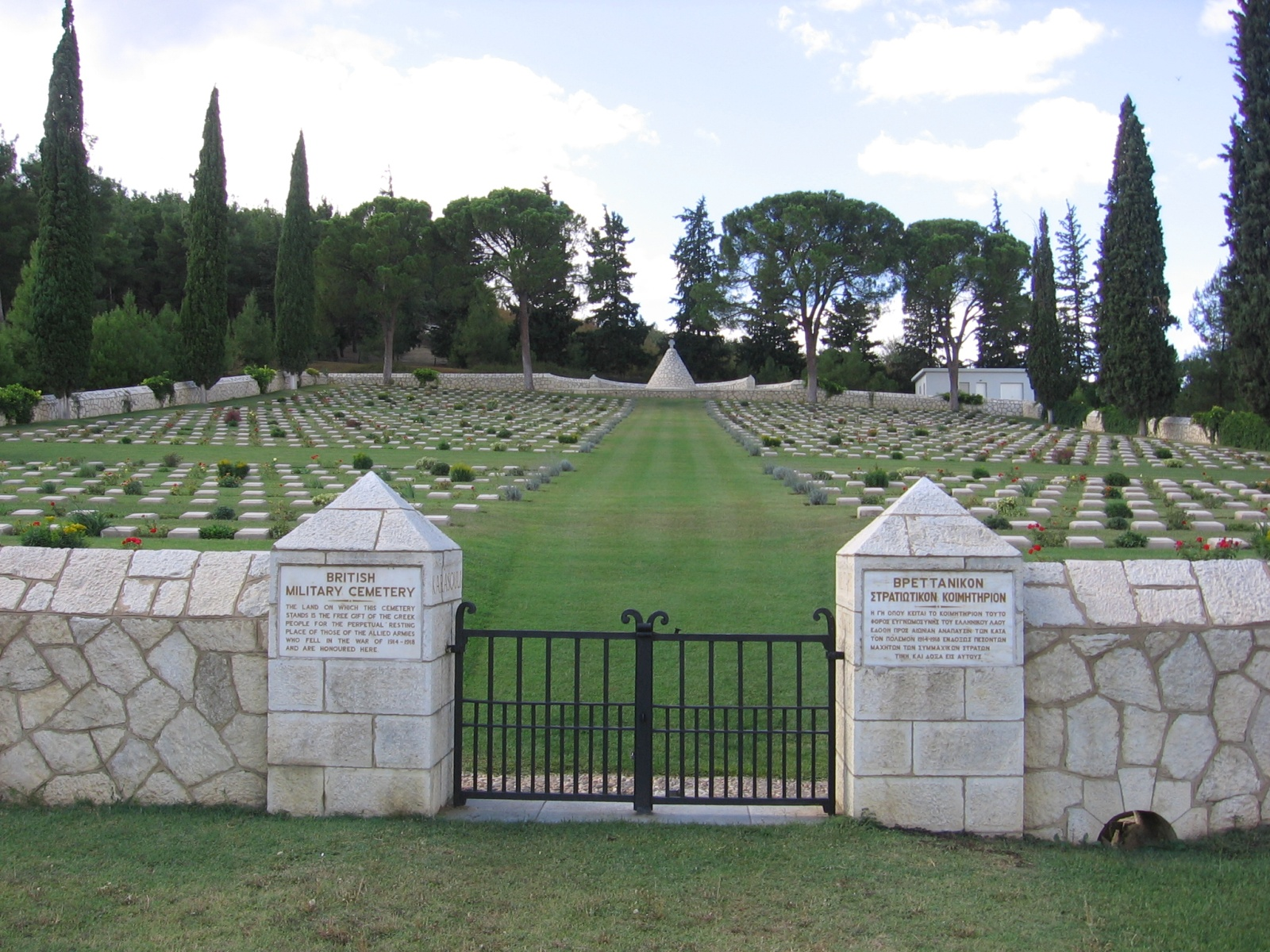
1914–1918 British Military Cemetery in Polykastro (formerly Karasouli) near Lake Doiran.

The Allies continued to advance into Bulgarian-held territory, and some of the Bulgarian army had mutinied and was threatening Sofia. On 30 September, the Bulgarians surrendered to the Allies in Thessaloniki to avoid occupation. The British paid great honour to General Vladimir Vazov when in 1936, he arrived in Victoria Station in London by lowering the flags of all their regiments who participated in the battle. The chairman of the British legion Major Goldy said in his speech: "He is one of the few foreign officers whose name features in our history."

== See also ==
- Macedonian front (World War I)

== Sources ==
- AJP Taylor. History of World War I. ISBN 0-7064-0398-3
- Falls, Cyril Bentham (1935). Military Operations Macedonia. From the Spring of 1917 to the End of the War. History of the Great War based on Official Documents. London: His Majesty’s Stationery Office.
- Peychev, Atanas (1981). 1300 godini na strazha [1300 Years on Guard] (in Bulgarian). Sofia: Voenno izdatelstvo.
- Wakefield, A.; Moody, Simon (2004). Under the Devil's Eye; Britain's Forgotten Army in Salonika, 1915–1918. ISBN 0-7509-3537-5.
- Nedev, Nikola (2009) [1923]. Doyranskata epopeya 1915–1918 [The Doiran Epic 1915–1918] (in Bulgarian). Sofia: Pechatnitsa na Armeyskiya Voenno-Izdatelski Fond. ISBN 978-954-8247-05-4.
- Пейковска, П., Печатът за участието на 34-и Пехотен Троянски полк в боевете при Дойран [The Press on the Participation of 34th Troyan Infantry Regiment in the Battle of Doiran]. - В: Културно-историческо наследство на Троянския край. Vol. 7, Троян, 1994, pp. 119–129. http://ivanpeykovski.blogspot.com/2013/01/34.html
