= Battle of Florina =

1916 battle during the First World War

Coordinates: 40.7833°N 21.4000°E

- Part of Macedonian front (World War I)
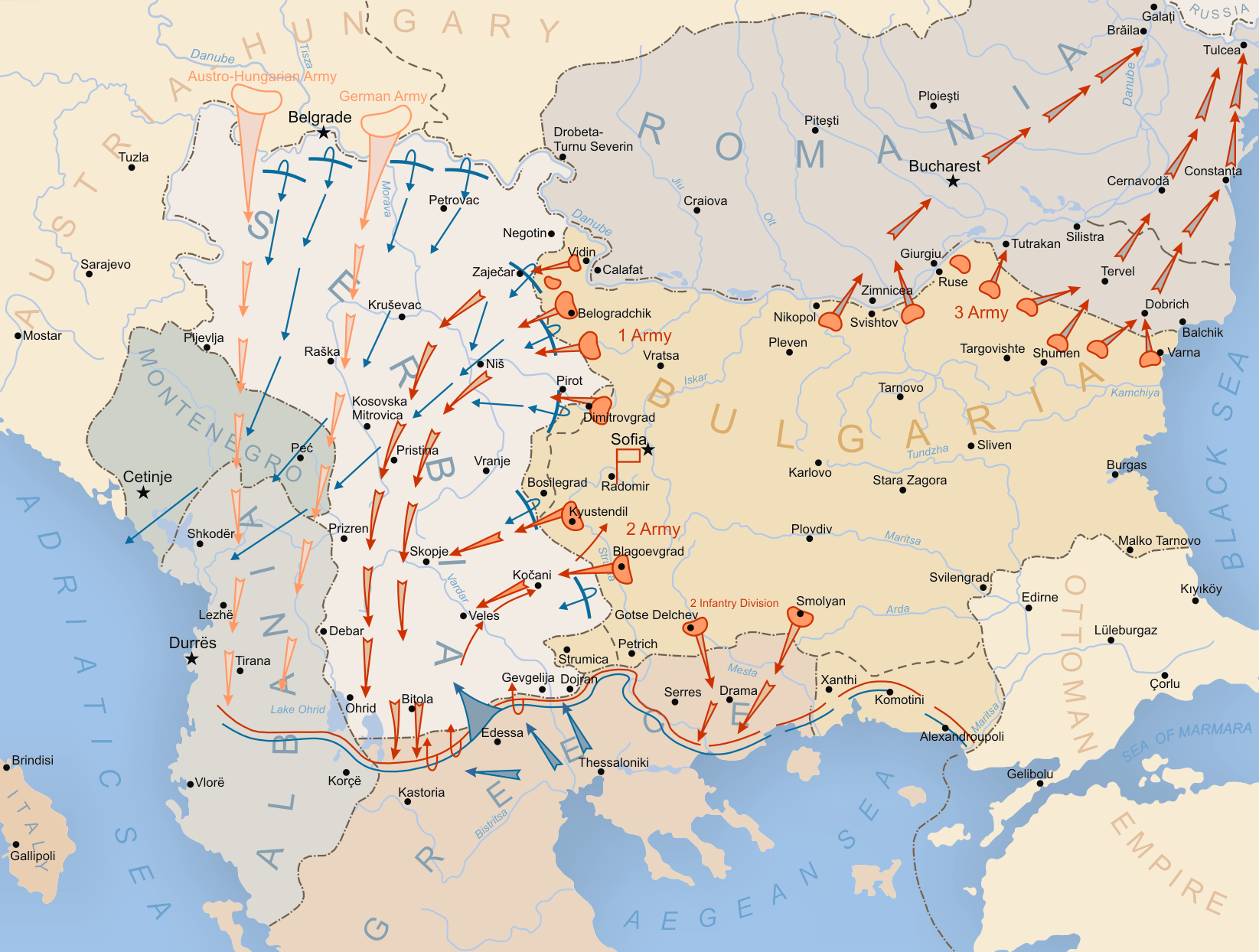
- Battle of Lerin (to the south-west)
Date	17–28 August 1916
Location	around Florina, Kingdom of Greece (present-day Greece)
Result	Minor Bulgarian victory; The Bulgarians capture Florina; Bulgarian advance stopped

Belligerents
Bulgaria	Serbia

Commanders and leaders
(Tsardom of Bulgaria (1908–1946)) Kliment Boyadzhiev	(Kingdom of Serbia) Pavle Jurišić Šturm

Units involved
(Tsardom of Bulgaria (1908–1946)) First Army	(Kingdom of Serbia) 3 Corps (Note: These units were labelled as field armies, but were, in fact, corps-sized formations)

Strength
117,368; 190 field guns; 128 machine guns	124,000

Casualties and losses
5,478 killed/wounded; Total: 5,478	657 killed; 2,555 wounded; 706 missing; Total: 3,918

The Battle of Lerin or Battle of Florina or Chegan offensive was an offensive operation of the Bulgarian army fought between 17–28 August 1916, during the First World War, in which they conquered the city of Florina (in present-day Greece, but known in Bulgaria as Lerin) but failed to take Chegan.

== Background ==
In August 1916, Romania chose to join the war effort on the side of the Entente. The Allies planned a large offensive in the Macedonian front for the middle of August to support Romania's entry into the war and pin down as many Bulgarian forces as possible. The Bulgarian high command suspected an impending offensive, and the fighting around Doiran that erupted on 9 August only confirmed these suspicions. On their part, the Bulgarians had urged for an offensive in Macedonia since the beginning of the year, now planning a strike with the First Army and Second Army on both Allied flanks.

The Struma operation on the eastern flank by the Bulgarian Second Army under General Todorov was a huge success, mainly because the Greek government ordered their troops not to resist.

== Chegan operation ==
The advance on the right flank was to be undertaken by the Bulgarian First Army, which had the following order of battle in July 1916:

First Army Order of Battle
	Battalions	Men	Rifles	Machine guns	Cannons
Army Staff, rear services etc.		13,361	5,524		
Eighth "Tundzha" Infantry Division	22	41,376	22,538	36	48
3/6 Infantry Brigade	10	8,029	6,491	12	12
Third Cavalry Brigade		1,892	1,310		4
Third "Balkan" Infantry Division	21	42,777	26,953	36	48
Army Units (15th IR, reserves etc.)	4	7,946	7,000	20	66
German Units		1,987	987	24	12
Total	57	117,368	70,803	128	190

The Germans finally agreed that an offensive was needed, and on 12 August general Boyadzhiev received his orders from the headquarters of Army Group "Mackensen". The right wing of the army, consisting of the reinforced 8th infantry division (four and a half infantry brigades,) was to advance and take Lerin while parts of the 3rd division towards the Chegan mountain range and the village of the same name (today known as Agios Athanasios, to the north-west of Lake Vegoritida (Lake Ostrovo), in the Greek regional unit of Pella). General Boyadzhiev agreed to attack but had concerns regarding the final results of the offensive because his army was scattered on a 140 km front and lacked enough mountain and heavy artillery. The six infantry and one cavalry divisions of the three Serbian armies faced the Bulgarians.

The offensive began on 17 August 1916, with the Bulgarians taking Lerin and Banitsa. However, the advance soon encountered difficulties, slowing down considerably due to the increased Serbian resistance. The fighting was especially heavy on the bare rocky slopes of Chegan Mountain and the Voras Mountains. The Serbians were reinforced with new artillery constantly and fresh troops thanks to the railway that reached the battlefield, while the Bulgarians soon began depleting their ammunition stocks. This and the slow advance forced the Bulgarian high command to call off all attacks on 27 August and order the forces to dig in on the occupied positions between Lake Vegoritida, Lake Petron and along the ridges of the Voras Mountains. For the next several days, the Bulgarian positions were subjected to heavy artillery fire and a few Serbian attacks that were repulsed.

== Consequences ==
The Chegan Offensive also known as the Lerin Offensive had failed. It failed to influence Romania, which entered the war on the side of the Allies but also failed to achieve its final military objective to take the Chegan village and the pass north of Lake Vegoritida.

French General Maurice Sarrail now prepared a counterattack against the First Bulgarian Army that would eventually develop in the Monastir Offensive. The French retook Lerin/Florina on 23 September 1916.

== Sources ==
- Falls, Cyril Bentham (1933). Military Operations Macedonia. From the Outbreak of War to the Spring of 1917. History of the Great War based on Official Documents. London: His Majesty’s Stationery Office.

== See also ==
- First Army (Bulgaria)
