= Army Group Mackensen (Serbia) =

The Army Group Mackensen (German: Heeresgruppe Mackensen) which operated in Serbia between 18 September 1915 and 11 October 1916 during World War I under the command of field marshal Mackensen, was an Army Group of the German Army.

It was renamed on 12 October 1916 to Army Group Below and on 23 April 1917 to Army Group Scholtz, according to its new commander.

== 1915–1916 ==
This Army Group was established in September 1915 to invade Serbia. The invasion began on 7 October 1915 and by the end of January 1916, the whole of Serbia, Montenegro and the largest part of Albania were in the hands of the Central powers. After that, the front stabilized on the Greek - Macedonian Border.

=== Composition October 1915 ===
- (German Empire) Eleventh Army (Max von Gallwitz)
- (Bulgaria) First Army (Kliment Boyadzhiev)
- (Austria-Hungary) Third Army (Hermann Kövess von Kövessháza)

The Bulgarian Second Army under (Georgi Todorov), also participated in the invasion, but remained under the direct control of the Bulgarian high command.

== 1916–1918 ==
On 30 July 1916, Field Marshal Mackensen left for the Romanian Front and the Army Group was temporarily commanded by the Bulgarian High Command.

On 12 October 1916, Otto von Below became the new commander and the Army Group was renamed Army Group Below (German: Heeresgruppe Below). On 23 April 1917, von Below was replaced by Friedrich von Scholtz, and the Army Group was again renamed Army Group Scholtz (German: Heeresgruppe Scholtz).

=== Composition 1916 - 1918 ===
- German Eleventh Army (Arnold von Winckler, succeeded by Kuno von Steuben)
- Bulgarian First Army (Kliment Boyadzhiev, succeeded by Dimitar Geshov)
