= Kosovo offensive (1915) =

Part of the Serbian campaign of World War I

- Part of Serbian Campaign (World War I)
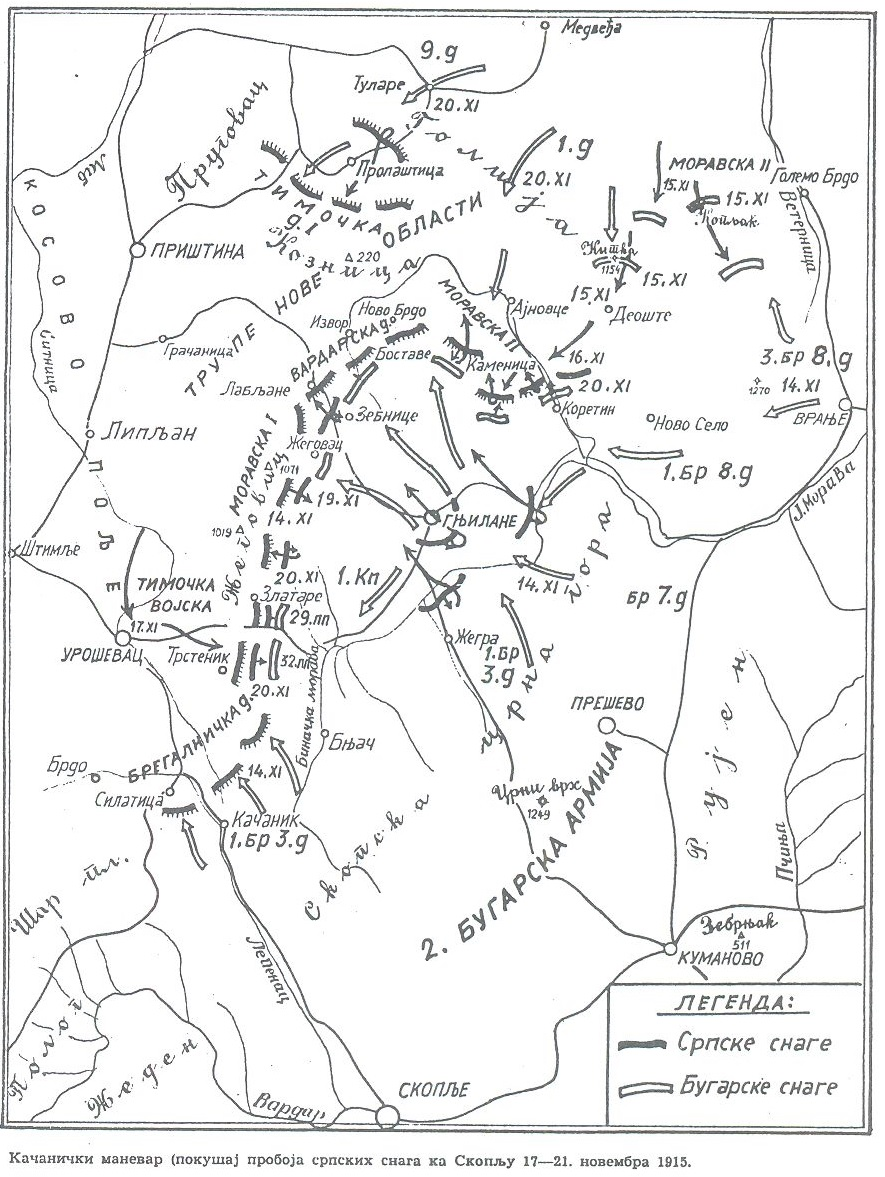
- A map of the region with the Serbian attempt to break toward Skopje between 17 and 21 November 1915.
Date	10–24 November 1915
Location	Kosovo, Southeastern Serbia 42°22′56.69″N 19°58′51.29″E
Result	Central Powers victory

Belligerents
Germany; Austria-Hungary; Bulgaria	Serbia

Commanders and leaders
(German Empire) August von Mackensen; (German Empire) Max von Gallwitz; (Austria-Hungary) H. K. von Kövessháza; (Tsardom of Bulgaria (1908–1946)) Kliment Boyadzhiev; (Tsardom of Bulgaria (1908–1946)) Georgi Todorov	(Kingdom of Serbia) Radomir Putnik; (Kingdom of Serbia) Petar Bojović; (Kingdom of Serbia) Živojin Mišić; (Kingdom of Serbia) Stepa Stepanovic; (Kingdom of Serbia) Pavle Jurišić Šturm

Strength
(German Empire) Army Group Mackensen: (German Empire) 11th Army; (Austria-Hungary) 3rd army; (Tsardom of Bulgaria (1908–1946)) 1st Army; (Tsardom of Bulgaria (1908–1946)) Northern Operations Group of Second Army; 156,000 Austro-Germans; (79,000 combatants, 372 cannons and 220 machine guns)	130,000 (Note: On 11 November, German intelligence had estimated the strength of Serbia's forces before the start of the campaign at about 300,000. About 60,000 had been captured, and another 90,000 killed or wounded. Of the 150,000 remaining, 130,000 faced Mackensen's forces at most.) to 150,000

The Kosovo offensive of 1915 (Bulgarian: Косовска настъпателна операция; German:Verfolgungskämpfe im Kosovo) was a World War I offensive launched as part of the Serbian campaign of 1915. It involved the Central Powers (German, Austro-Hungarian, and Bulgarian units under the command of Prussian Field Marshal Mackensen) and the Kingdom of Serbia.

It was conducted in the southwest corner of Serbia, in the historic site of the medieval battle of Kosovo, where the three Serbian armies, overwhelmed by the combined strength of their enemies, had retreated during the second half of November 1915. The ultimate goal of the Central Powers offensive was to encircle and destroy the Serbian army in a decisive final battle; as the offensive progressed the Serbs retreated over the snow-clad Montenegrin and Albanian mountains to the Adriatic coast.

The Kosovo offensive of 1915 resulted in a decisive victory for the Central Powers, leading to the occupation of Serbia by Austria-Hungary and Bulgaria and to a significant shift in the balance of power in the Balkans during World War I.

== Background ==
On 6 October 1915, less than a year after Serbia marked the first Allied victory of World War I and humiliated its powerful neighbour, the Austro-Hungarian Third Army, the Eleventh German Army, as well as General Sarkotić's army from Bosnia, began the fourth invasion of Serbia. The overwhelming superiority in heavy artillery, as well as the weight of numbers, quickly overwhelmed the Serbian army who started streaming southwards towards Kragujevac and Niš; five days later, the Serbs were caught by surprise when the Bulgarian First and Second Armies invaded Serbia from the east, cutting the rail line that ran north from Salonika and depriving Serbia of reinforcements and artillery ammunition. The Serbian high command was forced to transfer its all-important Second Army from the northern front to defend this border. Despite a tenacious defense that caused the enemy to advance slower than anticipated, the pressure of the Austro-Hungarians, the Germans, and the Bulgarian First Army in the north and the Bulgarian Second Army advancing from the east forced the Serbs to retreat in a southwesterly direction into Kosovo.

== Prelude ==
The Serbs gradually withdrew, continuing fierce resistance, hoping for the Allies' aid as British and French forces had landed in Salonika. Though the British were reluctant to send their troops into Serbia, a French contingent of two divisions, commanded by General Maurice Sarrail, made a tentative advance up the Vardar Valley into Serbia. After being pushed back by the Bulgarian Second Army, the French were forced to pull back towards the Greek border. Three British brigades came under increasingly heavy attacks and were forced back into Greece as well. The Bulgarian forces stopped at the border. On 23 October, the Bulgarian Second Army entered Skopje and Veles on the Vardar River, then started pushing northwestward to Kosovo. In doing so, the Bulgarians both blocked the retreat of the Serbs to the south along the Vardar Valley and cut them off from the oncoming French forces. The Serbian high command had to accept that there was no prospect of the Allies forces reaching them.

Mackensen believed that the Serbian forces could still be surrounded and destroyed. He had hoped that the Serbs would make a stand at Kragujevac, but on 31 October, it became clear that Putnik had decided to withdraw further. While determined rearguards held off the forces pressing down on him from the north, the Serbian Chief of the General Staff ordered the rest of the army to pull back toward Kosovo. Mackensen chose to order a vigorous pursuit in the Ibar Valley, intending to encircle and fight a decisive final battle against the Serbs in the Kosovo area near Priština, known as the "Field of Blackbirds."

== Offensive ==
On 5 November, the Bulgarian 9th Infantry Division reached and cut the main road running south through Niš and made contact with General Gallwitz's Eleventh German Army. On 6 November, the Forty-Third Reserve Infantry Division, commanded by Generalmajor Hermann von Runckel, moved quickly to gain control of the area south of Kraljevo, which the Serb Government had abandoned two days earlier, putting the Germans in a position to gain entrance to the Ibar River valley.

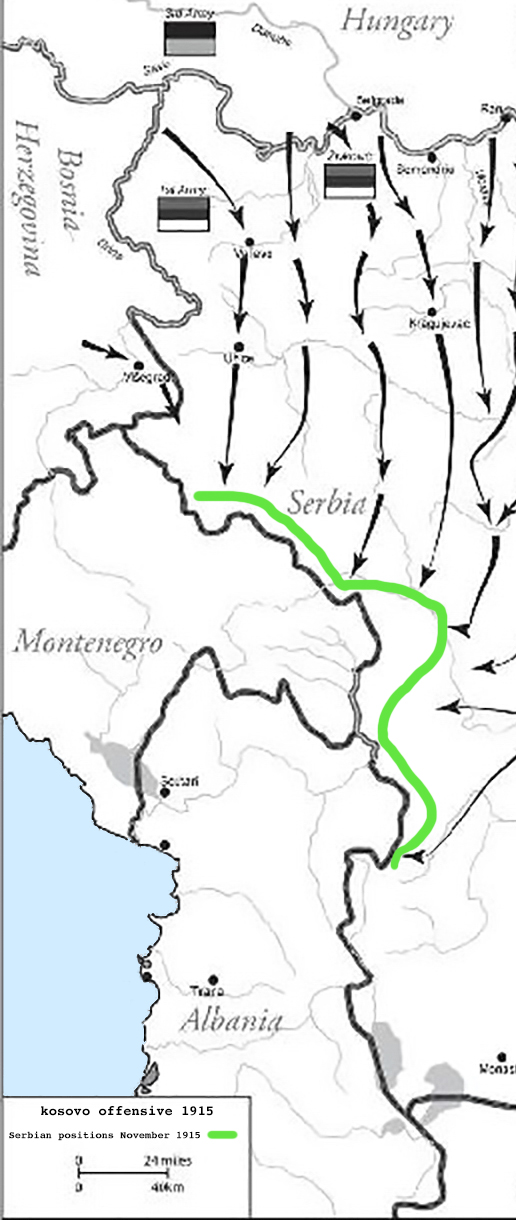
Positions of Serbian forces during the Kosovo offensive (in green)

Mackensen ordered an all-out pursuit by the Bulgarians southwest toward Priština. However, the Bulgarian First Army was having difficulties in getting all of its units across the West and South Morava Rivers. On 10 November, the Bulgarian First Division was able to cross the South Morava at Leskovac, about 18 miles south of Niš, but a Serbian force consisting of the Timok I, Šumadija II, and Morava II Divisions were able to mount a successful counterattack, driving the Bulgarians back toward Leskovac; using this respite, the Serbians continued their retreat toward Priština. On 11 November, the Bulgarian First Army, after taking Niš, established contact with the German X Reserve Corps, and then turned to the southwest toward Kosovo in pursuit of the retreating Serbs. For two days, the greatly outnumbered Serbian army held Prokuplje but eventually had to retreat.

The Germans undertook the most direct pursuit of the Serbians with an expanded X Reserve Corps with the 107th Infantry Division attached to Prussian General Kosch's command. Kosch's route took his corps across the Jastrebac Mountain. The passes through the mountain were few, and roads were often nothing more than muddy tracks. Nonetheless, Kosch's lead elements were able to seize the passes from the Serbian Drina II Division on 13 November. As the weather improved slightly in early November, reconnaissance flights were able to keep Mackensen and his commanders apprised of Serbian movements.

As the Germans and their allies advanced, the Serbians retreated. Although the loss of Niš, Kragujevac, Kruševac, and Kraljevo had cost the Serbians a tremendous quantity of equipment and had made a retreat inevitable, the Serbian army retained its organizational integrity as its rearguards managed to hold off the advancing forces of the Central Powers. The Serbian armies reached Priština and Kosovo ahead of their pursuers. The Serbians had also taken a large number of Austro-Hungarian prisoners with them, and there were also a great many civilian refugees. The Serbians had two courses open to them, fight or retreat. Buoyed by the recent successful counterattack against the Bulgarians at Leskovac, making a final stand on the Field of Blackbirds also resonated with Serbians from a historical and national standpoint, (Note: The "Field of Blackbirds" was the site of a famous battle in 1389 between the Serbs and an invading army of the Ottoman Empire; it later became the birthplace of Serbian nationalism.) but a retreat to Prizren and from there across the mountains to the Adriatic coast where the army could rest and refit was the chosen course of action. Putnik gave the order to retreat on 22 November.

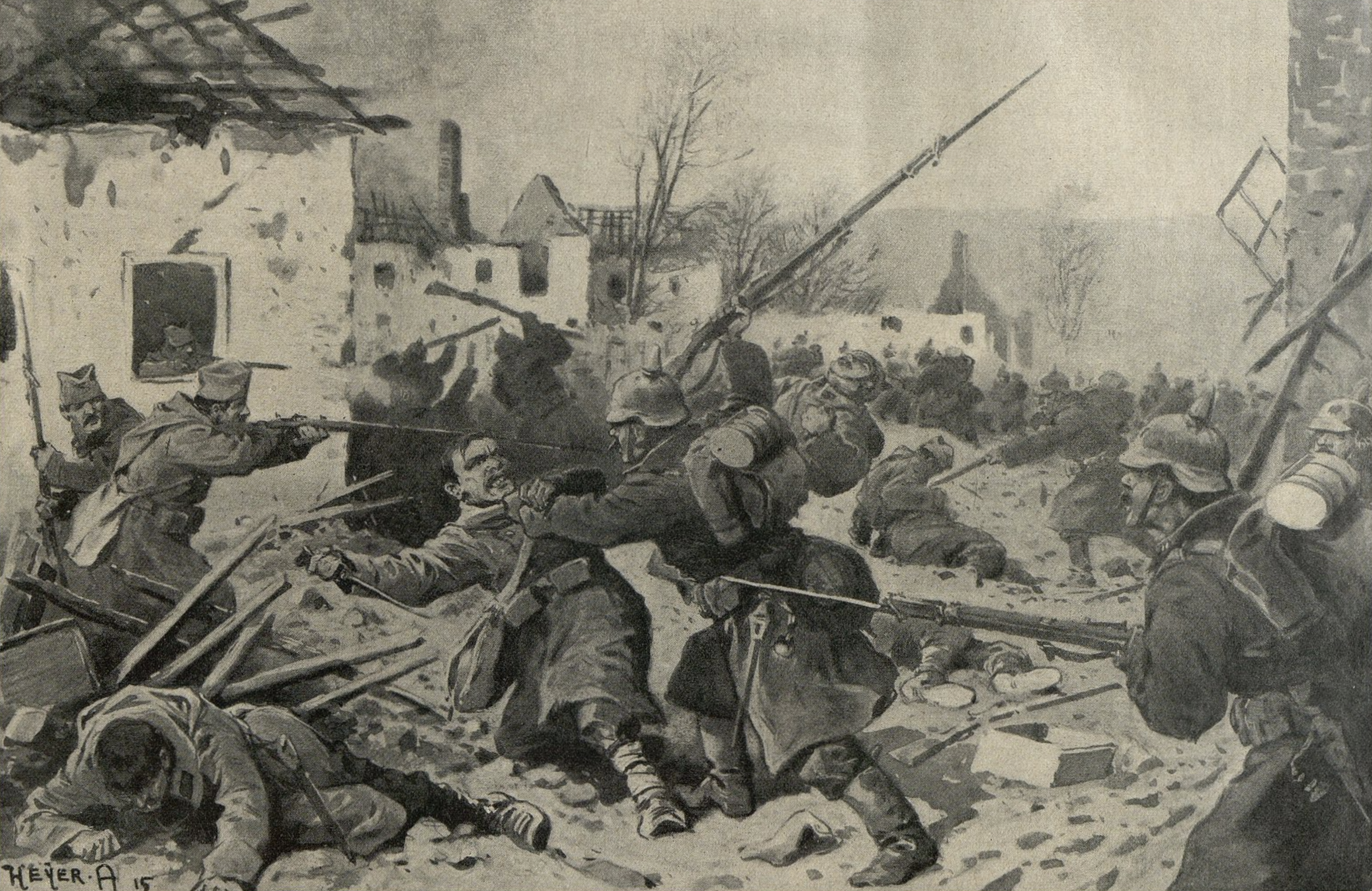
The capture of Kuršumlija on November 17 1915 (German illustration)

On 23 November, the Austro-Hungarian Fifty-Ninth Infantry Division reached Mitrovica. The same day the German IV Reserve Corps and the Bulgarian Ninth Division, having fended off a last Serbian counterattack toward Vranje and Kumanovo, reached the Field of Blackbirds and Priština, securing both the next day. Large numbers of prisoners and a fair amount of booty were taken in both places, including in Novi Pazar. However, most of the Serbian army had already withdrawn to Kosovo, managing to escape the enemy's attempts to encircle them and force them to surrender.

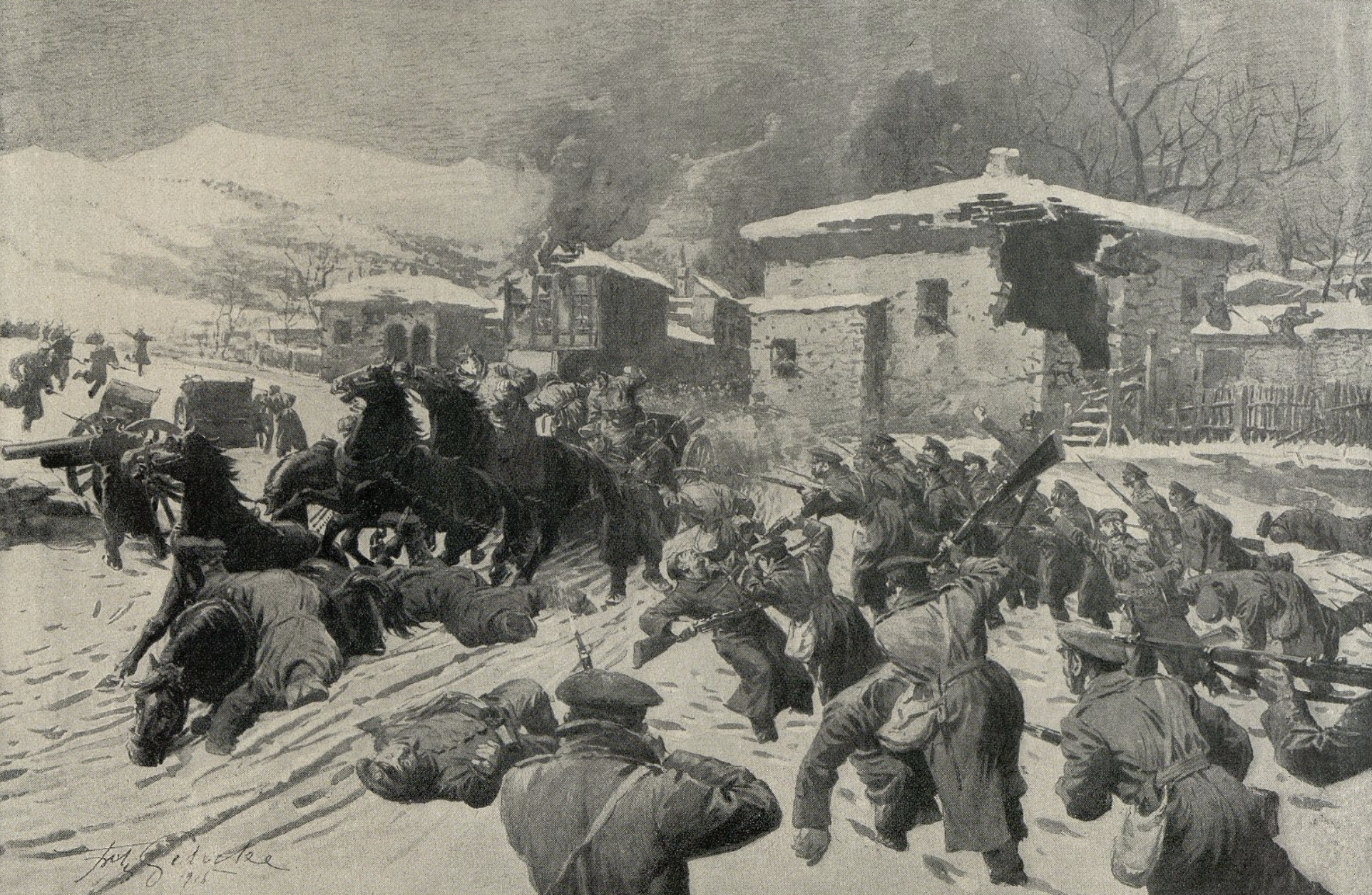
German and Bulgarian troops in the battle for Pristina on November 23 1915 (German illustration)

However, the ultimate prize that Mackensen and Seeckt sought eluded them as Serbian forces, followed by refugees, had retreated to Prizren and headed toward the Adriatic coast. Although a pursuit to Prizren was conducted, that was left mainly to the Bulgarians. Conditions would not support the use of large forces. The IV Reserve Corps in Priština had to go on half rations. The Austro-Hungarian Tenth Mountain Brigade found its route south from Ribaric blocked by a 4,921-foot high mountain with a completely iced-over track as the only way through. The brigade had already lost 30 men who had frozen to death in the harsh conditions.

Confronted by these stark realities, Mackensen declared an end to the campaign on 24 November 1915. Berlin declared the campaign over on 28 November. All of old Serbia had been overrun, and after only three years, Kosovo was once more in the grip of an invader.

On 25 November, the Serbian High Command issued its official order to retreat through the mountains of Montenegro and Albania and join the Allies to continue the war out of the country. The Serbian High Command concluded that its army was not in a favourable position and condition for a counterattack, but more importantly, that capitulation was a worse choice. The last rearguard action occurred at Prizren on 27 November; subsequently, the defenders withdrew down the Drin River Valley and over the Albanian frontier. Mackensen elected not to follow.

== Aftermath ==
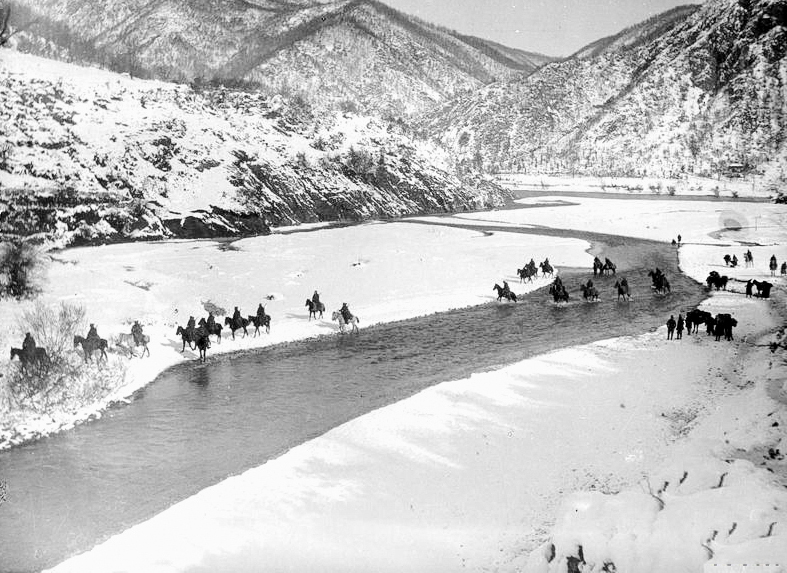
Serbian cavalry heading towards the mountains during the Great Retreat

Following this battle and into early 1916, over 400,000 defeated and worn-out Serbian soldiers and civilian refugees, with thousands of Austrian prisoners, retreated toward the Adriatic coast on a terrible trek across Prokletije, the Accursed Mountains, that separate Serbia and Albania, as the snow began to fall. They retreated in three columns, one across southern Montenegro, one through southern Serbia across northern Albania, and the southernmost from Prizren to the port of Dürres. Facing disease, harsh winter, lack of food and transportation, and harassment from Albanian guerrillas, the survivors managed to reach the Albanian coast in what became known as the "Great Retreat."

The territory of Serbia was occupied by Austro-Hungarian and Bulgarian troops and placed under military occupation for the remainder of the war. In the Austrian zone of occupation (northern and central Serbia), a governor-general was established with a center in Belgrade. In the Bulgarian zone of occupation, a governor-general was established with a center in Niš. Kosovo was divided between the Austrians and the Bulgarians – the Bulgarian army occupied the eastern regions, while the Austro-Hungarian occupied the western regions.

According to British military historian Peter Hart, the Central Powers had captured Serbia, but the Serbian army would fight on regardless. It was a potent example of the difficulties of fighting a war against nation-states that won't accept defeat. Although the three attempts to envelop and destroy the Serbian armies had failed, the strategic objective had been obtained as Germany, Austria-Hungary, Bulgaria, and Turkey then controlled a solid swath of territory in the middle of the Eurasian landmass.

== Sources ==
- Buttar, Prit (2015). Germany Ascendant: The Eastern Front 1915. Bloomsbury Publishing. ISBN 978-1-4728-1355-8.
- DiNardo, Richard L. (14 April 2015). Invasion: The Conquest of Serbia, 1915. ABC-CLIO. ISBN 978-1-4408-0093-1.
- Glenny, Misha (5 September 2012). The Balkans: Nationalism, War, and the Great Powers, 1804-2012: New and Updated. House of Anansi Press Incorporated. ISBN 978-1-77089-274-3.
- Hall, Richard C. (2010). Balkan Breakthrough: The Battle of Dobro Pole 1918. Indiana University Press. ISBN 978-0-253-00411-6.
- Hall, Richard C. (2014). War in the Balkans: An Encyclopedic History from the Fall of the Ottoman Empire to the Breakup of Yugoslavia. ABC-CLIO. ISBN 978-1-61069-031-7.
- Hart, Peter (2013). The Great War: A Combat History of the First World War. Oxford University Press. ISBN 978-0-19-997627-0.
- Sanders, Marble (2016). King of Battle: Artillery in World War I. BRILL. ISBN 978-90-04-30728-5.
- Mitrović, Andrej (2007). Serbia's Great War, 1914-1918. Purdue University Press. ISBN 978-1-55753-476-7.
- Root, G. Irving (April 2010). Balkan Battles: A History of the Balkan Fronts of the First World War. America Star Books. ISBN 978-1-4489-5575-6.
- "Българската армия в Световната война, vol. V (1946)" [The Bulgarian Army in the World War, vol. V] (PDF) (in Bulgarian). 1946.
