= Nikola Zhekov =

Bulgarian general

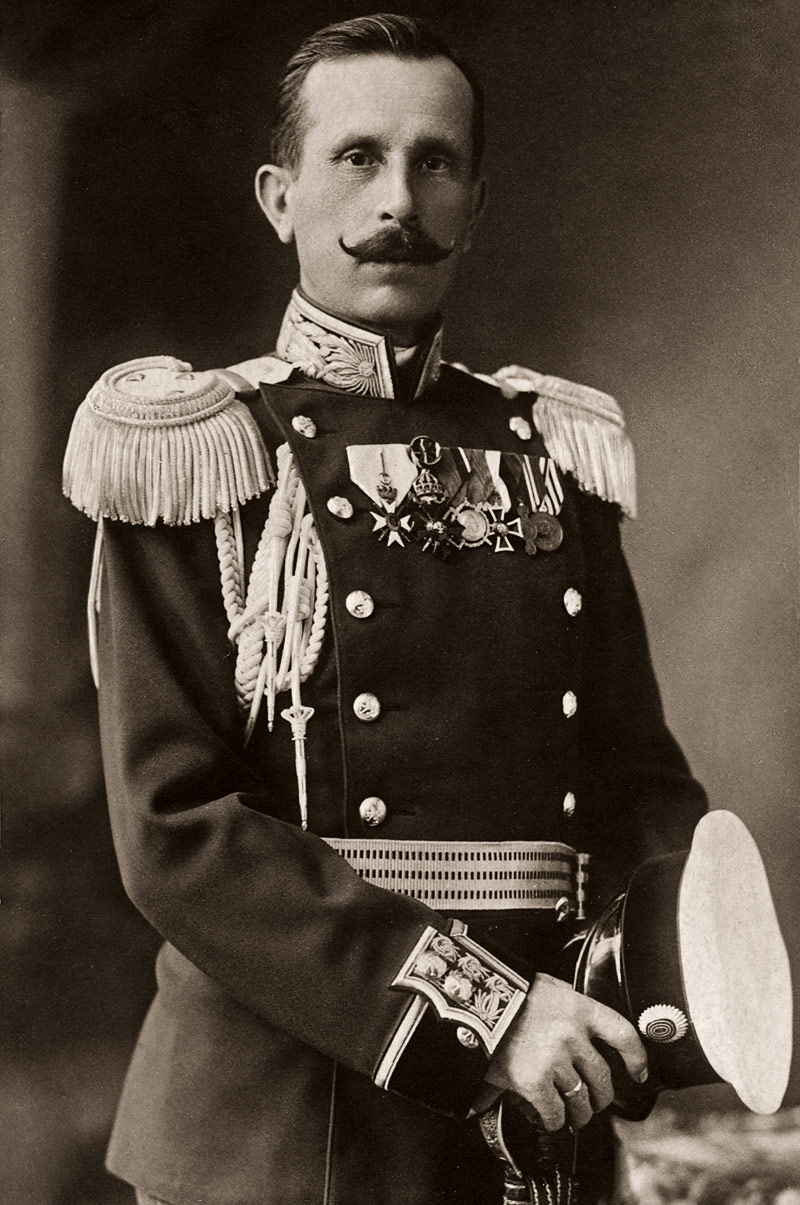
- Born: 6 January 1865; İslimiye, Ottoman Empire (today Sliven, Bulgaria)
- Died: 1 November 1949 (aged 84); Füssen, West Germany
- Military career
- Allegiance: Tsardom of Bulgaria
- Branch: Bulgarian Land Forces
- Service years: 1885–1918
- Rank: General
- Commands: Chief of Staff of the 2nd Army; Commander-in-chief of the Bulgarian Army
- Conflicts: Serbo-Bulgarian War; Balkan Wars; World War I
- Awards

Nikola Todorov Zhekov (Bulgarian: Никола Тодоров Жеков; German: Nikola Todorow Schekow; 6 January 1865 – 1 November 1949) was the Minister of War of Bulgaria in 1915 and served as commander-in-chief from 1915 to 1918 during World War I.

== Biography ==
Nikola Zhekov was born 1865 in Sliven. He was accepted in Sofia Military School and volunteered to serve in a reserve regiment during the Serbo-Bulgarian War of 1885. He took part in the 1886 coup d'état against prince Alexander Batenberg. After the plot failed he was demoted to the rank of cadet and sent to serve in the 12th infantry regiment. Soon after he received an amnesty for his offence and graduated from the Military School.

In 1887 he was promoted to Lieutenant and assigned to the 2nd artillery regiment in Shumen. In 1894 he was promoted to captain and sent to Italy where in 1898 he graduated the military academy of Turin. After his return to Bulgaria he served in the 3rd artillery regiment and in the Army's staff. In 1901 he was promoted to major and taught at the Sofia military school, becoming its headmaster in 1912. Between 1910 and 1912 he also served as commander of the 1st infantry regiment.

=== Balkan Wars ===
During the First Balkan War, Colonel Zhekov served as chief of staff of the 2nd Army which was tasked with the initial siege and latter the storming of the fortress of Edirne. He contracted an illness which prevented him from taking part in the Second Balkan War and after it was assigned commander of the Bulgarian forces in Western Thrace.

In 1913-1914 Zhekov was also part of a Bulgarian diplomatic mission to Istanbul, which was involved in negotiating a military convention between Bulgaria and the Ottoman Empire. After that he served as Deputy Chief of Staff of the Bulgarian Army and commander of the 8th "Tundzha" division. In August 1915 he was promoted to major general and appointed Minister of War.

=== World War I ===
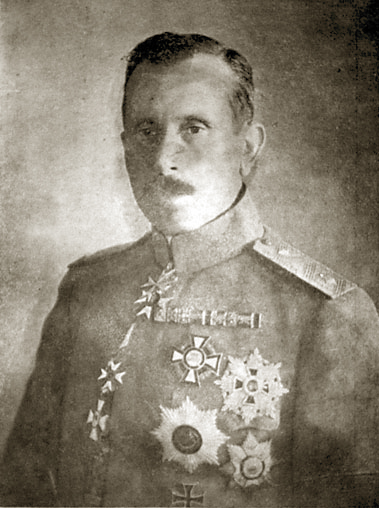
Lt. Gen. Zhekov as commander-in-chief

He became Commander-in-Chief of the Bulgarian Army on 24 September 1915. Zhekov was a proponent for the military intervention of Bulgaria in the war on the side of the Central Powers and led the Bulgarian Army until the end of the war.

Attached to Mackensen's Army Group, the Bulgarian First Army liaised with the Germany and Austria-Hungary in crushing the Royal Serbian Army at home while the Bulgarian Second Army, which remained under direct Bulgarian control, seized Macedonia and defeated the Allied relief effort. Under Mackensen's command, the Bulgarian Army also participated in the militarily highly successful Romanian campaign.

Separately, Zhekov managed in throwing back the Allied offensives on the Salonika front in the autumn of 1916 and the spring of 1917 at the battles of Florina and Lake Prespa. Zhekov's forces also participated in the successful attack against the port of Kavalla in August–September 1916. On 6 October 1916 he was promoted to lieutenant general. In the summer of 1918 he became ill and on 8 September was forced to go to Vienna for medical treatment, leaving the command of the army to the deputy commander-in-chief general Georgi Todorov. It was during this critical time when the Allied Vardar offensive in Macedonia managed to break the Bulgarian lines at Dobro Pole and lead to the Armistice of Salonica. On 4 November 1918 Zhekov was discharged from the active army and went into the reserve.

=== Later life ===
After the war Zhekov chose to flee into exile in Germany. He returned in 1921 to defend his reputation and was sentenced to ten years imprisonment by Stamboliyski's BANU government but was granted pardon after the 1923 coup d'état and was released in 1924.

In the years after that Zhekov read lectures in the Military Academy and wrote several books regarding the military science and his memoirs. On 6 May 1936 he was promoted to general of the infantry, which was the highest rank in the Bulgarian Army.

Zhekov was one of the prominent figures of Bulgarian interwar nationalism. Thus he was an honorary leader of the Union of Bulgarian National Legions at one point.

During World War II General Zhekov established a friendly relationship with Adolf Hitler and following the defeat of France in 1940 he was invited by the Führer to visit Paris as his guest. After the communist 1944 coup d'état General Zhekov, fearing political persecutions, decided to emigrate to Germany. On 1 February 1945 he was sentenced in absentia to death by the People's Court established by the government of the Fatherland Front. However, his whereabouts were unknown to the government and the sentence could not be carried out.

Zhekov died on 1 November 1949 in the Bavarian town of Füssen. After the fall of communism in Bulgaria, on 7 November 1992 his remains were returned to country and were laid to rest in the Military Mausoleum in Sofia. A street in Sofia is named after him.

== Awards ==
- Order of Bravery, II grade and III grade,2 class
- Order of St Alexander, I grade with swords and Great Cross of the Order without swords
- Order of Military Merit, IV and V grade
- German Pour le Mérite,
- German Iron Cross, I and II class
- German Order of the Red Eagle, Grand Cross and 2nd Class
- German Saxe-Ernestine House Order,
- German Order of the Württemberg Crown,
- Austro-Hungarian Order of the Iron Crown, II class
- Austro-Hungarian Order of Leopold, I class
- Austro-Hungarian Military Merit Cross, I class with War Decoration
- Ottoman Order of Osmanieh, I class
- Ottoman War Medal ("Iron Crescent"),
- Ottoman Imtiyaz Medal in gold and in silver

== See also ==
- Balkans Campaign (World War I)

Political offices
Preceded by Ivan Fichev	Minister of War of Bulgaria; 19 August 1915 – 4 October 1915	Succeeded by Kalin Naydenov
