= Second Army (Serbia) =

Serbian Second Army Српска Друга Армија
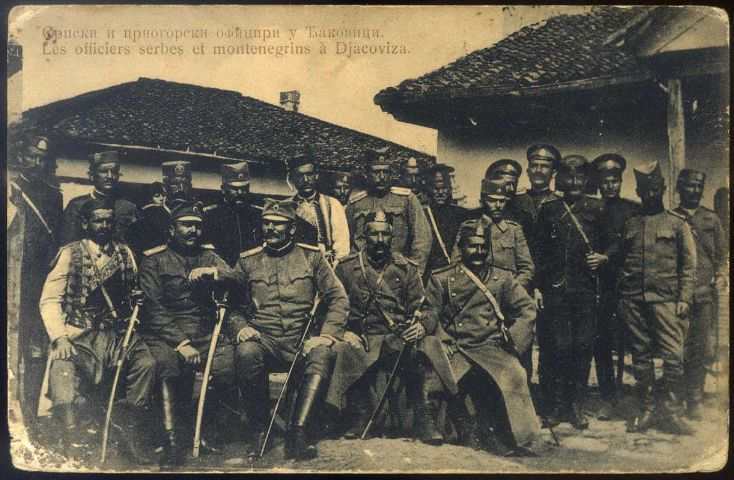
- Serbian officers in Gjakovica, 1913
- Active: 1912–1919
- Country: Kingdom of Serbia
- Type: Field Army
- Role: Conventional warfare
- Size: 74,000 in 1912; 4 divisions
- Engagements: First Balkan War; Second Balkan War; World War I

Commanders
- Commander: Gen. Stepa Stepanović

The Serbian Second Army (Serbian: Српска Друга Армија / Srpska Druga Armija) was a Serbian field army that fought during the Balkan Wars and World War I.

During the First Balkan War, the Second Army participated in the Battle of Kumanovo (23 - October 24, 1912) along with the Serbian First Army and the Serbian Third Army and was deployed in the area around Kyustendil. It was assigned to the easternmost attack, with the objective of attacking the right flank of the Ottoman Army. The Second Army was led by Stepa Stepanović made up of one Serbian and one Bulgarian divisions.

In World War I, the second Army fought in the successful Battles of Cer, Drina and Kolubra in 1914. But in Autumn 1915 they were defeated by the Bulgarians and Germans during the Morava and Kosovo Offensives.

The second Army was reestablished at the Macedonian front in 1916 and, after almost 3 years of fighting, was able to take part in the liberation of Serbia in October 1918.

Stepa Stepanović remained commander of the Second Army until 1919.

== Order of battle ==
=== August 1914 ===
- Second Army
  - I Šumadija Infantry Division - Lazarevac
  - I Danub Infantry Division - Belgrade
  - I Mixed Division - village Darosava
  - I Morava Infantry Division - Aranđelovac
