= Morava Offensive =

Operation of the Bulgarian Army

- Part of the Serbian campaign (1915)
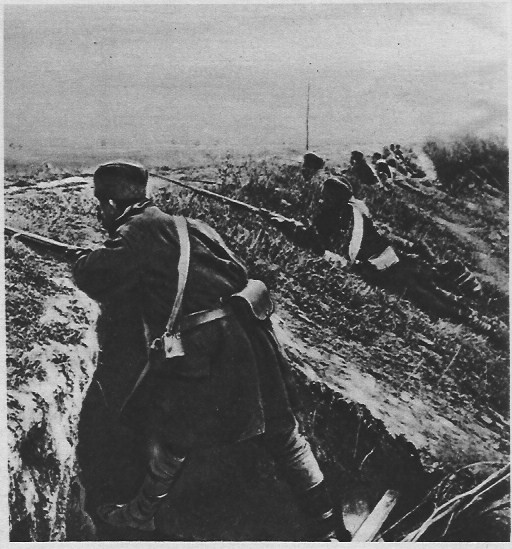
- Serbian reservists near Morava river (Autumn 1915)
Date	14 October 1915 – 9 November 1915
Location	front from Leskovac to Negotin, Serbia
Result	Bulgarian victory

Belligerents
Bulgaria	Serbia

Commanders and leaders
(Tsardom of Bulgaria (1908–1946)) Kliment Boyadzhiev	(Kingdom of Serbia) Stepa Stepanovic

Strength
First Army: 195,620 men; 116,569 rifleman; 108 machine guns; 422 cannons	Second Army – 5 infantry divisions: 90,000 riflemen; 94 machine guns; 248 cannons

Casualties and losses
1,906 killed; 10,637 wounded; 925 missing	6,000 casualties

The Morava Offensive Operation (Bulgarian: Моравска настъпателна операция), (Serbian: Битка на Морави) was undertaken by the Bulgarian First Army between 14 October 1915 and 9 November 1915, as part of the strategic offensive operation of Army Group Mackensen against Serbia in 1915. Under the command of Lieutenant General Kliment Boyadzhiev, the Bulgarians seized the fortified areas of Pirot, Niš and the valley of the river Morava. As a result, the Serbian forces were compelled to retreat towards Kosovo and Metohija.

Due to the harsh weather, the defenders' strong resistance and the rough terrain, early Bulgarian advance was slow. But because the defenders were severely outnumbered, the Bulgarians broke through near Pirot in 10 days, and the Serbs retreated to the Timok.

The battle continued for 27 days, and the Bulgarians penetrated up to 90 km deep into Serbia's territory. The Serbs lost 6,000 men, 60 guns, and a large amount of military equipment.

== Sources ==
- DiNardo, Richard L. (2015). Invasion: The Conquest of Serbia, 1915. Santa Barbara: Praeger. ISBN 9781440800924.
- Атанас Пейчев и колектив, 1300 години на стража, Военно издателство, София 1984.
