= Vladimir Stoychev =

Bulgarian Army officer (1892–1990)

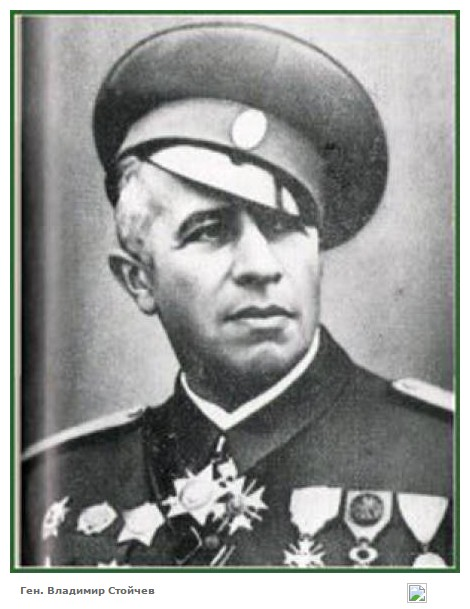
- Born: March 24, 1892; Sofia, Principality of Bulgaria
- Died: April 27, 1990 (aged 98); Sofia, Bulgaria
- Military career
- Rank: Colonel general
- Conflicts: First Balkan War; Bulgarian front; Second Balkan War; World War I; World War II; Operation Frühlingserwachen; Nagykanizsa–Körmend offensive; Vienna offensive

Vladimir Dimitrov Stoychev (Bulgarian: Владимир Димитров Стойчев, 24 March 1892 – 27 April 1990) was a Bulgarian Colonel General, diplomat, and Olympic equestrian.

== Biography ==
Vladimir Stoychev was born in Sofia, the capital of the Principality of Bulgaria. He graduated from the Theresian Military Academy in Vienna, and the Military School and the Military Academy in Sofia. As a serviceman in the Bulgarian Army, Stoychev participated in the Balkan Wars and World War I.

In the interwar period, Stoychev represented Bulgaria in the equestrian events at the 1924 Summer Olympics in Paris and the 1928 Summer Olympics in Amsterdam, among other competitions. From 1930 to 1934, Stoychev was a Bulgarian attaché in France and the United Kingdom. In 1934, he was appointed head of the Sofia Cavalry Academy, but he was fired from the army a year later due to his antimonarchist views and his affiliation with the Zveno movement. In the following years, he was also imprisoned a number of times due to his political stance.

In 1944, Stoychev became a member of the Fatherland Front's Bureau of the National Committee. During World War II, Stoychev was in command of the Bulgarian First Army after the country switched allegiance to the Allies. Under Stoychev, the Bulgarian First Army helped the Red Army and Yugoslav Partisans drawing the Nazis out of much of Yugoslavia and Hungary, reaching the Austrian Alps by May 1945. On 8 May 1945, Vladimir Stoychev signed a demarcation agreement with British V Corps commander Charles Keightley in southern Austria. On 24 June 1945, he took part in the Moscow Victory Parade.

In 1945–1947, Vladimir Stoychev was Bulgaria's representative in Washington, D.C., and the United Nations. Upon his return, he became Chairman of the Supreme Committee of Sports with the Council of Ministers. From 1951 or 1952 to 1982, he presided over the Bulgarian Olympic Committee; he remained honorary chairman until his death. From 1952 to 1987, he was also an International Olympic Committee member. Vladimir Stoychev died in Sofia in 1990, at the age of 98.
