= Kuno von Steuben =

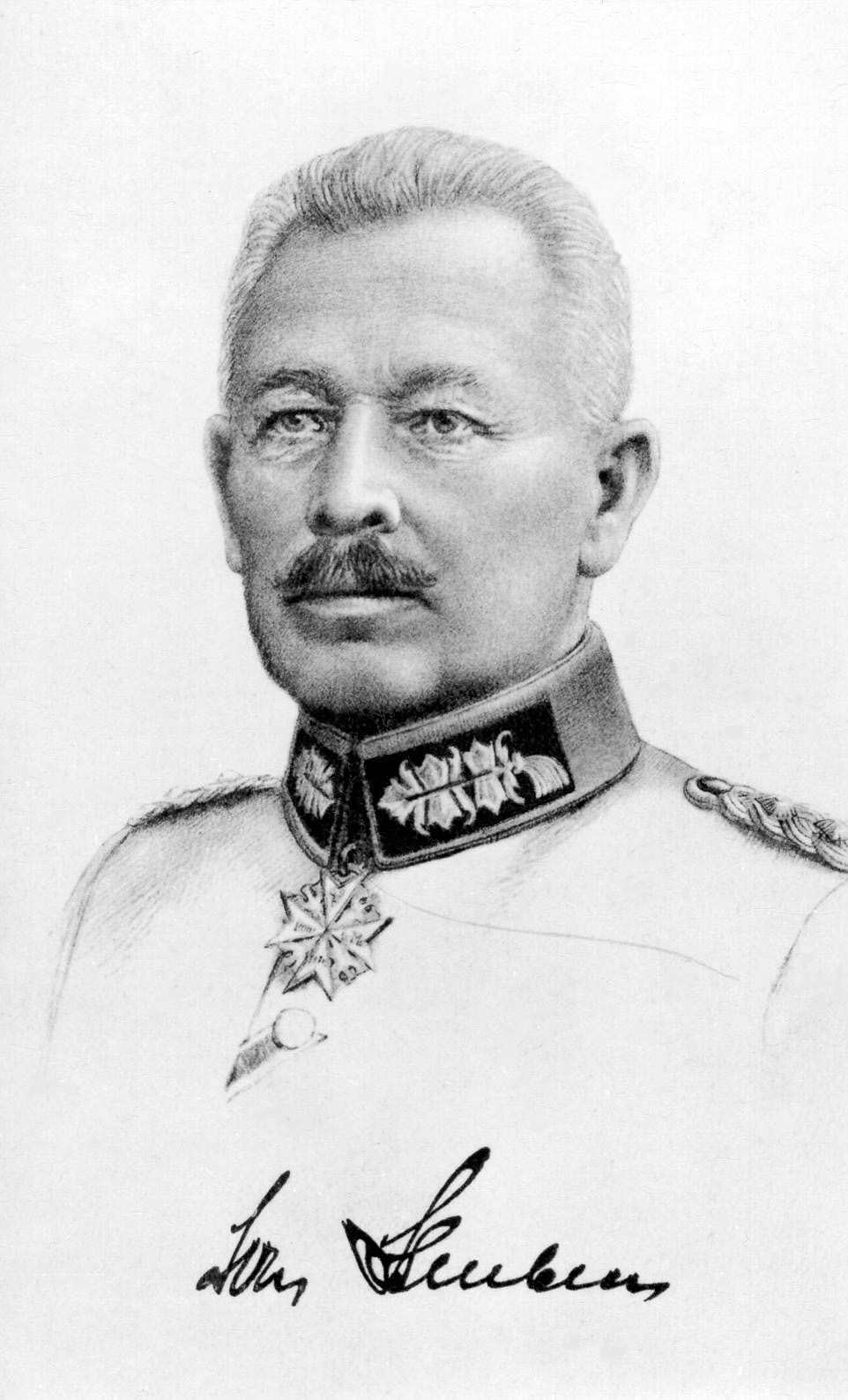

Kuno Arndt von Steuben (Eisenach, 9 April 1855 – Berlin, 14 January 1935) was a Prussian military officer, and a general in the First World War.

== Life ==
He was born in a noble family, of which Friedrich Wilhelm von Steuben (1730–1794) is best known. He joined the Prussian Army at the age of 13. By 1911 he commanded the 36th Division as lieutenant general. In 1913 he was director of the Prussian Military Academy. Moltke had asked Kaiser for his promotion to General der Infanterie. Steuben was promoted on 19 August 1914, shortly after the beginning of World War I.

At the outbreak of the war, he received command of the XVIII Reserve Corps. His corps was part of 4th Army, commanded by Albrecht, Duke of Württemberg, on the march to the Marne river. It saw action in the Battle of the Ardennes, the Second Battle of Champagne and the Battle of Verdun. For his services in the Second Battle of Champagne, Steuben was awarded with the prestigious Pour le Mérite.

On 5 June 1917, he was sent to the Salonika front to lead the 11th German Army. Together with his Bulgarian allies, he held the frontline until 15 September 1918, when the allies gained a crushing victory in the Battle of Dobro Pole and Bulgaria was forced to conclude an armistice. Von Steuben and his 11th Army had to withdraw behind the Danube into Hungary.

After the German capitulation, they returned home on 8 December 1918. Von Steuben retired from the Army on 31 January 1919. He died in 1935 and was buried in the Invalidenfriedhof.

Military offices
| Preceded by General der Infanterie Arnold von Winckler | Commander, 11th Army; 5 June 1917 – December 1918 | Succeeded by Dissolved |
