= Doiran Lake =

Lake shared between North Macedonia and Greece

Dojran Lake Дојранско Езеро Λίμνη Δοϊράνη
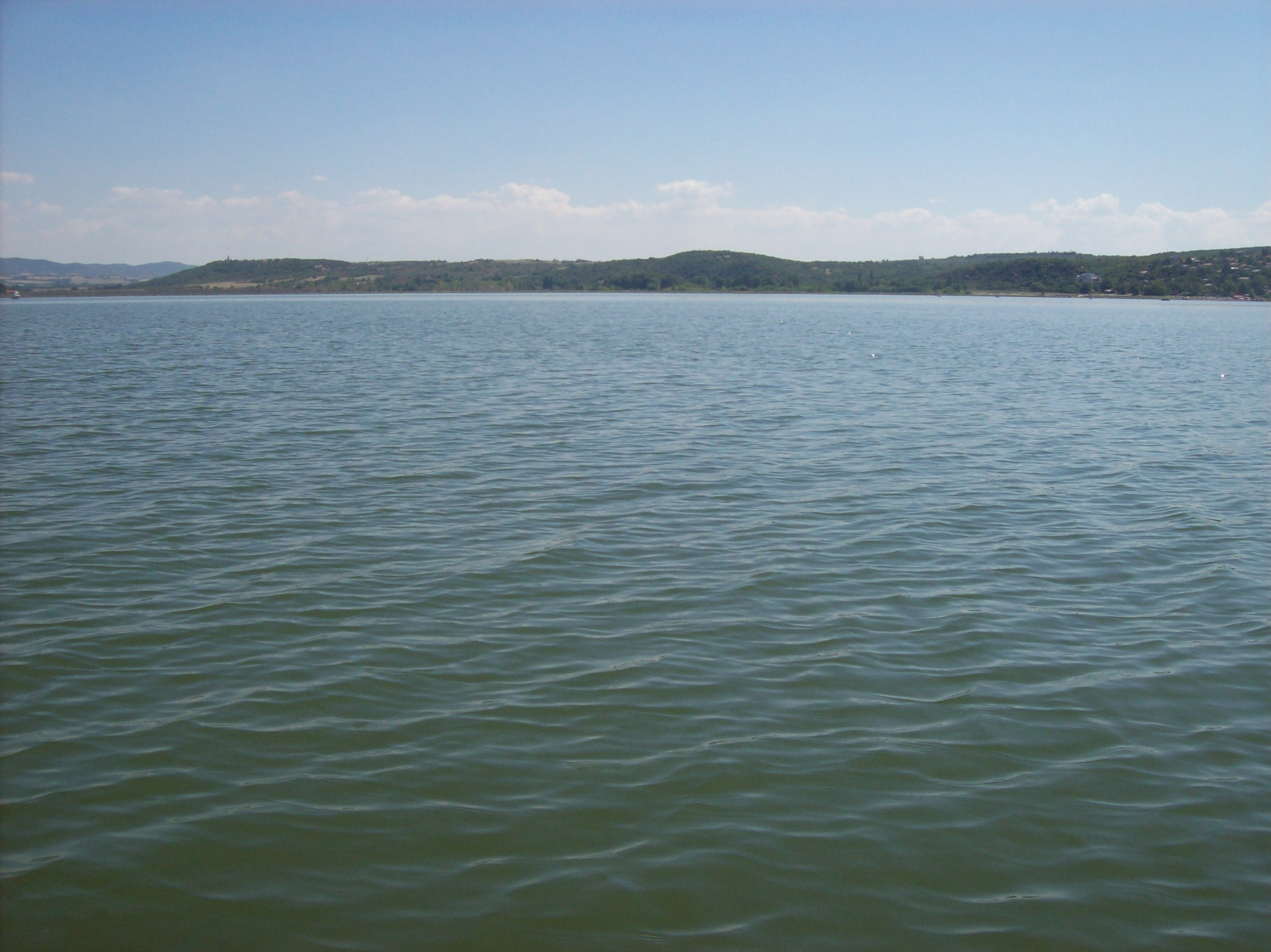

- Location within North Macedonia Location within Greece
- Interactive map of Dojran Lake; Дојранско Езеро; Λίμνη Δοϊράνη
- Location: Region of Macedonia
- Coordinates: 41°13′N 22°45′E
- Basin countries: Greece, North Macedonia
- Max. length: 8.9 km (5.5 mi)
- Max. width: 7.1 km (4.4 mi)
- Surface area: 43.1 km^{2} (16.6 sq mi)
- Max. depth: 10 m (33 ft)
- Surface elevation: 148 m (486 ft)

Ramsar Wetland
- Official name: Dojran Lake
- Designated: 2 August 2007
- Reference no.: 1735

Doiran Lake (Macedonian: Дојранско Езеро, Dojransko Ezero; Greek: Λίμνη Δοϊράνη, Límni Dhoïráni), also spelled Dojran Lake is a lake with an area of 43.1 km^{2} (16.6 sq mi) shared between North Macedonia (27.3 km^{2}, 10.5 sq mi) and Greece (15.8 km^{2}, 6.1 sq mi). It is drained by the Doirani River, a tributary of the Vardar.

To the west is the city of Nov Dojran (Нов Дојран), to the east the village of Mouries, to the north the mountain Belasica/Beles and to the south the Greek town of Doirani. The lake has a rounded shape, a maximum depth of 10 m (33 ft) and a north-to-south length of 8.9 km (5.5 mi) and is 7.1 km (4.4 mi) at its widest, making it the third largest lake partially in North Macedonia after Lake Ohrid and Lake Prespa.

== History ==
The lake was on the southern line of the Macedonian front during World War I, and its southern shore became the site of the various battles between allied troops and Bulgarian troops in 1916, 1917 and 1918. A monument to one of the battles and two cemeteries for Greek and British troops stand on a hill a few hundred metres south of the lake. It was designed by Sir Robert Lorimer.

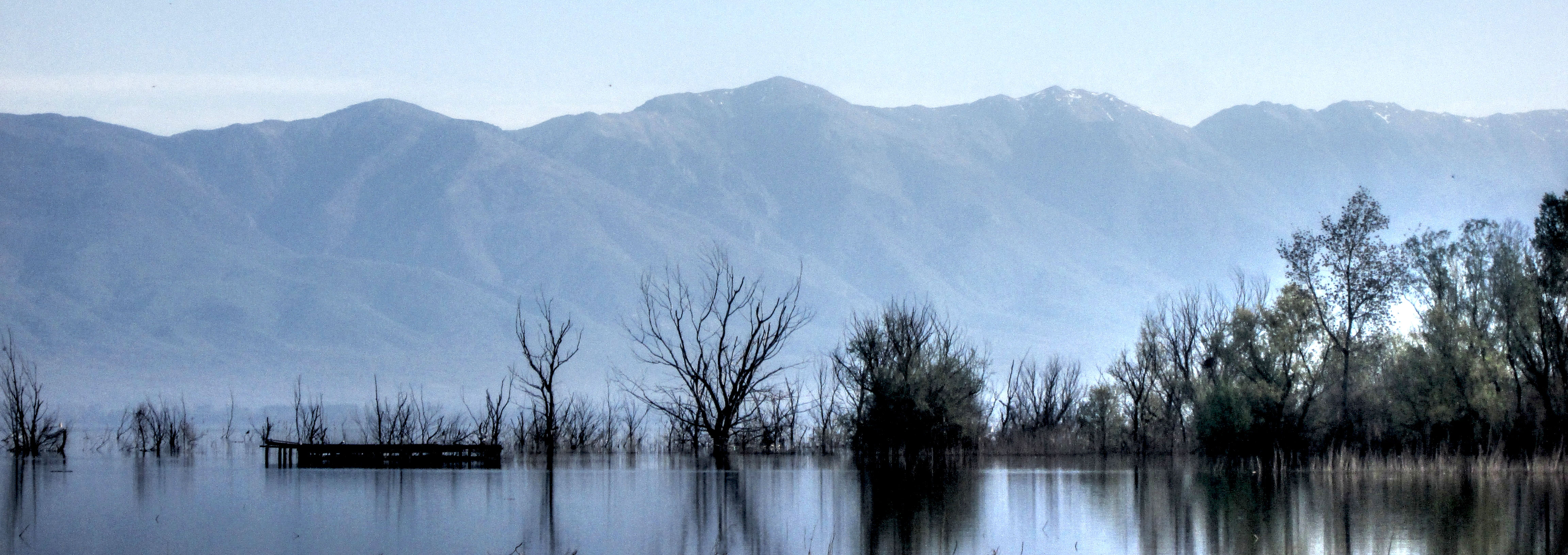
Landscape

== Ecology ==
The lake is shallow and eutrophic, with extensive Phragmites reedbeds. Due to the overuse of the lake's water for agricultural purposes, Doiran's water nearly drained out, but the disaster was avoided after both countries took measures to replenish and sustain water levels. Frequent and heavy rainfall in later years helped restore water levels in the lake.

=== Important Bird Areas ===
North Macedonia's part of the lake has been designated an Important Bird Area (IBA) by BirdLife International because it supports populations of ferruginous ducks, Dalmatian pelicans and pygmy cormorants. Greece's part of the lake is a separate but corresponding IBA.
