= Kliment Boyadzhiev =

Bulgarian general

- Климент Бояджиев
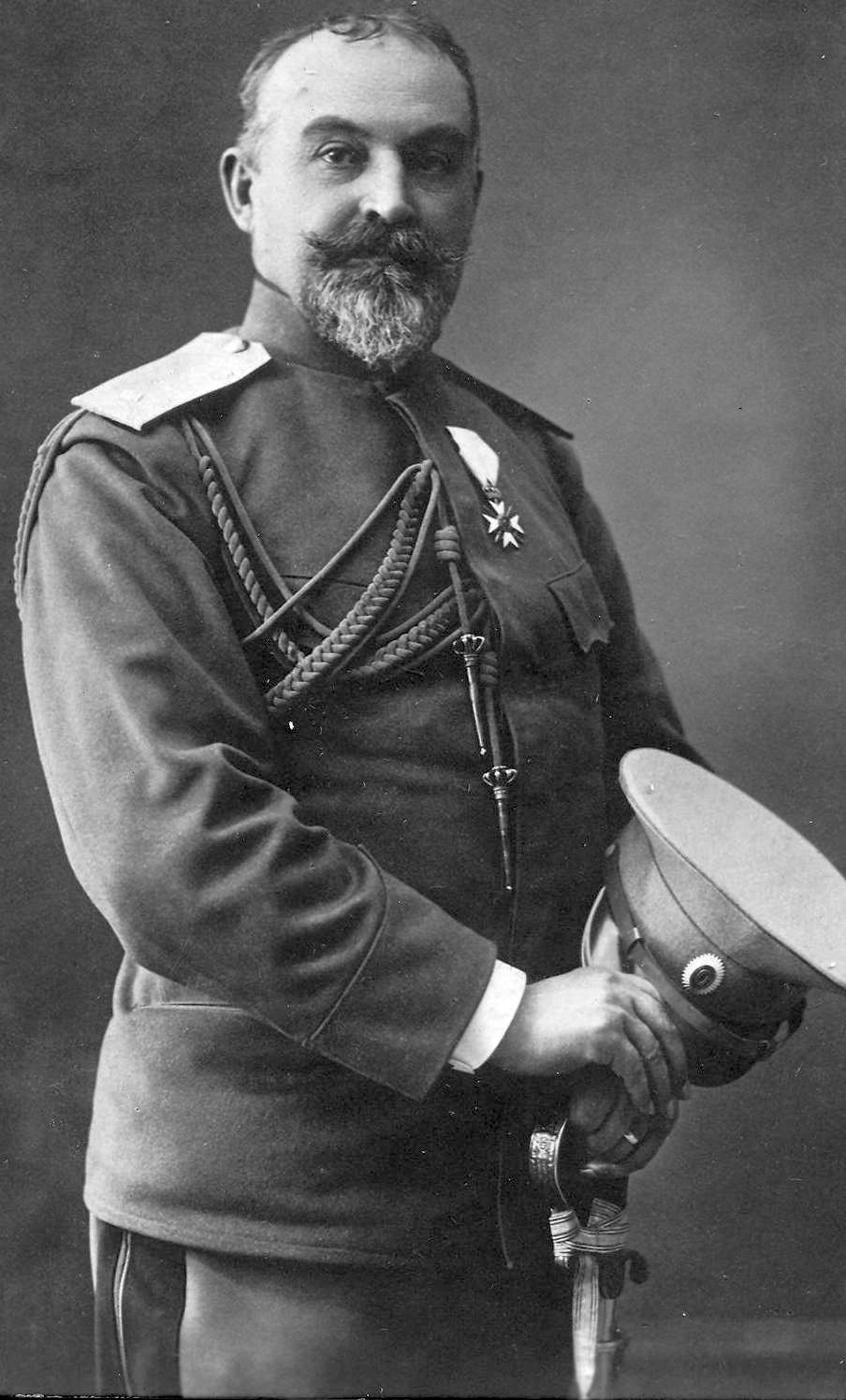
- General Kliment Boyadzhiev

Minister of War of the Kingdom of Bulgaria
- In office 4 September 1913 – 14 September 1914
- Monarch: Ferdinand I
- Prime Minister: Vasil Radoslavov
- Preceded by: Georgi Vazov
- Succeeded by: Ivan Fichev

Chief of the General Staff of the Bulgarian Army
- In office 28 April 1915 – 20 September 1915
- Monarch: Ferdinand I
- Preceded by: Pravoslav Tenev
- Succeeded by: Konstantin Zhostov

Personal details
- Born: 15 April 1861 Ohrid, Ottoman Empire
- Died: 15 July 1933 (aged 72) Sofia, Bulgaria

Military service
- Allegiance: Principality of Bulgaria (1881–1908); Kingdom of Bulgaria (1908–1916)
- Branch/service: Bulgarian Army
- Years of service: 1881–1916
- Rank: Lieutenant General
- Commands: 4th Preslav Infantry Division (1910–1913); Chief of the General Staff (1915); 1st Army (1915–1916)
- Battles/wars: Serbo-Bulgarian War; First Balkan War; Bulgarian front; Battle of Kirk Kilisse; Battle of Lule Burgas; First Battle of Çatalca; Second Battle of Çatalca; Second Balkan War; World War I; Serbian campaign (1915); Morava Offensive; Battle of Niš (1915); Kosovo offensive (1915); Salonika front; Battle of Kaymakchalan
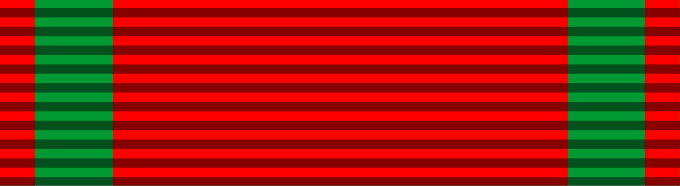
- Awards

Kliment Evtimov Boyadzhiev (Bulgarian: Климент Евтимов Бояджиев) (15 April 1861 – 15 July 1933) was a Bulgarian general and statesman. Born in Ohrid in the Ottoman Empire, he moved to Bulgaria after the Liberation and graduated from the Military School in Sofia in 1883 and the General Staff Academy in Turin in 1893. He took part in the Serbo-Bulgarian War, the Balkan Wars and the First World War, and briefly served as Minister of War. He commanded the 4th Preslav Infantry Division during the First Balkan War and later the First Army during the 1915 campaign against Serbia. Boyadzhiev was also interested in cartography and produced a relief map of Bulgaria in 1902. After leaving active service, he spent several years in Germany before returning to Bulgaria, where he died in Sofia in 1933.

== Biography ==
Born in Ohrid, he studied in an elementary school there. After the liberation of Bulgaria in 1878, he emigrated to Sofia. In 1883, he graduated from the Military School in Sofia and in 1895 graduated from the Military Academy in Turin, Italy.

During the successful Serbo-Bulgarian War in 1885, he was an aide-de-camp in the Western Corps quarters. He distinguished himself in the Battle of Lule Burgas during the First Balkan War as a commander of the Fourth Preslav Infantry Division. Between 22 August 1913 and 1 September 1913, Kliment Boyadzhiev was the Minister of War.

During World War I, he commanded the 1st Army which achieved major successes against the Royal Serbian Army in the offiensives of Morava and Kosovo. Boyadzhiev remained in that position until 25 September 1916, when he was replaced by Dimitar Geshov and went to the reserve. The general was awarded four Bulgarian medals for courage and bravery, as well as one Russian. After the war, between 1918 and 1923 he emigrated to Germany.

He was also an author of a relief map of Bulgaria in 1902.

Boyadzhiev died in Sofia in 1933.

== Honours ==
- Order of Bravery
- Order of St Alexander
- Order of Military Merit
- Order of Stara Planina, 1st grade with swords - awarded posthumously on 20 December 2012
- Ottoman Liakat Medal
- Boyadzhiev Point in Antarctica is named after Kliment Boyadzhiev.

== Sources ==
- Ташев, Ташо (1999). "Министрите на България 1879-1999". София: АИ „Проф. Марин Дринов" / Изд. на МО.

Political offices
Preceded by Georgi Vazov	Minister of War of Bulgaria; 4 September 1913 – 14 September 1914	Succeeded by Ivan Fichev
Military offices
Preceded by Pravoslav Tenev	Chief of the General Staff; 15 April 1915 – 7 September 1915	Succeeded by Konstantin Zhostov
