= Arnold von Winckler =

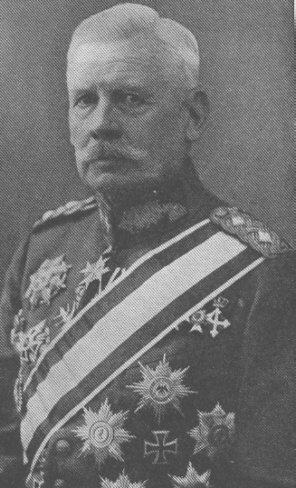
- Born: 17 February 1856; Neisse, Silesia, Prussia (now Nysa, Poland)
- Died: 24 July 1945 (aged 89); Bad Freienwalde
- Occupation: Prussian World War I general

Arnold von Winckler (Neisse, 17 February 1856 – Bad Freienwalde, 24 July 1945) was a Prussian military officer, and a general in World War I.

He was the son of Lieutenant General Ewald Fedor von Winckler (1813–1895) and joined the Prussian army at the age of 17. By 1912 he commanded the 2nd Guards Infantry Division in Berlin.

At the outbreak of World War I, he fought with his division on the Western Front as part of the Second Army and participated in the First Battle of the Marne. In early 1915, his division was moved to the Eastern Front, where it fought in the Gorlice–Tarnów Offensive.

On 29 June, he received the command over the XXXXI Reserve Corps and in September over the IV Reserve Corps to participate in the Invasion of Serbia.
In March 1916, he took over the command of the 11th German Army from Max von Gallwitz on the Salonika front. Together with his Bulgarian allies, he held the frontline until he was relieved of command in June 1917. He was sent to command the I Corps.

Winckler led the successful counteroffensive to the Russian Kerensky Offensive.

After the armistice with Russia in February 1918, he received the command of the XXV Reserve Corps on the Western Front, where he fought until November 1918. Von Winckler retired from the Army in January 1919.

He died in 1945 in Bad Freienwalde.

Military offices
Preceded by General der Artillerie Max von Gallwitz	Commander, 11th Army; 16 April 1916 – 5 June 1917	Succeeded by General der Infanterie Kuno von Steuben
