= Battle of Doiran (1916) =

WWI battle on the Macedonian front

Coordinates: 41.2000°N 22.7500°E

First Battle of Doiran
- Part of Macedonian front (World War I)
Date	9 August 1916 – 18 August 1916
Location	Doiran Lake, Bulgarian-occupied Kingdom of Serbia (present-day North Macedonia)
Result	Bulgarian victory

Belligerents
Bulgaria	France; United Kingdom

Commanders and leaders
(Tsardom of Bulgaria (1908–1946)) Dimitar Geshov	(French Third Republic) Maurice Sarrail

Strength
2nd Thracian Infantry Division	(French Third Republic) 3 divisions; (United Kingdom of Great Britain and Ireland) 1 division; 45,000 men; 400 guns

Casualties and losses
851	3,200 men

At the beginning of August 1916, three French and one British division with 45,000 men and 400 guns launched an offensive against the Bulgarian positions at Doiran Lake, defended by the 2nd Thracian Infantry Division. The attack began on 9 August with heavy artillery fire on the positions of the 27th Chepino Regiment and 9th Plovdiv Regiment. All four attacks that followed on 10, 15, 16 and 18 August were repulsed by the Second Division, and the Allies were forced to retreat to their original positions with heavy casualties.

Other sources state that the French took Tortoise Hill (Tortue) and Doldzeli, an area of 30 km^{2}, but at a very high cost. The British 7th Battalion of the Oxfordshire & Buckinghamshire Light Infantry took Horseshoe Hill.
