= Dimitar Geshov =

Bulgarian Officer

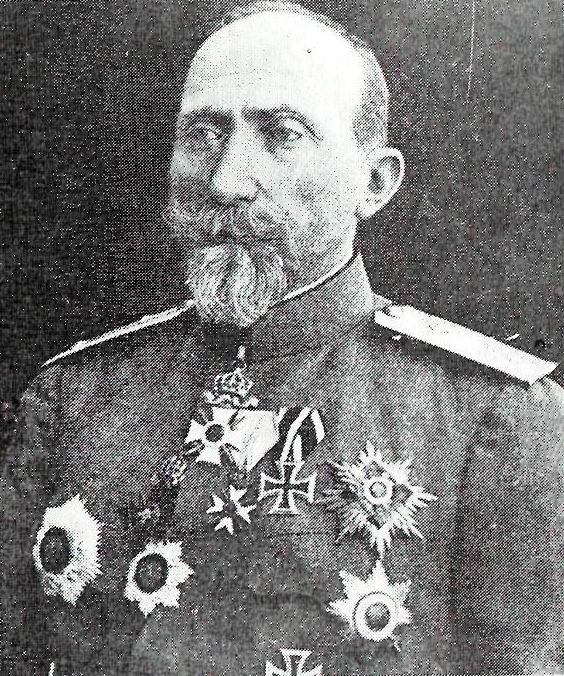
- Born: 14 September 1860; Ziştovi, Ottoman Empire (today Svishtov, Bulgaria)
- Died: January 8, 1922 (aged 61); Sofia, Bulgaria
- Military career
- Allegiance: Tsardom of Bulgaria
- Branch: Bulgarian Army
- Service years: 1888–1919
- Rank: General of the Infantry
- Commands: 2nd Thracian Infantry Division; 1st Bulgarian Army
- Conflicts: Russo-Turkish War (1877–1878); Serbo-Bulgarian War; Balkan Wars; First World War

Geshov Dimitar Ivanov (Bulgarian: Димитър Иванов Гешов) (Svishtov, September 14, 1860 – Sofia, January 8, 1922) was a Bulgarian officer. During the First World War, he commanded in 1916–1918 the Bulgarian First Army on the Salonika front.

== Biography ==
Dimitar Geshov was born on September 14, 1860, in Ziştovi (Svishtov), then part of Turkey. He took part in the Russo-Turkish War (1877–1878) as a volunteer. After the liberation, he graduated from the Odessa Military School in 1880.

In the Serbo-Bulgarian War (1885), he was a company commander and participated in the battles at Breznik and Pirot.

During the Balkan Wars (1912–1913), he first commanded the 1st Brigade of the 2nd Thracian Infantry Division, and from December 24, 1912, he became commander of the entire 2nd Thracian Infantry Division. He distinguished himself at Krivolak, on June 22, 1913, and was promoted to major general.

During World War I (1915–1918), he again commanded the 2nd Thracian Infantry Division. On 22 March 1916, he was awarded the Ottoman Medal for Military Merit, on 11 May 1917, the Order of Medjidie, and on 4 October 1917, the Silver Order of Liakat.

In September 1916, he was promoted to commander of the Bulgarian First Army. With his army, he repelled in 1917 several allied attacks, at Monastir, Doiran and the Cerna Bend. But as a consequence of the defeat in the Battle of Skra-di-Legen, General Dimitar Geshov was replaced on July 30, 1918, by General Stefan Nerezov. Geshov became head of the Moravian inspection area.

On July 1, 1919, he was promoted to infantry general and went into the reserve.

Dimitar Geshov died on January 8, 1922, in Sofia.
