= 11th Army (German Empire) =

11. Armee; 11th Army
- Flag of the Staff of an Armee Oberkommando (1871–1918)
- Active: 9 March 1915 – 8 September 1915; 23 September 1915 – 7 January 1919
- Country: German Empire
- Type: Army
- Engagements: World War I Eastern Front Balkans Serbian Campaign Salonika front

Insignia
- Abbreviation: A.O.K. 11

The 11th Army (German: 11. Armee / Armeeoberkommando 11 / A.O.K. 11) was an army level command of the German Army in World War I. It was formed in March 1915 in Kassel originally to serve on the Western Front but was transported to Galicia for service on the Eastern Front. The army was dissolved on 8 September 1915, but reformed on 23 September 1915 for the Serbian Campaign. It was finally dissolved on 7 January 1919.

== History ==
The 11th Army was formed in early 1915. It briefly fought on the Western Front during the Battle of Ypres, holding the line against the Allied attack. On 22 April, it was transferred and placed with the Austrian 4th Army under Mackensen's command, behind the Gorlice–Tarnow gap, south of the Vistula River. In July 1915, the 11th Army advanced into Russian territory in a general German offensive. The 11th Army was dissolved on 8 September 1915.

On 23 September 1915 a new 11th Army was created for the Serbian Campaign under command of Max von Gallwitz. It was composed of the III Corps, the IV Reserve Corps and the X Reserve Corps. After the retreat of Serbian army, the 11th Army remained on the Salonika front in support of the Bulgarian Army. During its time on the front the army gradually became more and more composed of Bulgarian divisions. By the time of the Vardar Offensive in September 1918, The 11th German Army consisted almost fully of Bulgarian soldiers commanded by German officers.

The headquarters of the Army was situated in Veles on 31 January 1916, moved to Prilep on 5 October 1916 until the retreat to Hungary in September 1918.

== Commanders ==
11th Army had the following commanders until absorbed by Heeresgruppe Mackensen on 8 September 1915:

11th Army
From	Commander	Previously	Subsequently,
9 March 1915 until 27 March 1915	General der Infanterie Max von Fabeck	XIII Corps	1st Army
16 April 1915	Generaloberst August von Mackensen	9th Army	Heeresgruppe Mackensen concurrently from 27 April 1915
22 June 1915	Generalfeldmarschall August von Mackensen	9th Army	Heeresgruppe Mackensen concurrently from 27 April 1915

The "new" 11th Army had the following commanders:

"New" 11th Army
From	Commander	Previously	Subsequently,
23 September 1915	General der Artillerie Max von Gallwitz	12th Army	Attack Group West – Verdun
16 April 1916 acting until 23 July 1916	General der Infanterie Arnold von Winckler	IV Reserve Corps concurrently until 24 July 1916	I Corps
5 June 1917	General der Infanterie Kuno von Steuben	XVIII Reserve Corps	Retired status

== Glossary ==
- Armee-Abteilung or Army Detachment in the sense of "something detached from an Army". It is not under the command of an Army so is in itself a small Army.
- Armee-Gruppe or Army Group in the sense of a group within an Army and under its command, generally formed as a temporary measure for a specific task.
- Heeresgruppe or Army Group in the sense of a number of armies under a single commander.

== See also ==
- 11th Army (Wehrmacht) for the equivalent formation in World War II

== Bibliography ==
- Cron, Hermann (2002) [1937]. Imperial German Army 1914–18: Organisation, Structure, Orders-of-Battle. Helion & Co. ISBN 1-874622-70-1.
- DiNardo, Richard L. (2015). Invasion: The Conquest of Serbia, 1915. Santa Barbara: Praeger.
- Ellis, John; Cox, Michael (1993). The World War I Databook. Aurum Press. ISBN 1-85410-766-6.
- Korsun, Nikolay (1939). Балканский фронт мировой войны 1914–1918 гг [Balkan Front of the World War 1914–1918] (in Russian). Moscow: Boenizdat. OCLC 7970969.
