= Mitka Grubcheva =

Bulgarian communist activist and partisan

Mitka Grubcheva political activist and partisan
- Born: Mitka Ognyana; 1916; Radomirtsi, Bulgaria
- Died: 1993 (aged 76–77); Bulgaria

Mitka Grubcheva (née Ognyana, 1916 - 1993) was a Bulgarian political activist, participant in the communist movement during the Second World War and partisan from the "Georgi Benkovski" squadron.

== Biography ==
Mitka Ognyana was born in 1916, in the village of Radomirtsi, Pleven Province. She participated in the communist movement during the Second World War, fighting as part of the groups led by the BCC and as a partisan squadron "Georgi Benkovski".

On September 12, 1944, during the mass chaos after the 1944 coup d'état, Grubcheva personally eliminated the commanding general of the Fourth Bulgarian Army, Atanas Stefanov, in Lukovit. She later claimed that it was in self-defense, but this was denied by other communists present at the scene.

During the period 1944 – 1960, she was employed at the Committee for State Security.

Mitka later married Dimitar Grubchev, who was also a partisan. They later had two children: Ivanka, now a famous producer in Bulgaria, and Sokol, an employee for the Committee for State Security and later the Ministry of Foreign Affairs.

Grubcheva is the author of the memoir "In the name of the people".
