= Tupella Family Tower House =

Cultural heritage monument in Kosovo

- Kulla e Tupellëve (Albanian)
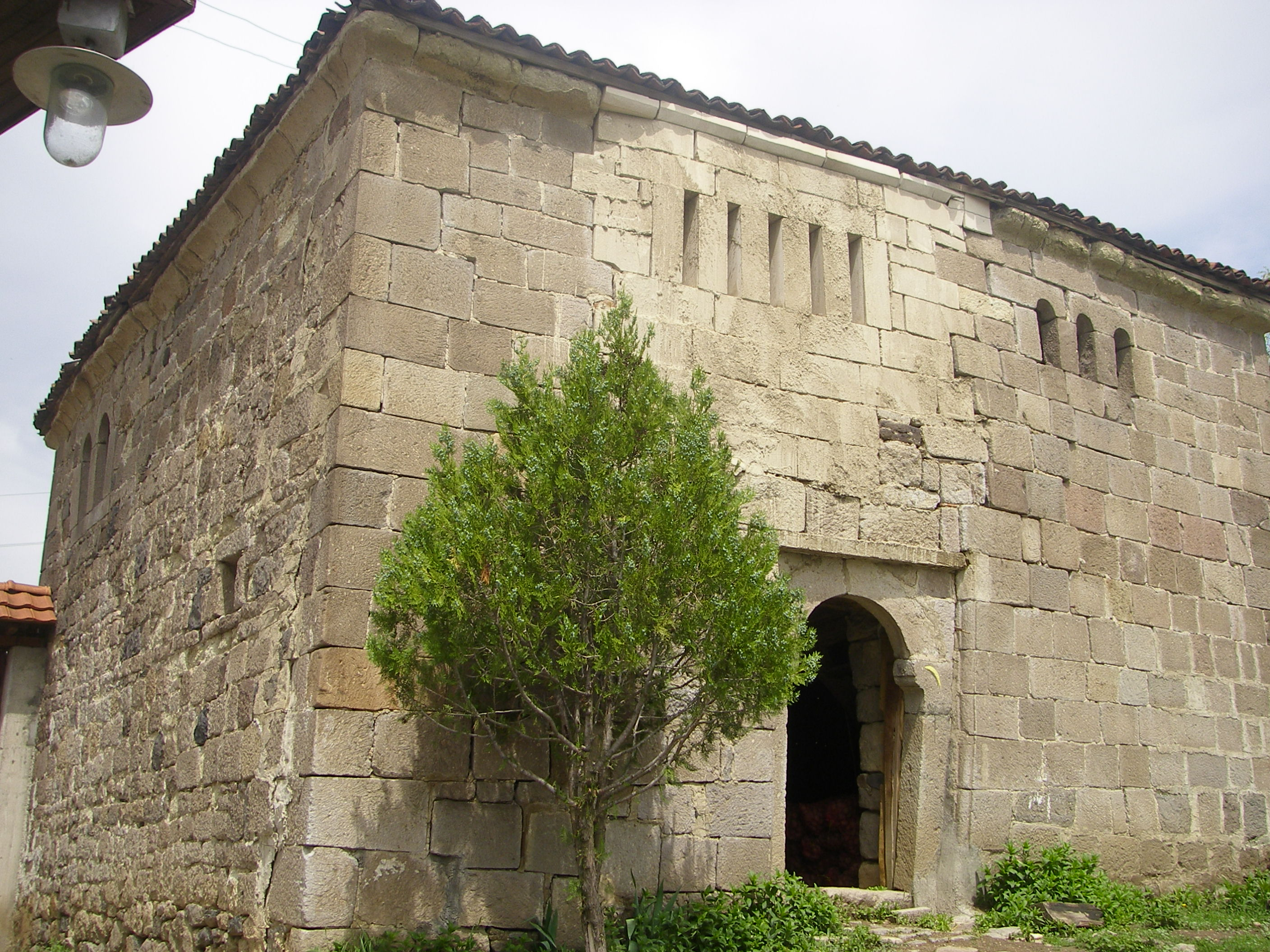
- Interactive map of Tupella Family Tower House
- Location: Mitrovica, Kosovo

History
- Built: 19th century

The Tupella Family Tower House is a cultural heritage monument in Mitrovica, Kosovo.

== History ==
The wealthy Kosovo Albanian Tupella family built the house in the early 19th century. In 1912, the Kingdom of Yugoslavia’s government commandeered it as a prison for local dissidents. The tower house saw violence during the Kosovo Operation (1944). It was also used for torture and killings during a show trial over confiscated weaponry in 1956. Today, families live there who were expelled from northern Mitrovica.
