= Stracin–Kumanovo operation =

1944 offensive of World War II in Yugoslavia

- Part of World War II in Yugoslavia
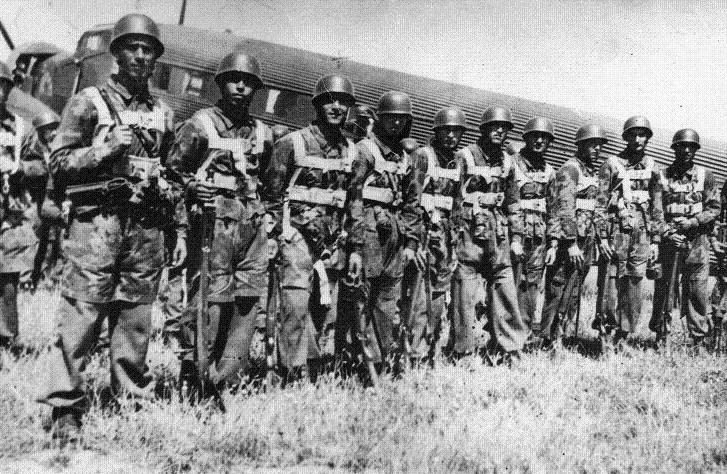
- Bulgarian paratroopers who participated in the battle on Strazhin.
Date	October 8 – November 14, 1944
Location	Kriva Palanka, Stracin, Kumanovo, Skopje
Result	Allied victory

Belligerents
Bulgaria; Yugoslav Partisans	(Nazi Germany) Germany: (German occupation of Albania) Albanian Kingdom; Chetniks Balli Kombëtar

Commanders and leaders
Vladimir Stoychev (Yugoslav Partisans) Kosta Jašmakov	(Nazi Germany) Alexander Löhr

Units involved
1st Bulgarian Army: 1st Sofia Infantry Division; 2nd Thracian Infantry Division; 11th Infantry Division; 1st Sofia Guard Division; 2nd Cavalry Division; 42nd Macedonian Division: 3rd Macedonian Brigade; 12th Macedonian Brigade	Army Group E: 11th Luftwaffe Field Division; 41st Infantry Division; 22nd Air Landing Division; Chetnik auxiliaries; 21st SS Skanderbeg; Balli Kombëtar

Strength
Unknown	100 guns and mortars 35–40 tanks and vehicles

Casualties and losses
2,091 killed, 6,273 wounded and 577 missing (Yugoslav Partisans) Unknown	Unknown

The Stracin–Kumanovo operation (Bulgarian: Страцинско-Кумановска операция) was an offensive operation conducted in 1944 by the Bulgarian Army against German forces in occupied Yugoslavia which culminated in the capture of Skopje in 1944. With the Bulgarian declaration of war on Germany on September 8, followed by the Bulgarian withdrawal from the area, the German 1st Mountain Division moved north, occupied Skopje, and secured the strategic Belgrade–Nis–Salonika railroad line. On October 14, withdrawing from Greece, Army Group E faced Soviet and Bulgarian divisions advancing in Eastern Serbia and Vardar Macedonia; by November 2, the last German units left Northern Greece.

By early October, Bulgarian forces were breaking through into eastern Serbia, Vardar Macedonia and Kosovo in support of the Soviet advance towards Belgrade. Although the Bulgarian army drove the Germans out of Skopje and what is now North Macedonia, later Yugoslav and contemporary Macedonian historiography has downplayed its role for ethnopolitical reasons. Accounts of these events in post-war Yugoslav literature give the impression that the Germans were driven out by the communist Partisans who liberated the area. There was some fighting by the Yugoslav Partisans, but their actions were insignificant compared with Bulgarian military activity. The greeting of Bulgarian troops in Skopje as liberators at the end of the operation is still denied there.

After capturing Skopje on 14 November, the Bulgarian Second Army and the Yugoslav Partisans kept driving the Albanian SS Division and the Balli Kombëtar back, until Kosovo had been seized.

== Development ==
=== Bulgarian military activity ===
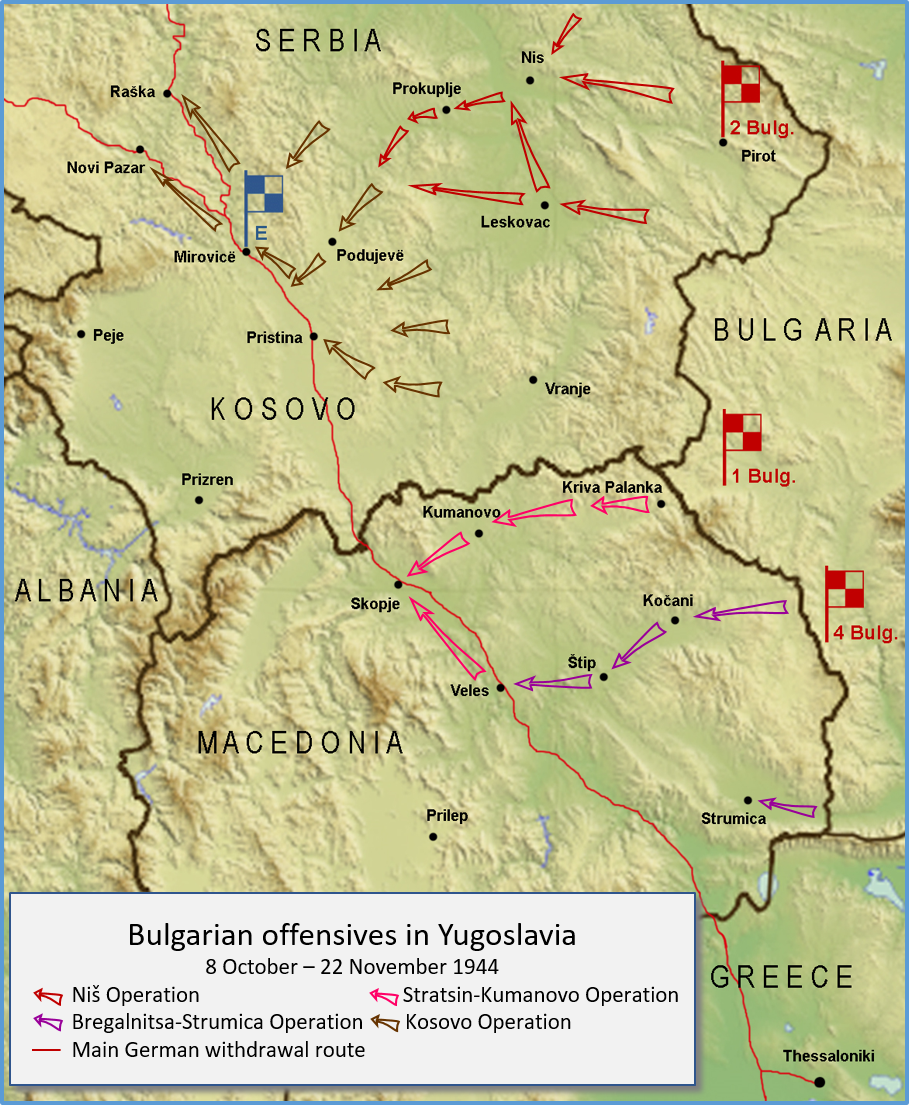
Map of the October–November 1944 Bulgarian offensive in Yugoslavia. Its main task was to cover up the Soviet advance to Belgrade.

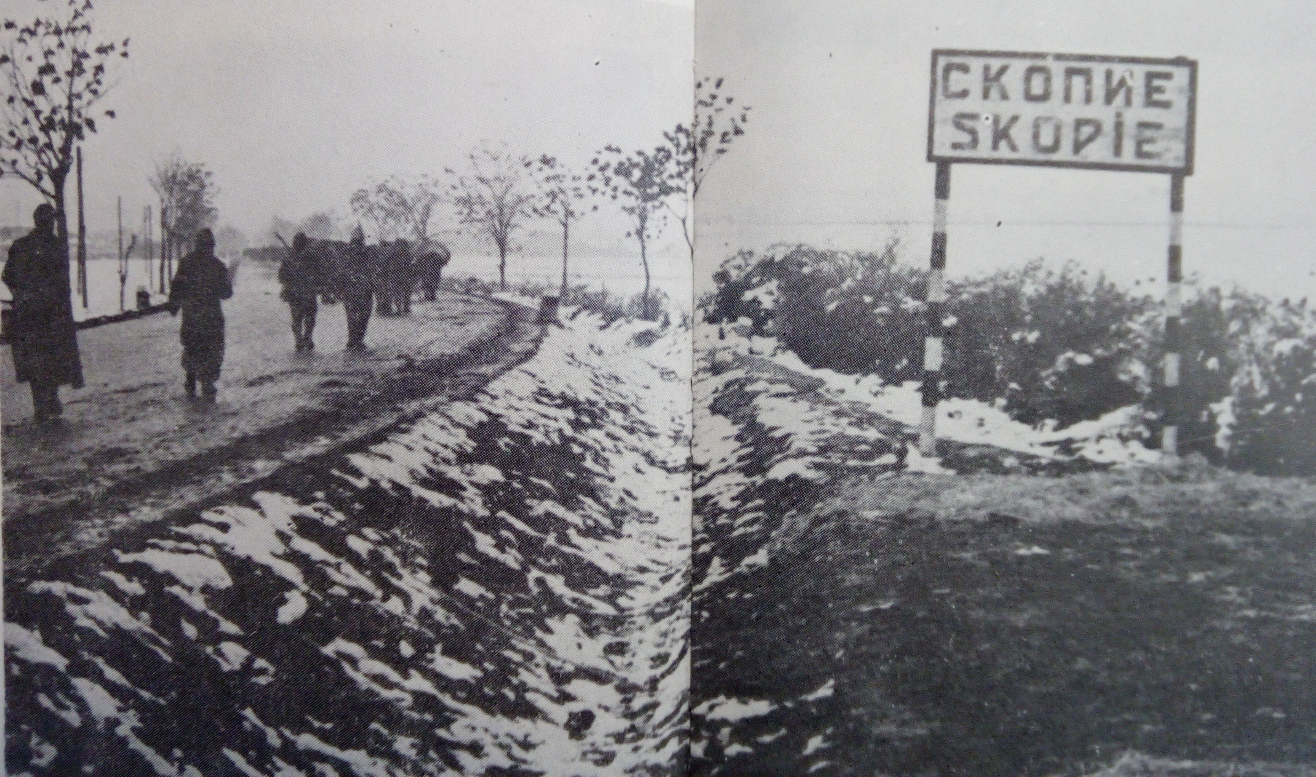
Bulgarian troops entering Skopje. According to Bulgarian sources they were the first to enter the city (on November 13 at 6:30 pm). According to German historians, the city was abandoned to the Bulgarians early in the morning of November 14.

The operation, from October 8 to November 14, was conducted in parallel with three other Bulgarian offensives in Yugoslavia: the Niš operation, the Kosovo operation and the Bregalnitsa-Strumica operation. The Bulgarians supported the Soviet offensive in the area, which was aided by the Yugoslav, Albanian and Greek Partisans. It was conducted to close the road to retreat for Army Group E from Greece to central Europe. Bulgarian troops began the offensive on October 8, entering Kriva Palanka. They fought for the Stražin ridge on October 18 and seized Stracin on October 25 with support from the Bulgarian Air Force. The battle for Stražin against German air and ground forces was fierce, and it was captured after an attack by Bulgarian paratroopers. Thirty-five paratroopers were killed and 64 were injured, one-fourth of the Parachute Druzhina unit. Battles continued on the Pčinja River and in the city of Kumanovo (on 11 November), where portions of the Wehrmacht were pushed back. The Bulgarians developed the advance towards Skopje into a large-scale offensive, raising the possibility of cutting off Army Group E. The situation was desperate, and the town was evacuated finally during the night of November 13/14. On November 13 and 14, portions of the First and Fourth Bulgarian Armies entered Skopje. The onslaught continued as part of the Kosovo operation, and Bulgarian troops captured Pristina on November 19.

=== Capture of Skopje ===
Parallel to the Soviet advance in Eastern Serbia, Bulgarian forces south and south-west of Niš threatened the last German troop-withdrawal route from Skopje. To avoid being cut off, the German command in Mitrovica deployed portions of the 22nd Air Landing Division in the city, while the 11th Luftwaffe Field Division shielded the operational area to the north at Pristina. A crisis arose during the fighting at Pristina in early November, when the 11th Luftwaffe Field Division gave way under Bulgarian attacks. The army group established a new blocking line, enabling the German position at Skopje to be held. The offensive of the Bulgarians, which attacked well-equipped with the support of tanks and fighter planes in the Skopje area, forced the Germans to evacuate their forces, which they carried out on schedule; their main forces abandoned Skopje on 11–12 November. Taking advantage of this situation, the Macedonian partisans launched their attacks from Vodno in the direction of Kisela Voda aimed towards the city square and the stone bridge. Army Group E report confirmed the attacks and partisan movement in the western part of the city on 13 November. According to Army Group F report, the partisans managed to penetrate into the southwestern parts of Skopje in the afternoon but were soon repulsed. The Bulgarian High Command also noted in a telegram that they had reports of partisans entering Skopje at 15:00 on 13 November. The telegram likely referred to the clashes reported by the German daily reports. The Bulgarian forces entered the city on 13 November at dusk, and at the same date reached the city center. However, the official German reports does not confirm this. According to the daily reports from the Germans, the remaining troops abandoned Skopje on the midnight 13/14 November, and Bulgarian advance guard entered the city on the morning of 14 November. According to the Bulgarian researcher Nikolay Koychev, the penetration of the first Bulgarian unit into Skopje at 6:30 p.m. on November 13, was not confirmed in German documents, because by that time the majority of German units had already completed their withdrawal northwest of the city and accordingly the Bulgarian platoon, invading from the south-southeast, encountered no enemy in front of it to report on. Simultaneously, an independent Bulgarian detachment, whose task was to quickly advance towards Skopje, reached the city at around 11 p.m. and, after a brief skirmish with straggling German units, took control of its eastern district and at midnight patrols penetrated the entire city. A German report on the activities of Tito's partisans dated November 17, 1944, provides information that on November 14, the General Staff of NOVJ in Macedonia ordered two partisan brigades to move towards Skopje and enter the city, which the Bulgarians had already captured.

Skopje was seized with the decisive role of Bulgarian troops. On a series of Army Group E maps of its withdrawal through Vardar Macedonia and southern Serbia and in the memoirs of its chief of staff, there is almost no indication of Yugoslav Partisan units. According to the Allied Commission's British commissioner in Sofia, General Walter Oxley, who visited the front line in Stracin, the task of the Bulgarian army was to advance west and cut the Skopje-Pristina-Kraljevo rail line. Oxley noted that the Bulgarians were given freedom of action, and no Soviet troops were in the area of its offensive. Oxley reported that a small number of Yugoslav partisans were in the area of the Bulgarian operations, but it was difficult for them to take serious action against the well-organised German units. Impressed by the discipline of the Bulgarian soldiers, he noted that it was a problem for the partisans. Oxley wrote that Skopje was seized after weak German resistance with Bulgarian Army attacks, and the partisans held back until the Bulgarians entered the city. According to an agreement between Bulgarian and Yugoslav authorities, the Bulgarian troops coordinated their entry into the city with the Yugoslav partisans. The Bulgarians retained their prisoners of war, but gave weapons abandoned by the Germans to Josip Broz Tito's partisans. Units of the Fourth Bulgarian Army entered Skopje early in the morning of 14 November, and the last nests of German resistance were cleared. According to a November 15 summary by the Army Group E intelligence staff chief, units of the 4th Bulgarian Army (the 5th Infantry Division) and the 1st Bulgarian Army (the 2nd Infantry Division) seized the city after the withdrawal of German troops. News that Skopje was captured by the Bulgarians was reported on November 14 and 15 by Radio Moscow, Radio London, Voice of America, and Radio Sofia. On November 14, Macedonian partisans from the First Corps sent a telegram to the main headquarters of the Yugoslav Partisans, denouncing the news reported by Radio Sofia that the Bulgarian army had liberated Veles and Skopje. Military realities indeed confirmed that Skopje was captured by Bulgarian forces, as many other towns of Macedonia. The hostile mood of the partisans did not prevent the visit of the Minister of War Damyan Velchev to the city. He arrived there on November 14 and took part in the Bulgarian parade in Skopje.

After the liberation of Skopje, the new Macedonian authorities confiscated лв.430 million, stamps, and other securities from the former Bulgarian National Bank building. They refused to give the funds to Sofia, and General Damyan Velchev ordered a Bulgarian artillery regiment to return from South Serbia to shell Skopje and confiscate the funds. The order was rescinded after the intervention of Marshal of the Soviet Union Fyodor Tolbukhin, preventing an armed conflict. Bulgarian currency had been used by the short-lived pro-German puppet government, and remained in use during the rule of the new Macedonian communist authorities.

== Legacy ==
=== Descriptions of events ===
In the autumn of 1944, the Bulgarian army was the primary force which drove the Germans out of Vardar Macedonia. The Macedonian Partisans were not a significant military force; they were ill-equipped, lacked tanks, artillery and airplanes, and relied on guerrilla warfare. Before the Tito-Stalin split in 1948, General Mihajlo Apostolski wrote that it was tactically advantageous to include the reorganized Bulgarian army in the Macedonian war against the Germans. In a congratulatory telegram, sent by Dimitar Vlahov and Lazar Koliševski to the Bulgarian High Command from December 1944, there were "anti-fascist fraternal greetings" and was asked to convey congratulations to the Bulgarian People's Army, which helped to completely liberate Vardar Macedonia from the fascist occupiers.

As a result of the Tito–Stalin split from 1948, however, Yugoslav and (later) Macedonian historiography has minimized Bulgaria's role. According to Macedonian sources, the Bulgarians did not participate in the capture of Skopje even as observers. According to Apostolski, Skopje was liberated by Yugoslav partisans after several days of heavy fighting. Partisan Jordan Cekov wrote that street battles to liberate western Skopje ended late in the evening of November 13, but continued in the city's eastern half. One Bulgarian unit had nearly reached the center of Skopje by about 3 am on November 14, but it was pushed back to the outskirts by the Partisans and was not allowed to reenter the city until noon. According to Partisan Trajko Stamatoski, there were attempts by some Bulgarian units to claim credit for the liberation of Skopje, but "we did not allow it then, or today". Macedonian politician Boro Čuškar claimed that a parade by the Bulgarian troops was prevented and that they were not involved in the liberation of Skopje. Macedonian historians as Aleksandar Matkovski even claimed Skopje was liberated from German-Bulgarian occupation on 13 November 1944.

According to the Macedonian Goce Delčev Brigade commander and first commandant of Skopje after its liberation, Petar Traykov, Apostolski wrote he had liberated Skopje and did not even allow Bulgarian troops to enter the city. Goce Delčev Brigade member Metodi Karpachev said that his unit entered Skopje on the morning of November 14 to find it seized by Bulgarian troops. The population did not welcome the partisans with their expected enthusiasm, and Karpachev later joined the Bulgarian forces. Bulgarian artillery observer Boris Garnev stated that his unit received no welcome at all by the population upon entering Skopje on 14 November. He also noted that the victory rally, decorated with flowers, featured speeches by Macedonian leaders including Krste Crvenkovski, Metodija Andonov-Čento, and Dimitar Vlahov, and that the Bulgarian flag was barred from being displayed on the podium alongside the Allied flags. Bulgarian sources say that the first unit, which entered Skopje on November 13 at 6:30 pm, was the cavalry intelligence platoon of the Second Infantry Division of the 4th Bulgarian Army after the main German force had left the city. The Second Infantry Division of the First Bulgarian Army took its southern and eastern areas at 11 pm, and the Bulgarians seized the city center at midnight. Because the bridges and other approaches to Skopje had been destroyed by the Germans, only infantry and cavalry units entered the city first. Strategic parts of the city had been mined by the retreating Germans, and Bulgarian sappers de-mined them. Per Helmut Friebe, the Vardar Stone Bridge was originally slated for demolition. At the request of the city council, who guaranteed the unimpeded passage of the last German troops, the commanding officer was persuaded to refrain from blowing up it. In return, the last German units passing through were ambushed with fire.

=== 21st century views ===
Macedonian media, such as Vo Centar, continue to spread the untruth that Skopje was liberated by Yugoslav communist guerrillas from the Bulgarian fascist occupiers. According to the Bulgarian Association for Research and Development of Civil Society, the WW2 Macedonian film The Liberation of Skopje evokes anti-Bulgarian sentiment.

In October 2019, the Bulgarian government proposed strict terms for North Macedonia's EU admission. One condition is for both countries to "harmonize" their World War II historical narratives, with North Macedonia tempering its view of Bulgaria. In a November 2020 interview with Bulgarian media, North Macedonia's then-Prime Minister Zoran Zaev acknowledged the involvement of Bulgarian troops in the capture of Skopje and other towns during the war, and that the Bulgarians were not fascist occupiers. The interview was followed by a wave of nationalism in Skopje, with protests demanding Zaev's resignation; opposition leader Hristijan Mickoski accused him of threatening Macedonian national identity.

According to former Macedonian Prime Minister Ljubčo Georgievski, the reaction was the result of ignorance, hypocrisy or politics. Vlado Bučkovski, another former prime minister and chief negotiator with Bulgaria, stated a week later, amid the campaign against Zaev, that the Macedonians and Bulgarians were a single people, separated by the post-WWII Yugoslav policy. Journalist Dejan Azeski said in the weekly newspaper Fokus that Zaev's interview was politically unwise but factually accurate. Azeski recognised that what has been happened in North Macedonia, has been the result of the misinterpretation of history, taught there after WWII. Bulgaria denies any occupation during the war and insists on double liberation (in 1941 and 1944).

== Gallery ==
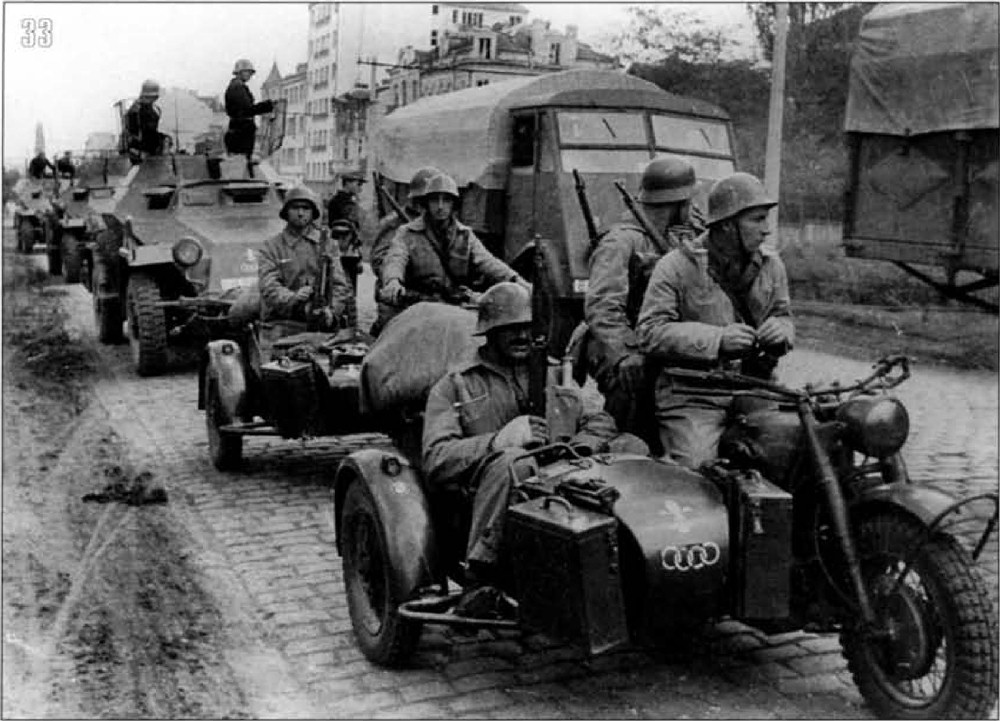
Bulgarians re-entering occupied Yugoslavia

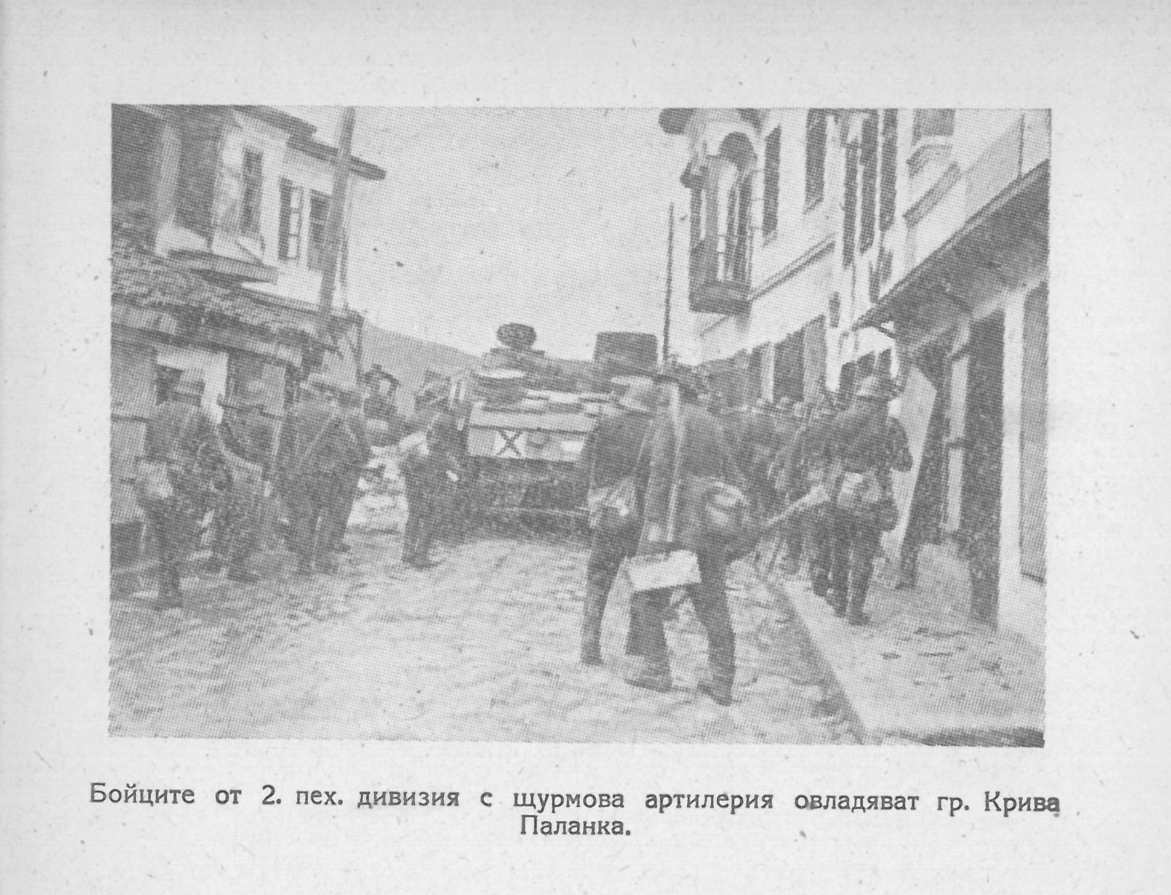
Bulgarian troops entering Kriva Palanka, Macedonia

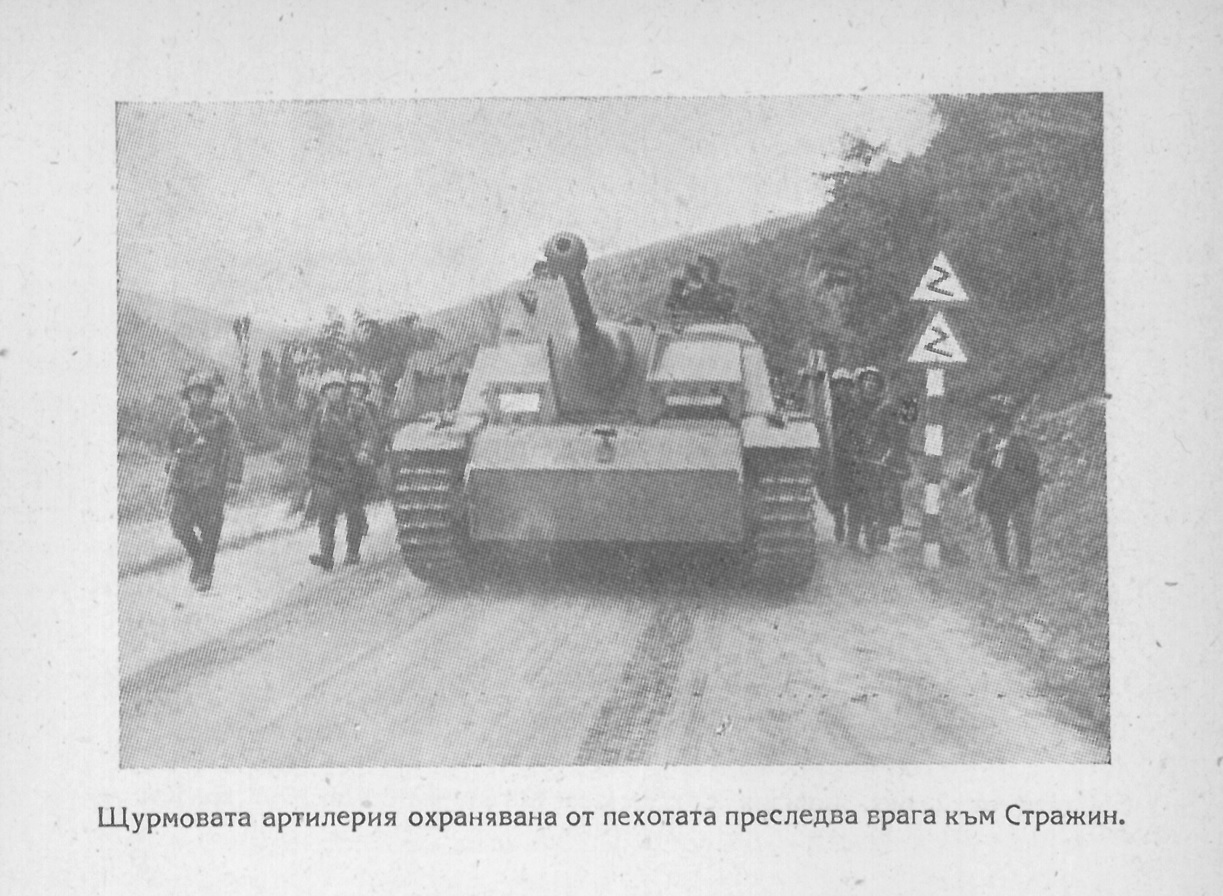
Bulgarians advancing toward the ridge of Stražin

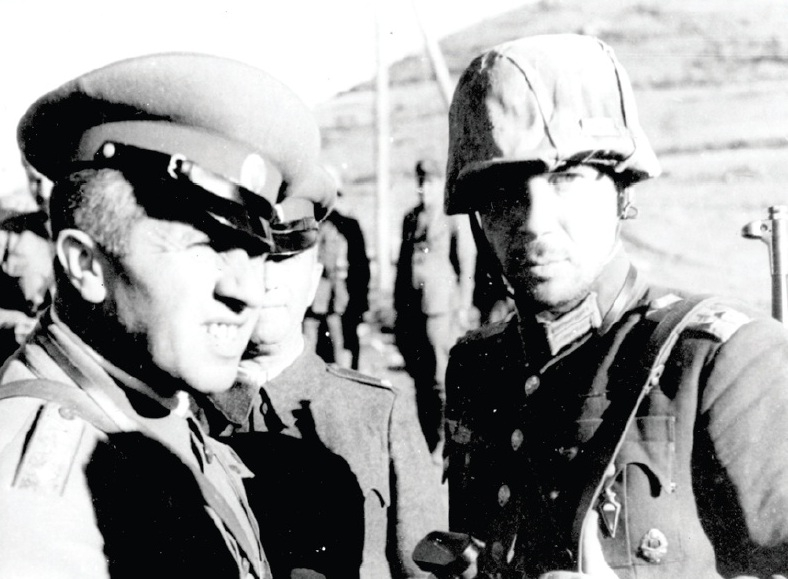
Vladimir Stoychev and the commander of the Parachute Company, after the breakthrough at Strazhin.

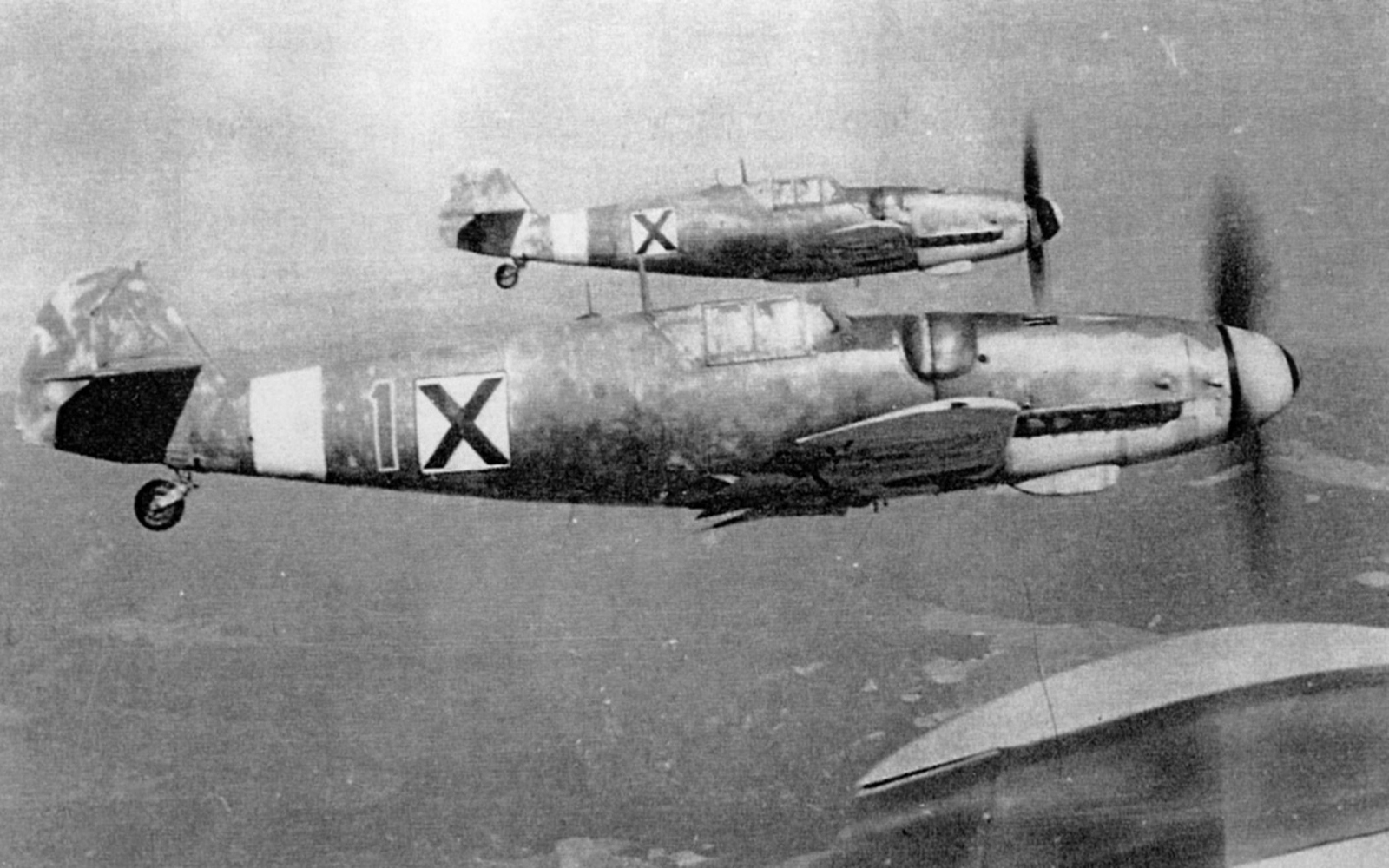
Bulgarian Messerschmitt Bf 109s in the autumn of 1944

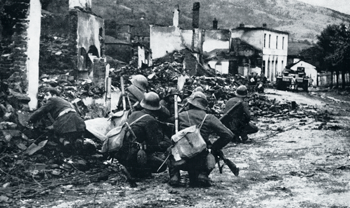
Bulgarian soldiers in the battle for Kumanovo

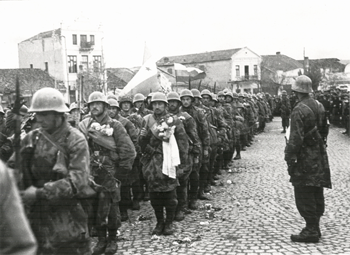
Bulgarian Parachute Druzhina troops welcomed in Kumanovo

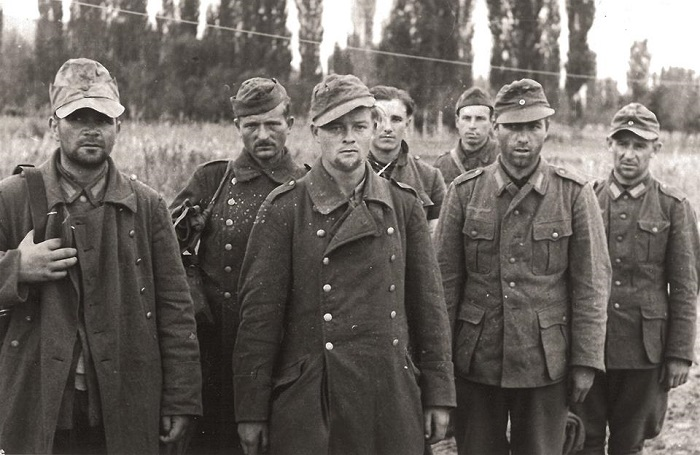
German soldiers captured by Bulgarians near Kumanovo

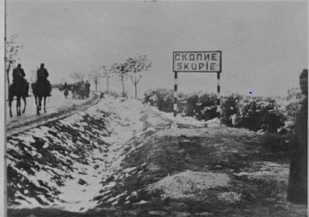
Bulgarian troops entering Skopje on November 13

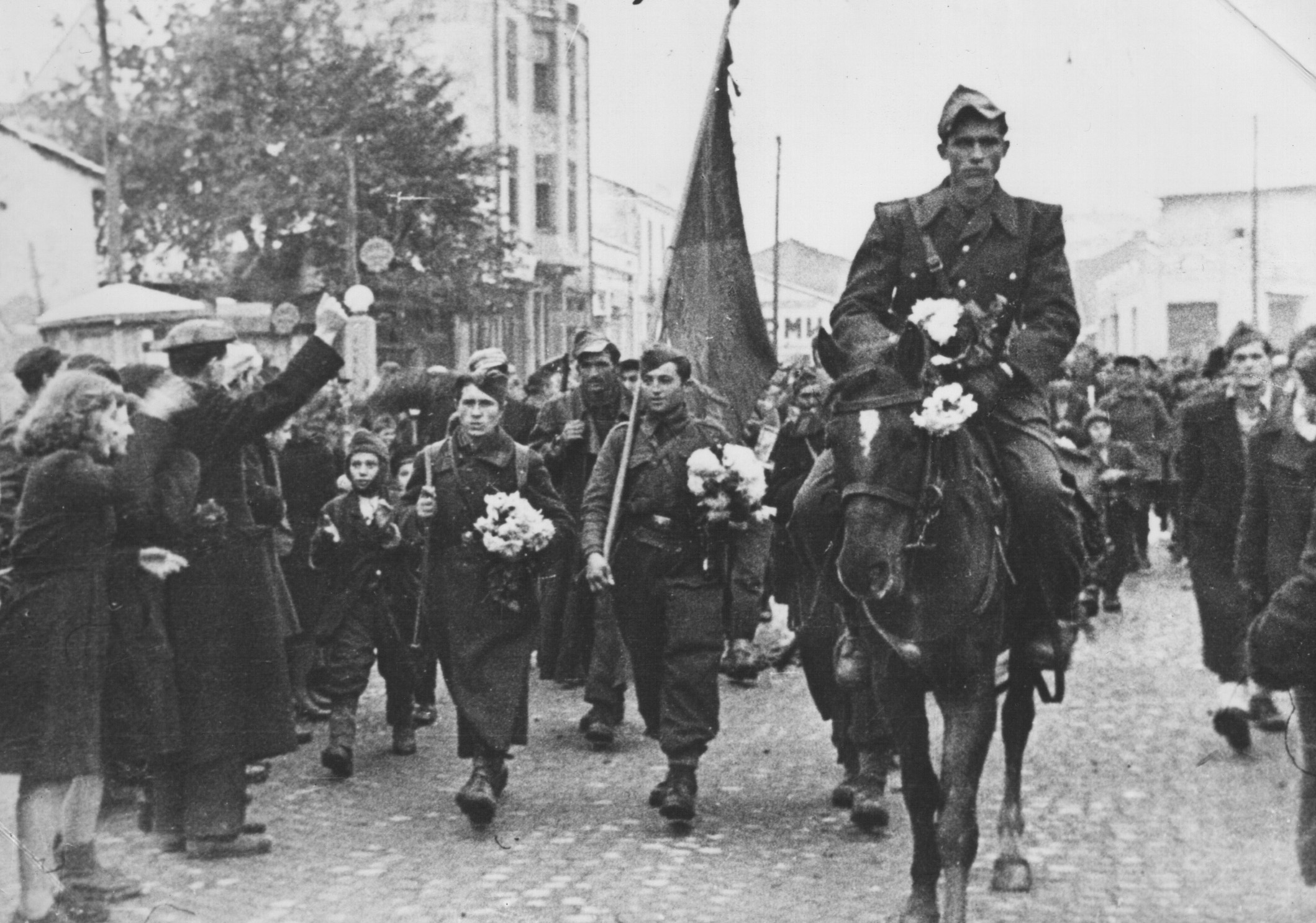
Entry of the 42nd Macedonian Division into Skopje on November 14.

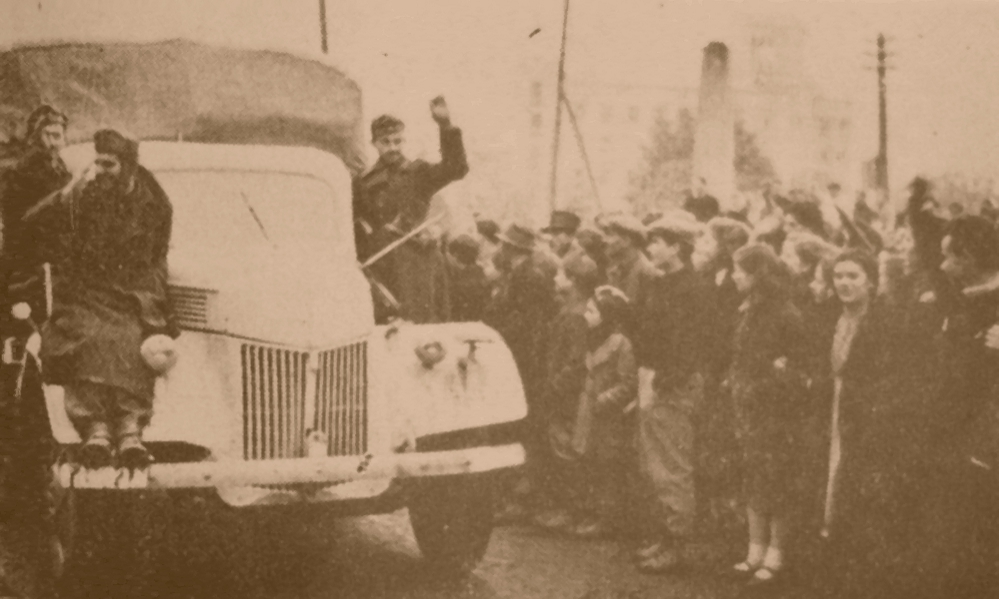
Bulgarian troops greeted as liberators in Skopje on 14 November.

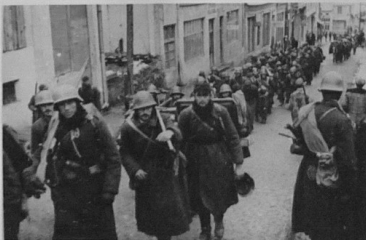
Bulgarian troops in Skopje on November 14, 1944.

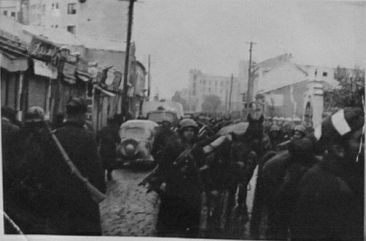
Bulgarian troops in Skopje on November 14, 1944.

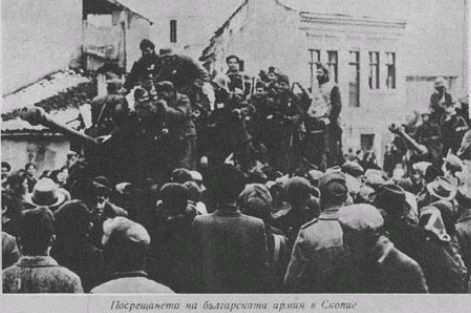
Bulgarian troops welcomed in Skopje on November 14.

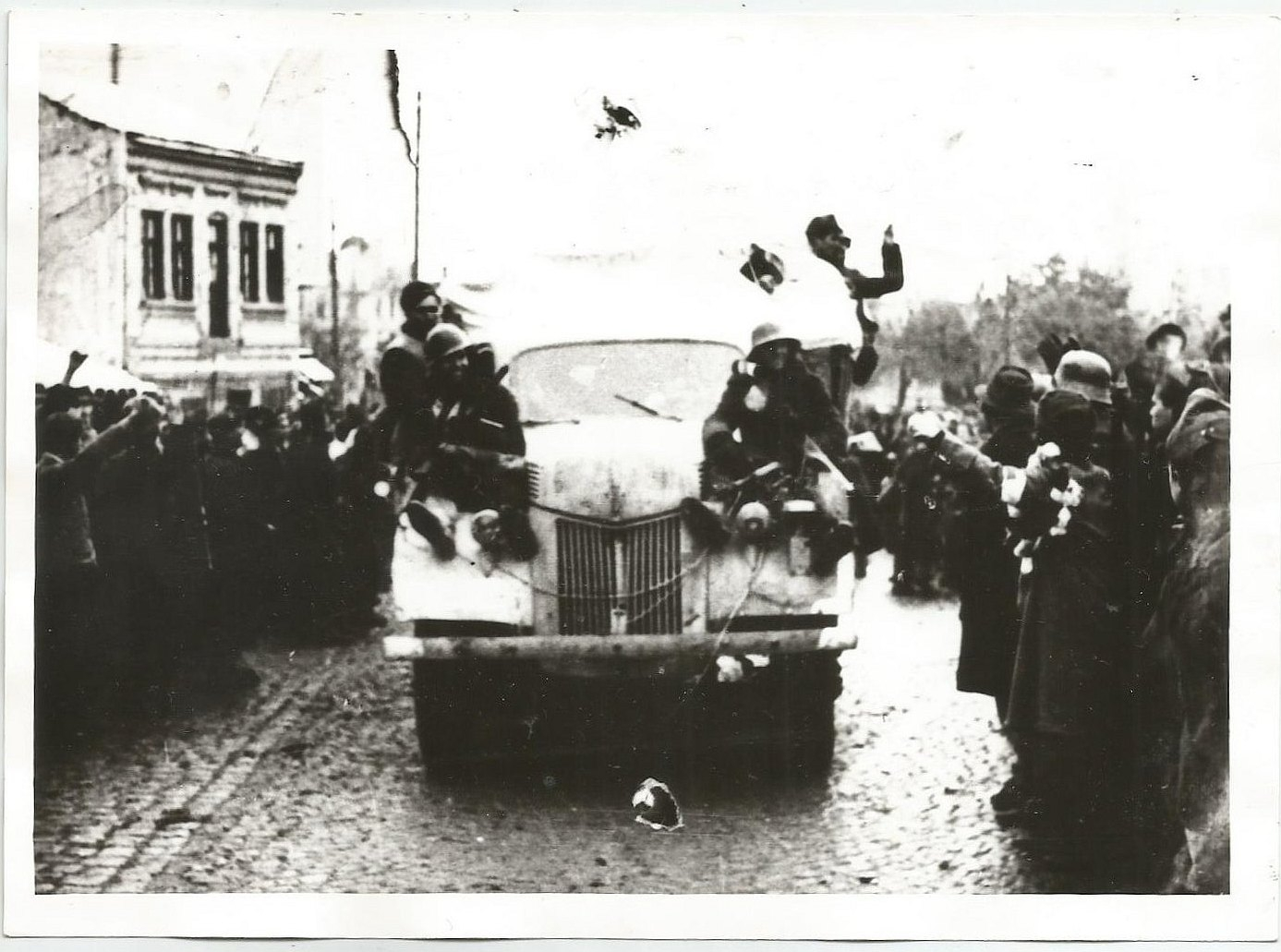
Bulgarian troops welcomed in Skopje on November 14.

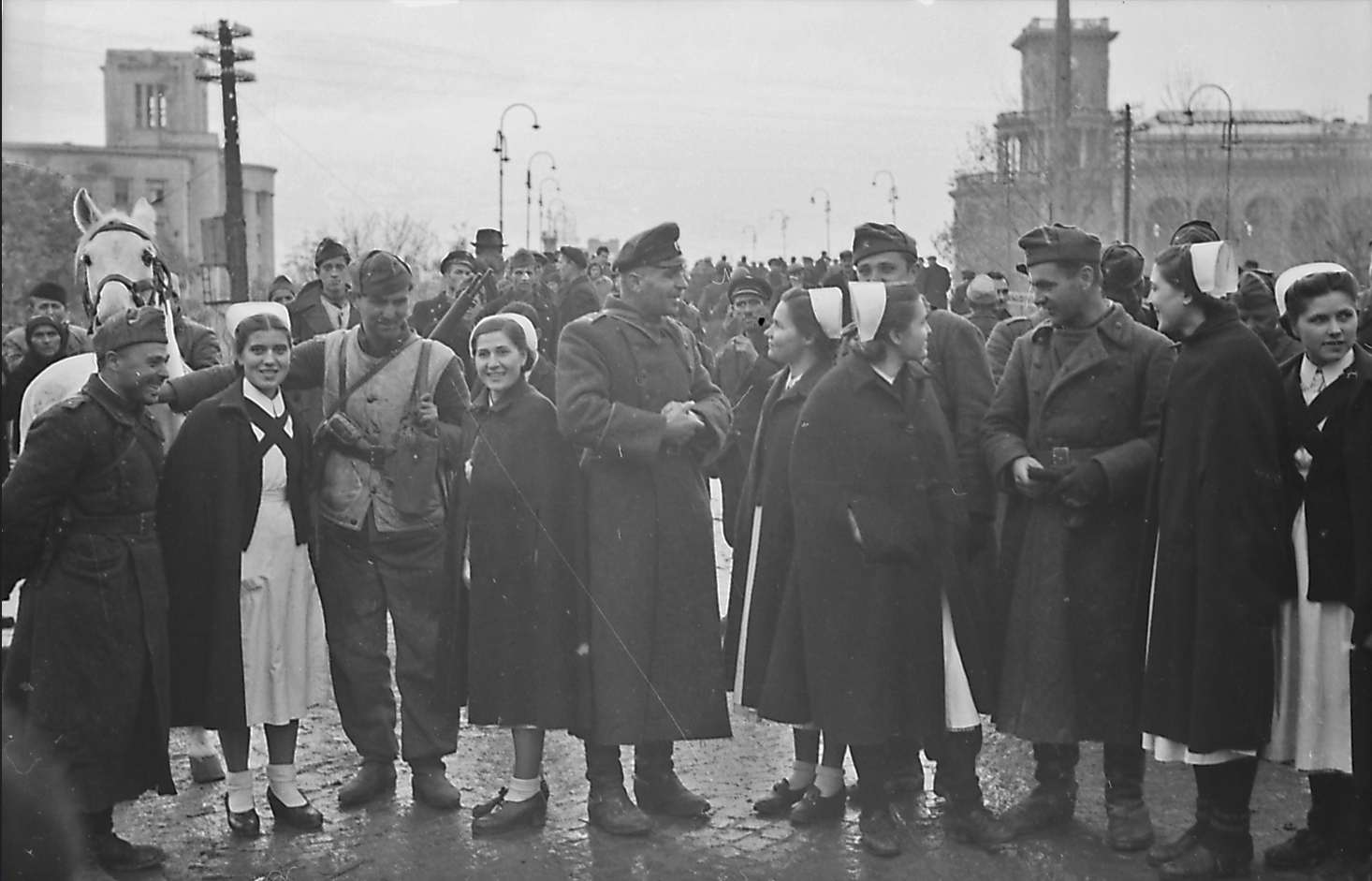
Nurses from Skopje welcome the Bulgarian army on November 14.

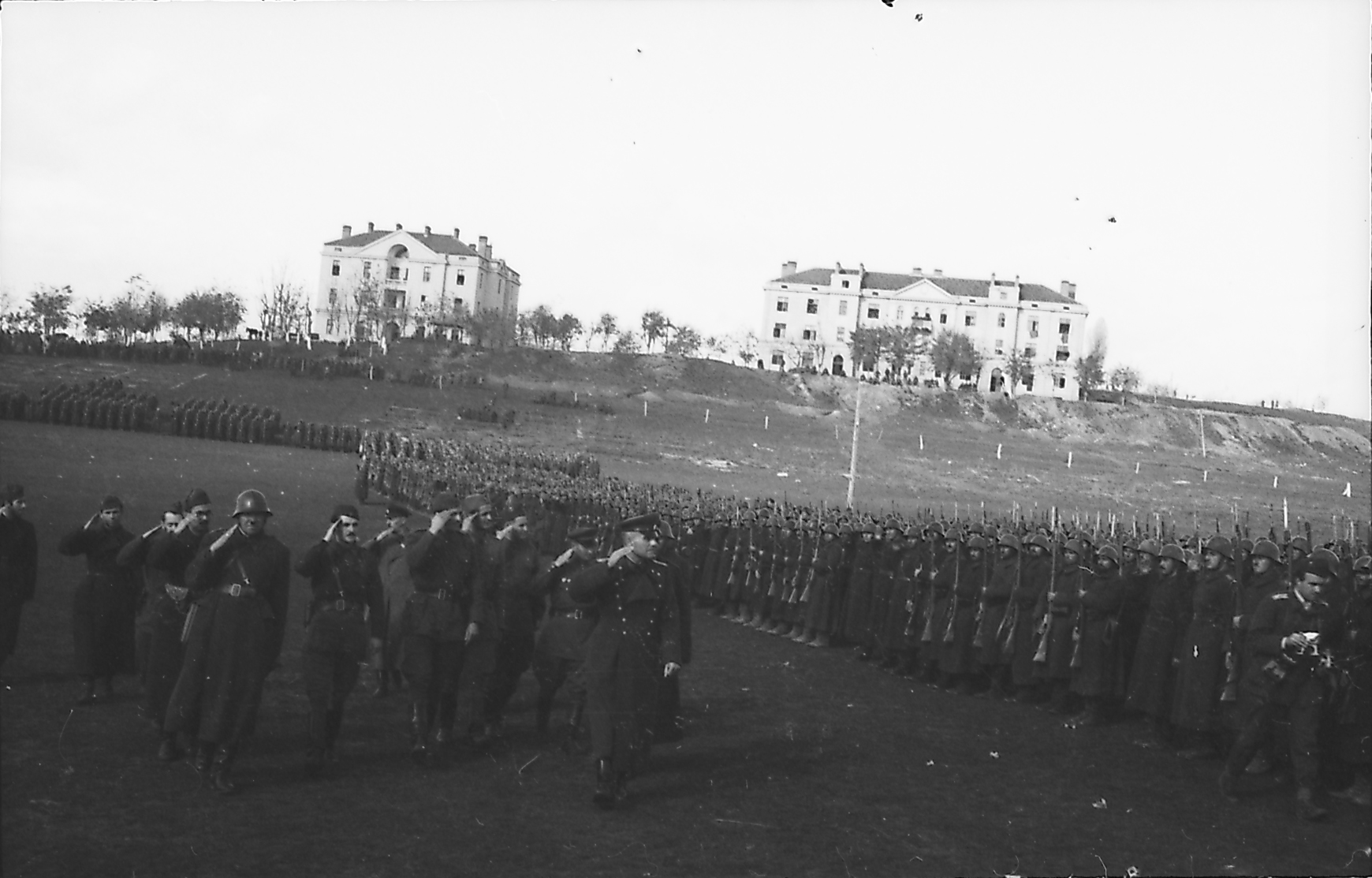
General Damyan Velchev hosts the parade of Bulgarian military units formed on the occasion of the liberation of Skopje in front of the barracks in the city.

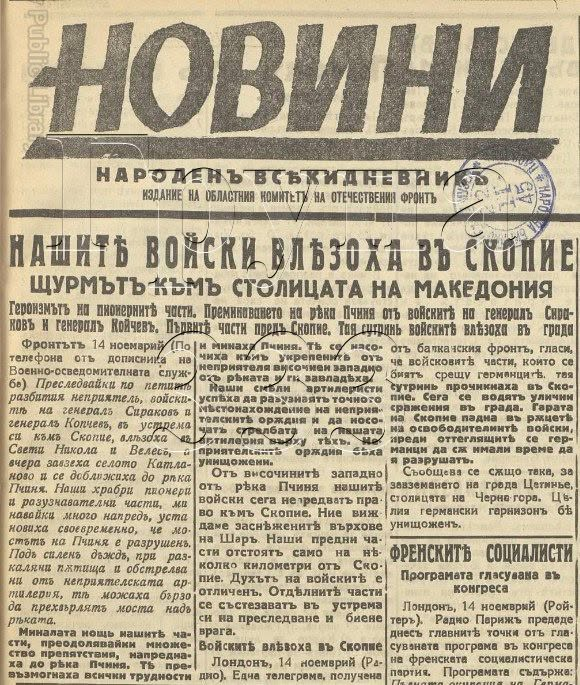
Bulgarian newspaper Novini's article from 14 November on the enter of Bulgarian Army in Skopje.

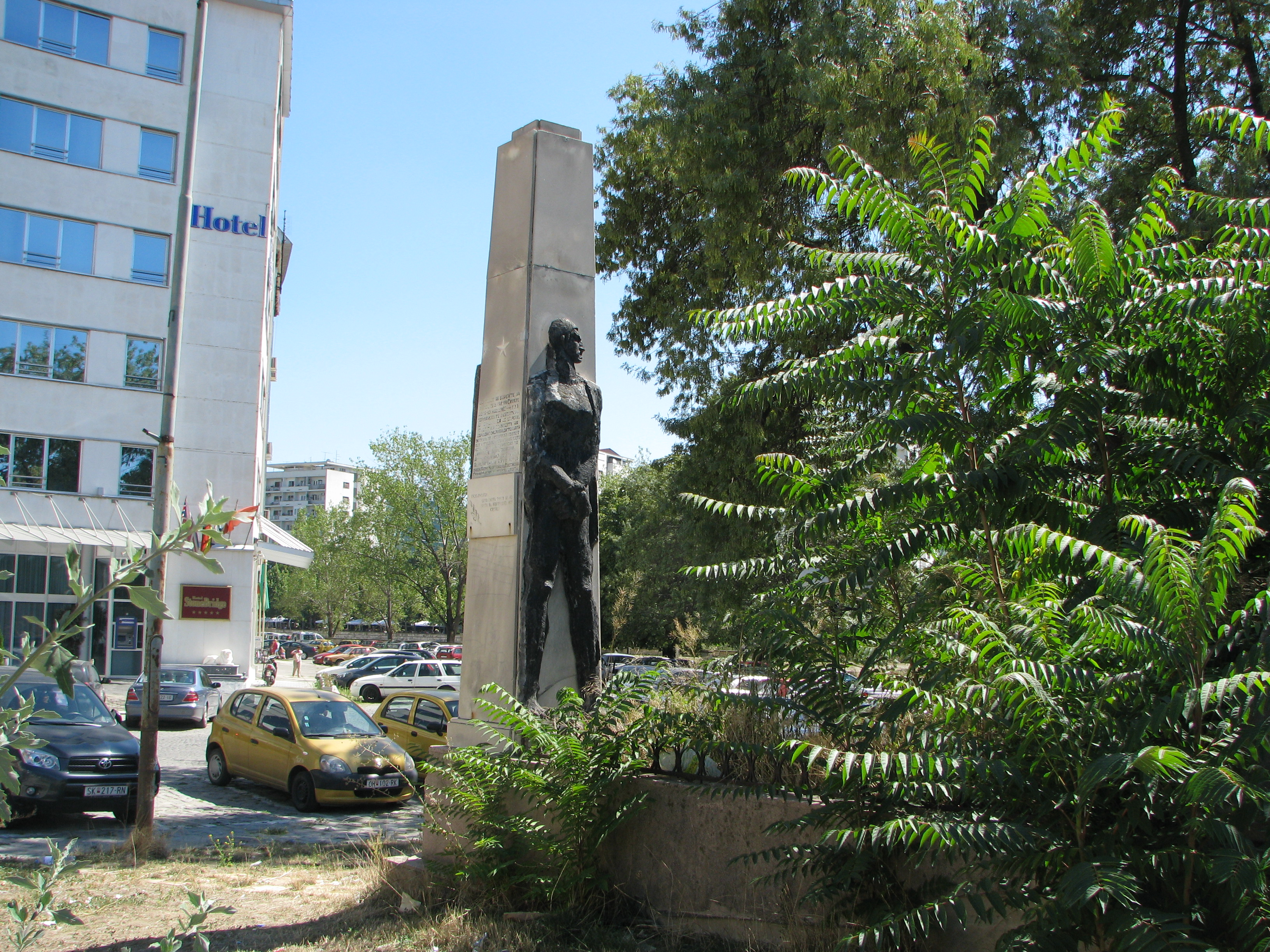
Monument in Skopje in honour of 9 civilians shot by the Germans during their retreat from the city.

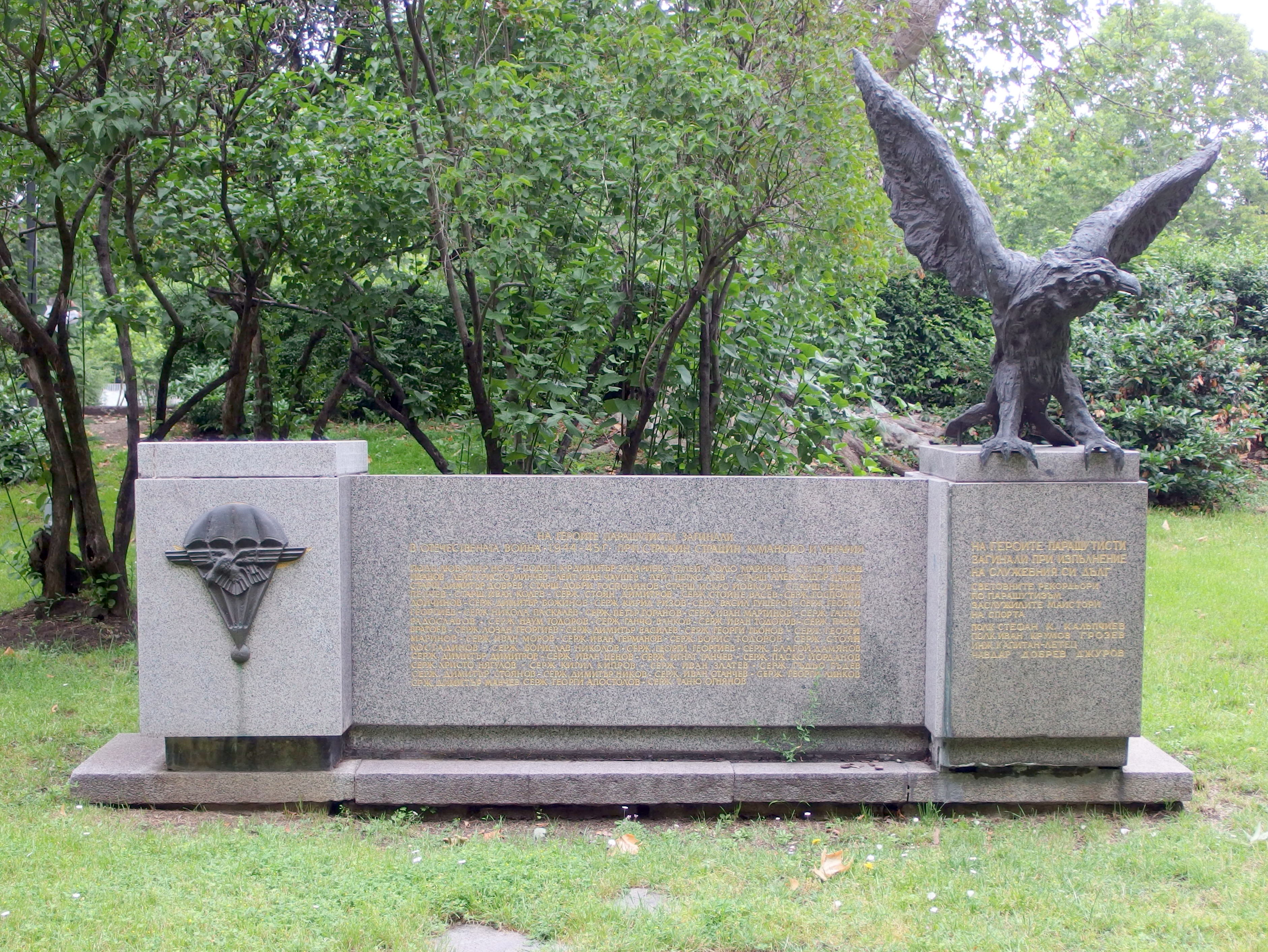
Monument to Bulgarian paratroopers who fell during the Stracin-Kumanovo operation in Sofia.

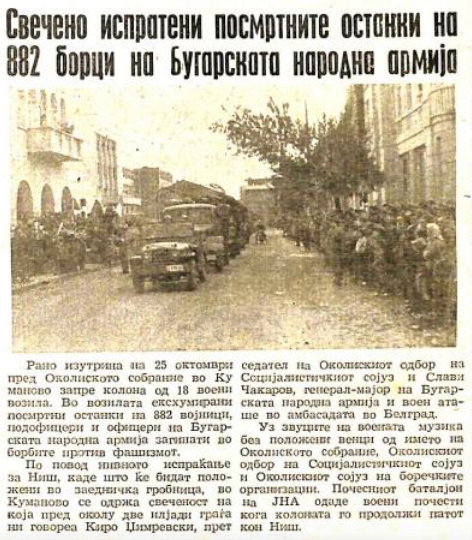
Military convoy in Kumanovo transporting the remains of hundreds of Bulgarian soldiers to a new memorial build in the city of Niš.

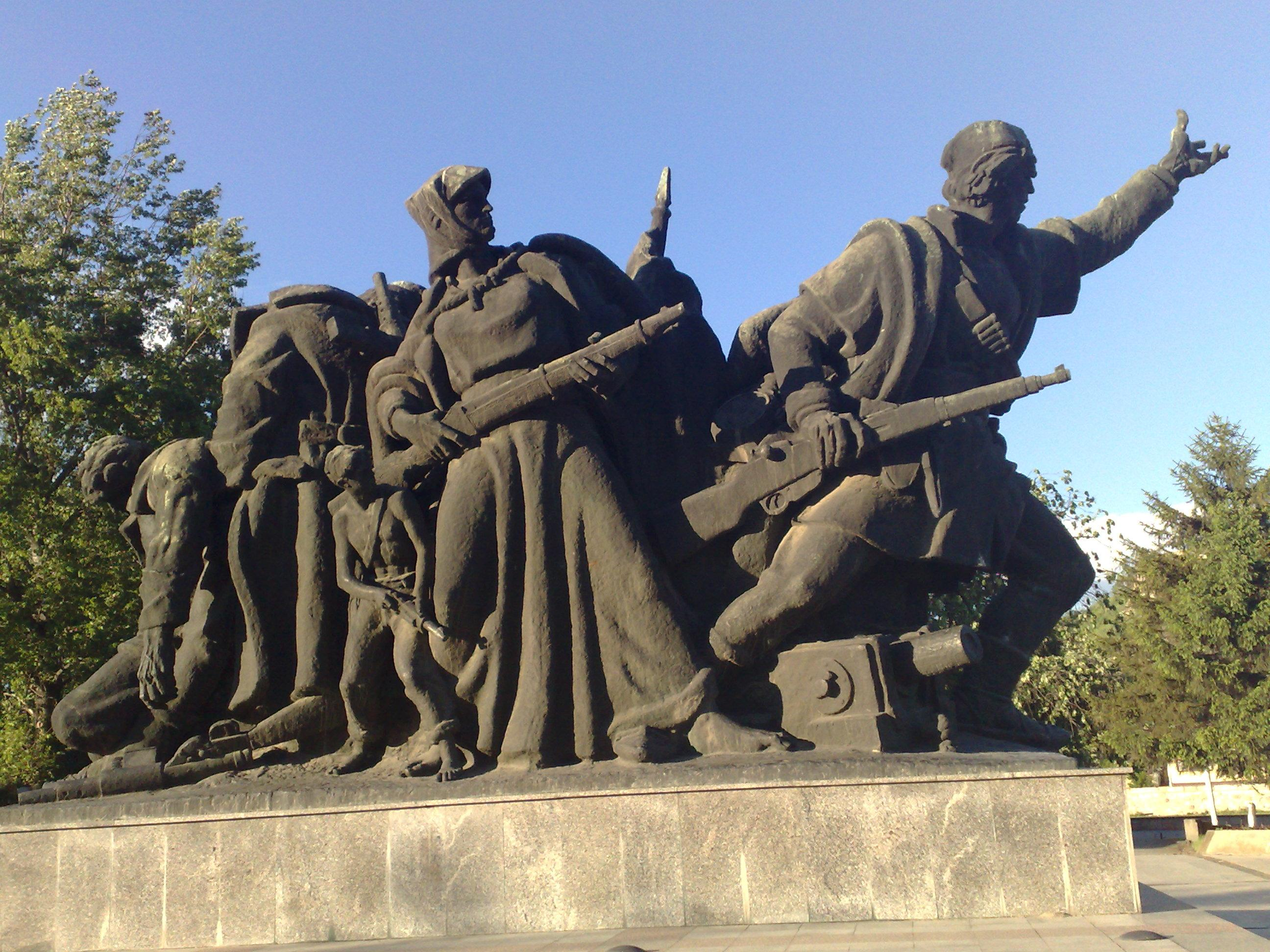
Macedonian monument to the liberators of Skopje, a group of Partisans

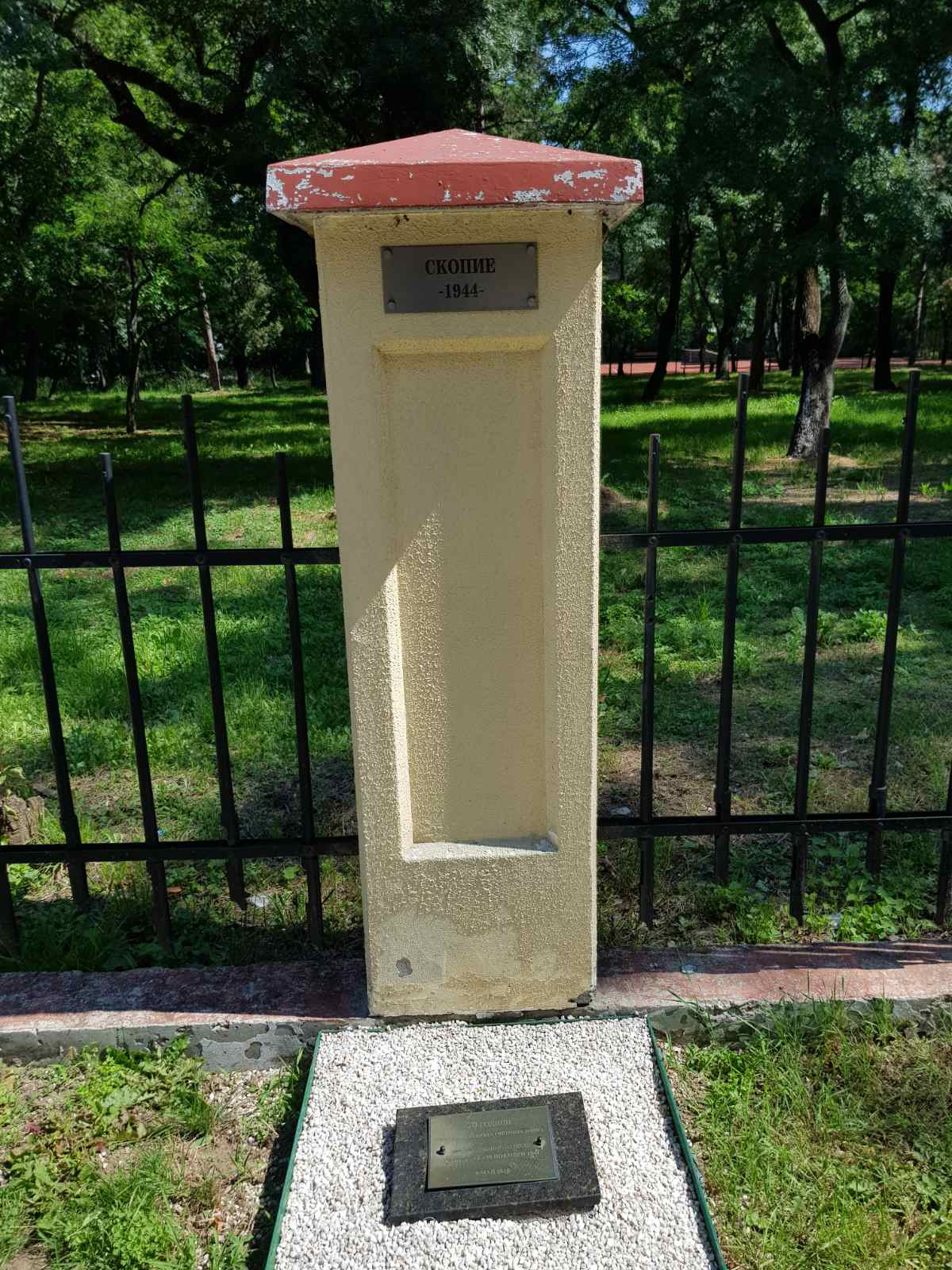
Memorial column at Georgi Rakovski Military Academy palisade, commemorating the battle of Skopje.

== See also ==
- World War II in Yugoslav Macedonia
- Bulgaria during World War II
