= Bregalnitsa–Strumica operation =

Offensive operation of Bulgarian Army during World War II

- Part of World War II in Yugoslavia
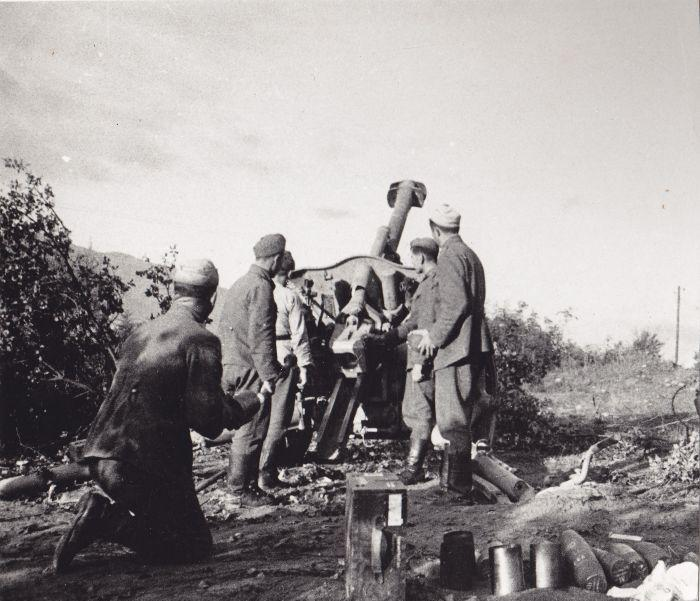
- Artillery position of the Bulgarian army near Strumica, in October 1944.
Date	October 15 – November 14, 1944
Location	Bregalnica, Strumica
Result	Bulgarian-Macedonian victory

Belligerents
Bulgaria; Macedonian Partisans	Germany

Commanders and leaders
(Tsardom of Bulgaria (1908–1946)) Boyan Urumov (until Nov. 1) (Tsardom of Bulgaria (1908–1946)) Asen Sirakov (from Nov. 1)	Helmut Friebe

Units involved
(Tsardom of Bulgaria (1908–1946)) 4th Army: 42,494 men; 85 guns; 180 mortars; NLA: 50th NLA Division; 51st NLA Division	(Nazi Germany) 22nd Infantry Division

Casualties and losses
564 dead; 1,030 wounded; 36 missing	Unknown

The Bregalnitsa–Strumica operation (Bulgarian: Брегалнишко-Струмишка операция) was an offensive operation of Bulgarian Army during World War II in Yugoslav Macedonia. It was held by Fourth Bulgarian army from October 15 to November 14, 1944, and was aimed to secure the left flank of the First Bulgarian Army, blocking the way for retreat of the German group armies 'E' from Greece.

The onslaught of the Army began on October 15. After breaking the enemy resistance, its forces entered Kocani, and later seized the region of Štip. This allowed them to go in pursuit of German troops retreating to the valley of the river Vardar. On November 10, it took control over Veles and three days later assisted the First Bulgarian Army in the Stratsin-Kumanovo operation to take Skopje.

The Macedonian partisans denounced the news reported by Radio Sofia that the Bulgarian army had captured Veles and Skopje. They claimed also, the Bulgarian army committed several crimes—including violence and plundering—against the civilian population.

== See also ==
- Stratsin–Kumanovo operation
- Kosovo operation
- Niš operation
