= Asen Sirakov =

Bulgarian Major-General

- Born: November 2, 1895; Mirkovo, Bulgaria
- Died: January 30, 1960 (aged 64)
- Military career
- Rank: Major General
- Commands: 8th Tundzha Infantry Division; II Bulgarian Occupation Corps; Fourth Bulgarian Army,
- Conflicts: First World War; Second World War

Asen Sirakov (Bulgarian: Асен Сираков; 2 November 1895 – 30 January 1960) was a Bulgarian Major-General who fought in both World Wars.

== Biography ==
Sirakov was born on 2 November 1895 in the village of Mirkovo, Pirdop region. He graduated from the Military School in 1915 and the Military Academy in Sofia in 1928. After the entry of Bulgaria into the First World War, he participated in the war as a platoon and company commander. He was one of the activists of the Military Union from 1930 to 1936 and he took part in the coup d'état on May 19, 1934. Asen Sirakov was a military attache in Budapest from 1935 to 1936 and in Berlin from 1936 to 1938. He was chief of the Procurement Department at the army headquarters from 1938 to 1941. During the period 1941–1944, he was commander of the 8th Tundzha Infantry Division in Stara Zagora, and from 14 May to 30 October 1944 of the II Bulgarian Occupation Corps in Belomorie. On 30 October 1944 he was appointed commander of the Fourth Bulgarian Army, which fought alongside the Soviet Red Army since the September 1944 coup d'état. With his army, he participated in the first phase of Bulgaria's participation in the final defeat of Germany and conducted the Bregalnitsa-Strumica operation in Southern Yugoslavia. In December 1944 he was transferred to the reserve. He was tried by the People's Court, but did not receive a severe sentence due to the advocacy of members of the Military Union participating in the new regime. From 1951 to 1954 he was head of the military department at the Agricultural Academy in Sofia.

== Sources ==
- generals.dk
- Голяма енциклопедия България, Том 10, БАН, ИК „Труд“, 2012 г., стр. 4034
