= Niš operation =

1944 military operation

- Part of the Eastern and Yugoslav fronts of the European theatre of World War II
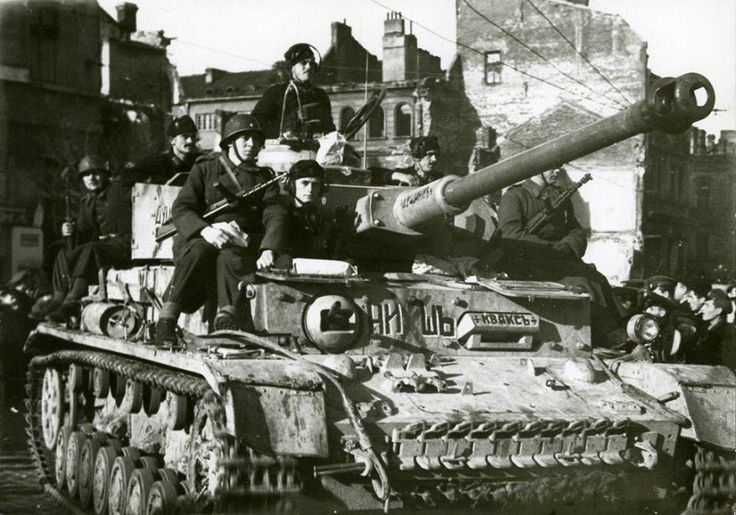
- Bulgarian troops entering Niš in October 1944
Date	October 8–14, 1944
Location	Niš, Occupied Serbia
Result	Allied victory

Belligerents
Bulgaria; Yugoslav Partisans; Soviet Union	(Nazi Germany) Germany: Government of National Salvation; Chetniks

Commanders and leaders
Kiril Stanchev; (Yugoslav Partisans) Koča Popović; (Soviet Union) Sergey Biryuzov	(Nazi Germany) Hans Felber (Government of National Salvation) Milan Nedić (Chetniks) Ljubo Patak

Units involved
Bulgaria: 2nd Bulgarian Army; 4th Division; 6th Division; 9th Division; 12th Division; 2nd Cavalry Division; 1st Sofia Guard Division; 4th Border Brigade; Armoured Brigade; others; (Yugoslav Partisans) National Liberation Army: 13th Corps; 22nd Division; 24th Division; 46th Division; 47th Division; 2nd Proletarian Division; 14th Corps; 45th Division; Partisan Detachments; Soviet Union: Elements of 57th Army; IX Aviation Corps	(Nazi Germany) Wehrmacht and Waffen-SS: 7th SS Mountain Division Prinz Eugen; 11th Luftwaffe Field Division; 22nd Infantry Division; 37th Flak Regiment; Police Battalions; (Government of National Salvation) Serbian collaborators: Serbian State Guard garrison; Chetniks: Chetnik bands

Strength
80,000 men	21,500 men; 154 guns; 164 mortars; 38 tanks; 18 airplanes

Casualties and losses
1,545 dead or wounded	5,200 dead or wounded; 3,580 captured; 97 captured guns; 720 captured machine guns; 1,100 captured vehicles

Niš operation (Serbian: Нишка операција, Bulgarian: Нишка операция) was an offensive operation of the Bulgarian army, supported by Yugoslav Partisans against German Army Group E to secure the left flank of the Third Ukrainian Front of the Red Army.

It was held from October 8–14, 1944. Second Bulgarian Army, in cooperation with Yugoslav People's Liberation Army and IX Air Corps of the Red Army was ordered to destroy the German troops and to seize Niš. Its enemy was 7th SS Volunteer Mountain Division Prinz Eugen, or about 21 500 people from 13 infantry battalions, featuring 154 guns, 164 mortars, 38 tanks and 18 aircraft. Their task was to cover the retreat of 300,000 German soldiers from the composition of the Army Group "E". Bulgarian troops entered the brunt along the River Southern Morava. On October 10, the Sofia armored brigade, consisting of about 150 tanks, most of which Panzer IV, and the rest Panzer 38(t) and Panzer 35(t), aided by ca. 40 Leichter Panzerspähwagen, and 50 Sturmgeschütz III, penetrated in the defense of the Germans and forced them to retreat west of the Southern Morava. On October 12 and 13 Bulgarian troops continue pursuit. On October 14 parts of the VI Infantry Division, using the jab from the south of the armored brigade seized Niš and completely pushed the Nazis. Losses of the Wehrmacht amounted up to 5200 killed and 3850 prisoners of war, but they managed to hold its position in the Vardar corridor to the withdrawal of the remaining German troops.

== Battle Order ==
=== Allied units ===
Bulgarian Army:

- 2nd Army (Major General Kiril Stanchev) (on Oct. 1 - 79,079 men)
- 4th Infantry Division
- 6th Infantry Division
- 9th Infantry Division
- 12th Infantry Division
- 2nd Cavalry Division
- 1st Guards Infantry Division
- Armored Brigade (had German equipment: 78 Maybach T-IV (= PzKw IV), 35 Skoda tanks (= PzKw 35(t)), 10 Prague tanks (= PzKw 38(t)), 23 Maybach T-III (= StuG III)
- 4th Frontier Guard Brigade

NOVJ:

- 13th Serbian Corps (Ljubo Vuckovic) (estimate based on average number of men per division, 35,000 - 45,000 men)
- 22nd Serbian Division
- 24th Serbian Division
- 46th Serbian Division
- 47th Serbian Division
- 2nd Proletarian Division
- 45th Serbian Division
- Ten local partisan detachments

== See also ==
- Stratsin–Kumanovo operation
- Kosovo operation
- Bregalnitsa–Strumica operation
