= Kiril Stanchev =

Bulgarian general

- Кирил Станчев
- Born: 14 December 1895; Kyustendil, Bulgaria
- Died: 11 April 1968 (aged 72); Sofia, Bulgaria
- Military career
- Allegiance: Bulgaria
- Branch: Bulgarian Army
- Service years: 1916–1946
- Rank: Lieutenant General
- Commands: Platoon and company in the 13th Regiment (1916–1918); 12nd Border Section (1932); 2nd Army (1944–1946)
- Conflicts: First World War; Second World War; Niš operation; Kosovo operation
- Awards: See below

Kiril Nikolov Stanchev (Bulgarian: Кирил Николов Станчев; 14 December 1895 – 11 April 1968) was a Bulgarian general, commander of the Bulgarian Second Army during World War II.

== Biography ==
Kiril Stanchev was born on 14 December 1895 in Kyustendil. He graduated from the Sofia Military School in 1916 with the rank of lieutenant and participated in World War I with the 13th Regiment on the Macedonian front, where he was promoted on 14 October 1917 to Senior Lieutenant. He was further promoted on 30 January 1923 to captain and on 1 January 1933 to major.

After the end of the First World War Kiril Stanchev was variously an active officer, serving in the border troops and in the 22nd Regiment and the 2nd Infantry Division, as well as an instructor in the Bulgarian military academy. He was a member of the Military Union, an influential organization of Bulgarian officers which carried out the 1923 and 1934 coup d'états. He was also a founder of the illegal pro-Republican "Movement of the Captains" within the Military Union. After the Bulgarian King Boris III took de facto supreme power in 1935, Stanchev's participation in this organization along with his role in the 1934 coup led to him being accused of planning an anti-Monarchist coup. He was discharged from the army and sentenced to death. The sentence was commuted to life imprisonment. In 1940 he was pardoned, regained his military rank and on 5 October 1940 promoted to colonel.

From 1941 to 1944 Stanchev studied law in Sofia University. He joined the Fatherland Front, an alliance between several anti-Fascist parties, of which the strongest was the Bulgarian Communist Party He participated in the preparation of the 1944 coup d'état and after the coup, he was part of the Bulgarian delegation that contacted the 3rd Ukrainian Front to arrange a ceasefire with the Soviets.

On 14 September 1944 he was promoted to major general and was given the command of the Bulgarian Second Army. Under his leadership, the 2nd Army participated in the defeat of the German forces in Yugoslavia. He commanded the Bulgarian forces in the Niš and Kosovo operations.

In recognition of his successful command Kiril Stanchev was promoted to lieutenant general on 18 November 1944. However, in 1946, he was arrested and accused of participating in the so-called "Military Union" and plotting a military coup. Modern historians consider the "plot" to have been an invention of the Communist Bulgarian security service, with the intention of getting rid of officers who were not considered sufficiently loyal to the new regime, as well as fabricating a link between the Bulgarian army and the opposition Agrarian party. Stanchev refused to confess either to having participated in an illegal organization or of plotting a coup and he also refused to implicate anyone else. He was still sentenced to life imprisonment, from which was released in 1959. He was rehabilitated in 1960.

Kiril Stanchev died on 11 April 1968 in Sofia.

== Awards ==
- Order of Bravery, III grade, 1st class
- Order of Military Merit, II grade
