= Battle of Bregalnica =

1913 battle of the Second Balkan War

- Part of the Second Balkan War
- Sketch plan of the battle. Left: front on 30 June and Serbian attacks on 1 and 2 July. Right: Attacks of the Serbian 1st Army on 3 and 4 July and of the Serbian 3rd Army on 6–8 July.
Date	30 June – 8 July 1913
Location	Bregalnica, Tsardom of Bulgaria (present-day North Macedonia)
Result	Serbian/Montenegrin victory

Belligerents
Serbia; Montenegro	Bulgaria

Commanders and leaders
(Kingdom of Serbia) Radomir Putnik (Kingdom of Serbia) Petar Bojović (Kingdom of Serbia) Alexander I (Kingdom of Serbia) Živojin Mišić (Kingdom of Montenegro) Janko Vukotić (Kingdom of Montenegro) Krsto Popović	(Tsardom of Bulgaria (1908–1946)) Mihail Savov (Tsardom of Bulgaria (1908–1946)) Stiliyan Kovachev (Tsardom of Bulgaria (1908–1946)) Radko Dimitriev

Strength
(Kingdom of Serbia) 1st Serbian Army - 105,000 men with 145 guns (Kingdom of Serbia) 3rd Serbian Army - 70,000 men with 97 guns (Kingdom of Montenegro) Montenegrin Division - 10,000 men and 6,000 volunteers from the Volunteer Brigade Total; 191,000 people (104 Infantry Battalions, 34 Cavalry Companies, 62 Artillery Batteries)	(Tsardom of Bulgaria (1908–1946)) 4th Bulgarian Army - 116,000 men with 210 guns (Tsardom of Bulgaria (1908–1946)) 5th Bulgarian Army - 68,000 men with 118 guns Total: 184,000 people (100 Infantry Battalions, 6 Cavalry Regiments, 63 Artillery Batteries)

Casualties and losses
Total 16,620; of whom 3,000 killed	Over 20,000 killed or wounded

The Battle of Bregalnica was fought between the armies of the Kingdom of Bulgaria and the Kingdom of Serbia during the Second Balkan War from 30 June to 8 July. It was the largest battle of the war.

== Gallery ==
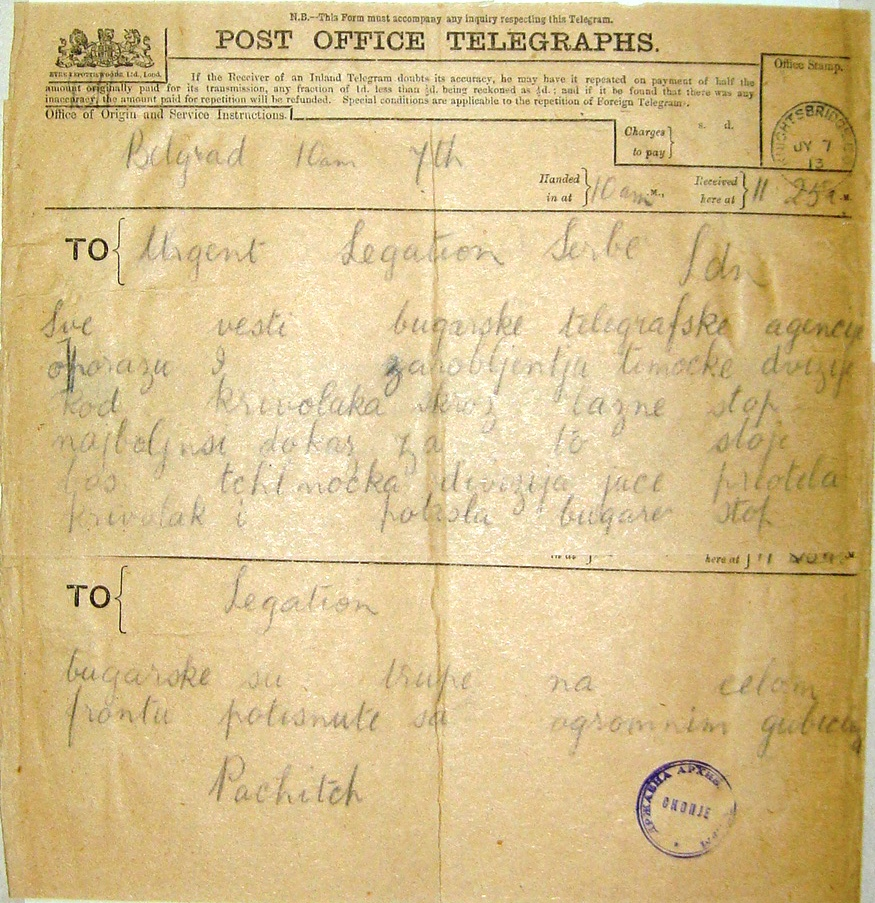
Telegram from Pašić to London, about the success of Timok Division suppressing Bulgarian troops in Krivolak. (June 24, 1913)

== Sources ==
- Savo Skoko Vojvoda Radomir Putnik Vol.1; Beogradsko Grafičko-Izdavčki Zavod, 1984.
- Hall, Richard C. (2000). The Balkan Wars, 1912–1913: Prelude to the First World War. Routledge. ISBN 0-415-22946-4.

== Notes ==
- The numbers of the strength of Serbian Army do not indicate the exact strength of the forces deployed during the Battle of Bregalnica but rather the entire strength of the Serbian Army in Macedonia (the Operational group South, which included the combined 1st and 3rd Armies) at the beginning of hostilities.
