= Fourth Army (Bulgaria) =

Bulgarian field army (1912-1945)

Четвърта армия
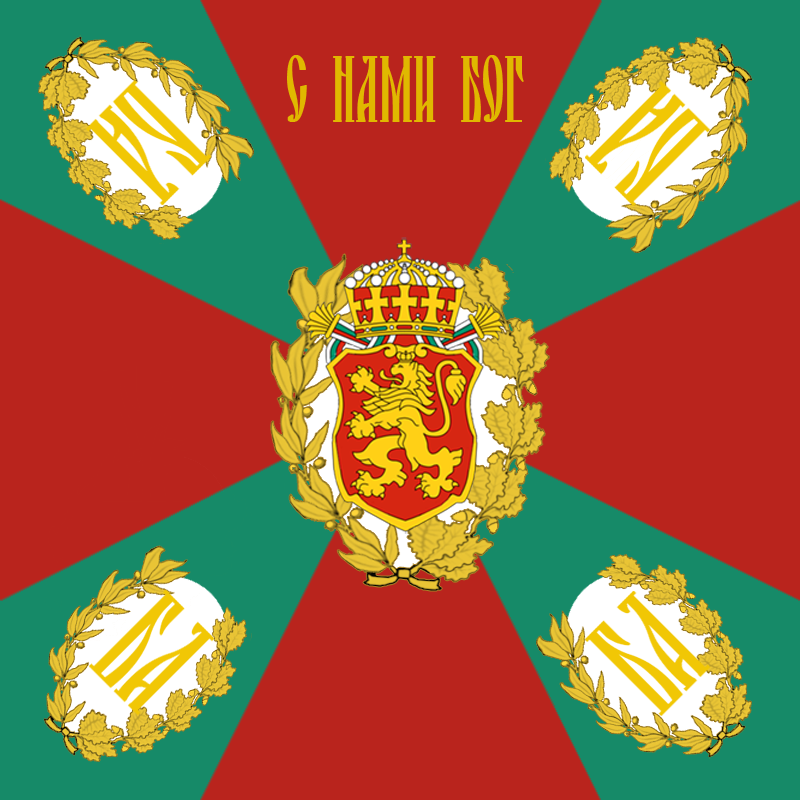
- Active: 1912-1913; 1915-1918; 1941-1945
- Country: Bulgaria
- Allegiance: Bulgarian Army
- Type: Field Army
- Engagements: Balkan Wars: Battle of Bulair; Battle of Bregalnica; Battle of Kalimanci; Battle of Kresna Gorge; World War I: Macedonian front; World War II: Stracin–Kumanovo operation

Commanders
- Notable commanders: Stiliyan Kovachev; Stefan Toshev

The Bulgarian Fourth Army was a Bulgarian field army during the Balkan Wars, World War I, and World War II.

== The Balkan Wars (1912 - 13) ==
=== Balkan War (1912 - 13) ===
In anticipation of the Ottoman Empire counter-offensive, the Bulgarian command on December 14, 1912, formed this army consisting of the following: Second Infantry Thracian Division, Seventh Infantry Rila Division, the Macedonian-Adrian Army and the Third Airborne Division. The commander of the army was General Stiliyan Kovachev. It reflected the Turkish attack on Bulair and the landing at Şarköy in 1913.

=== Second Balkan War (1913) ===
The army focused on the area of Radovish, Shtip, and Kochani against the main force of the Kingdom of Serbia. With the Battle of Bregalnitsa, the war itself begins. In the Battle of Kalimantsi advancing Serbian troops are stopped, preventing them from joining the Greek army. They were heavily suppressed and took heavy losses during the battles.

They were disbanded on 6 August 1913.

== World War I (1915–1918) ==
The Fourth Army was again formed on November 25, 1915. In December of 1917, the Artillery Division of the Army was formed and a military school was established. It was composed of the Tenth Aegean Infantry Division and the Second cavalry division. The Fourth Army was disbanded in October 1918.

During this time, the Fourth Army was commanded by Stefan Toshev.

=== Command and staff ===
- Army Commander - Lieutenant General Mihail Savov (1918) and Infantry General Stefan Toshev (1918)
- Chief of Staff of the Army - from the General Staff, Major General Stefan Azmanov (1918)
- Chief of Artillery - Major General Vladimir Vazov (1918)
- Chief of Engineering Troops - Major General Petko Tzaklev (1918)

==== Divisions ====
- 10th Infantry Division (bg), Western Thrace
- 2nd Cavalry Division (bg) - Major General Ivan Tabakov

== World War II ==
After the outbreak of World War II, the 4th Army was again formed in July 1940.
It was given the task of protecting the southeast border with Turkey as part of the "Covering Front" (Прикриващ фронт) and it was composed of:

- 4th Preslav Infantry Division
- 6th Bdin Infantry Division
- 11th Macedonian Infantry Division.

The 4th Army had tasks assigned to them from 10 February 1941 to December 19, 1943, when they disbanded, but reformed in September 1944, when Bulgaria joined the allies.

On October 15, 1944, the army consisted of 42,494 men and 7,152 horses. From October 15 to November 14, 1944, it fought against the Germans in Vardar Macedonia during the Bregalnitsa-Strumica operation. On December 19, 1944, the army is finally disbanded.

== Commanders ==
No.	Title	Name	Date
1.	Major General	Stiliyan Kovachev	December 24, 1912 - June 28, 1913
2.	Major General	Vicho Dikov	June 28, 1913 - September 2, 1913
3.	Lieutenant General	Stefan Toshev	1917 - 1918
4.	Lieutenant General	Sava Savov	February 1918
5.	Infantry General	Stefan Toshev	1918 - 1919
6.	Major General	Sotir Marinkov	1931
7.	Major General	Ivan Filipov	1933 - 1934
8.	Major General	Mladen Filipov	1934
9.	Colonel	Konstantin Lukash	September 1934 - June 19, 1935
10.	Major General	Hristo Danchev	1935
11.	Major General	Nikola Nedev	1936
12.	Major General	Ivan Markov	1938
13.	Major General	Atanas Stefanov	August 11, 1941 - September 12, 1944, executed by partisans
14.	Major General	Boyan Urumov	September 17, 1944 - November 1, 1944
15.	Major General	Asen Sirakov	November 1, 1944 - December 15, 1944
16.	Major General	Asen Krstev	December 15, 1944 - January 1, 1945 (acting)
17.	Major General	Asen Grekov	January 1, 1945 - August 6, 1946

== See also ==
- First Army
- Second Army
- Third Army
- 11th Macedonian Infantry Division

== Notes ==
- Kamburov, Georgi. Lieutenant General Assen Grekov. Sofia, Military Publishing House, 1988. pp. 116 and 123.

== Sources ==
- Tashev, T., Bulgarian Army 1941 - 1945 - Encyclopedic Reference Book, Sofia, 2008, Military Publishing House EOOD, ISBN 978-954-509-407-1, pp. 368 - 369
- Todorov, T., Eftimov, T. Guide to Archival Funds 1877 - 1944. Vol. 1. Sofia, Military Publishing House, 1976.
- Kamburov, Georgi. Lieutenant General Assen Grekov. Sofia, Military Publishing House, 1988. pp. 116 and 123.
