= Kosovo Operation (1944) =

Military operation during WWII

- Part of World War II in Yugoslavia and World War II in Albania
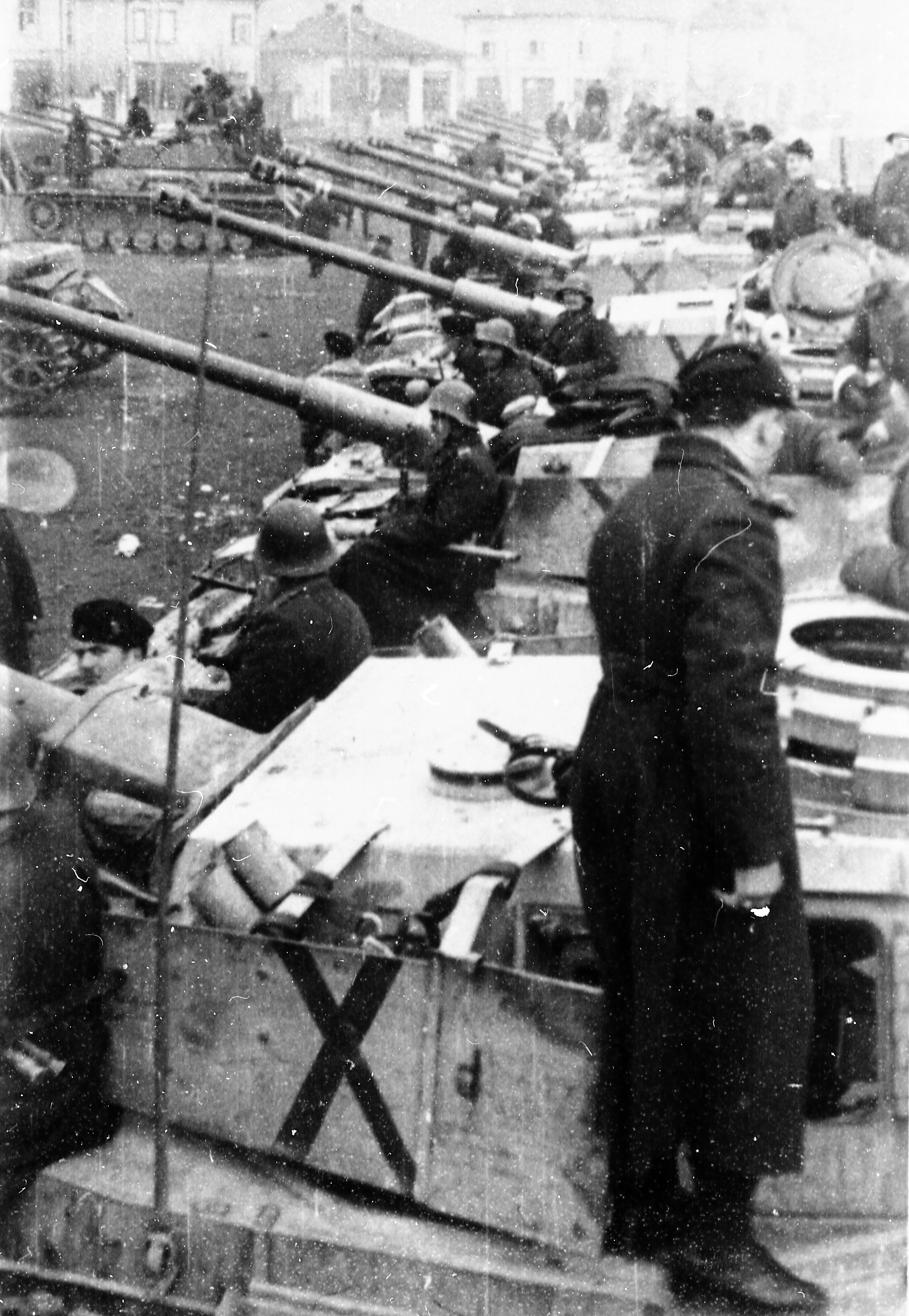
- Bulgarian armored brigade in November 1944 in Podujevë
Date	15 October – 22 November 1944
Location	Kosovo, Kingdom of Albania
Result	Allied victory

Belligerents
Bulgaria; Yugoslav Partisans; Albanian Partisans	Nazi Germany: Albania

Commanders and leaders
Kiril Stanchev; (Yugoslav Partisans) Mile Čalović; (Yugoslav Partisans) Tomica Popović; Enver Hoxha	(Nazi Germany) Alexander Löhr; (Nazi Germany) August Schmidhuber; Midhat Frashëri; (German occupation of Albania) Prenk Pervizi

Units involved
2nd Bulgarian Army; 2nd Division; 4th Division; 6th Division; 9th Division; 12th Division; (Yugoslav Partisans) National Liberation Army; 24th Serbian Division; 46th Serbian Division; 1st Kos-Met Brigade; 2nd Kos-Met Brigade; 3rd Kos-Met Brigade; 4th Kos-Met Brigade; 5th Kos-Met Brigade; National Liberation Movement; 3rd Brigade; 5th Brigade	(Nazi Germany) Army Group E; Kampfgruppe Langer; Kampfgruppe Bredow; Kampfgruppe Skanderbeg; Balli Kombëtar; Vullnetari; Second League of Prizren

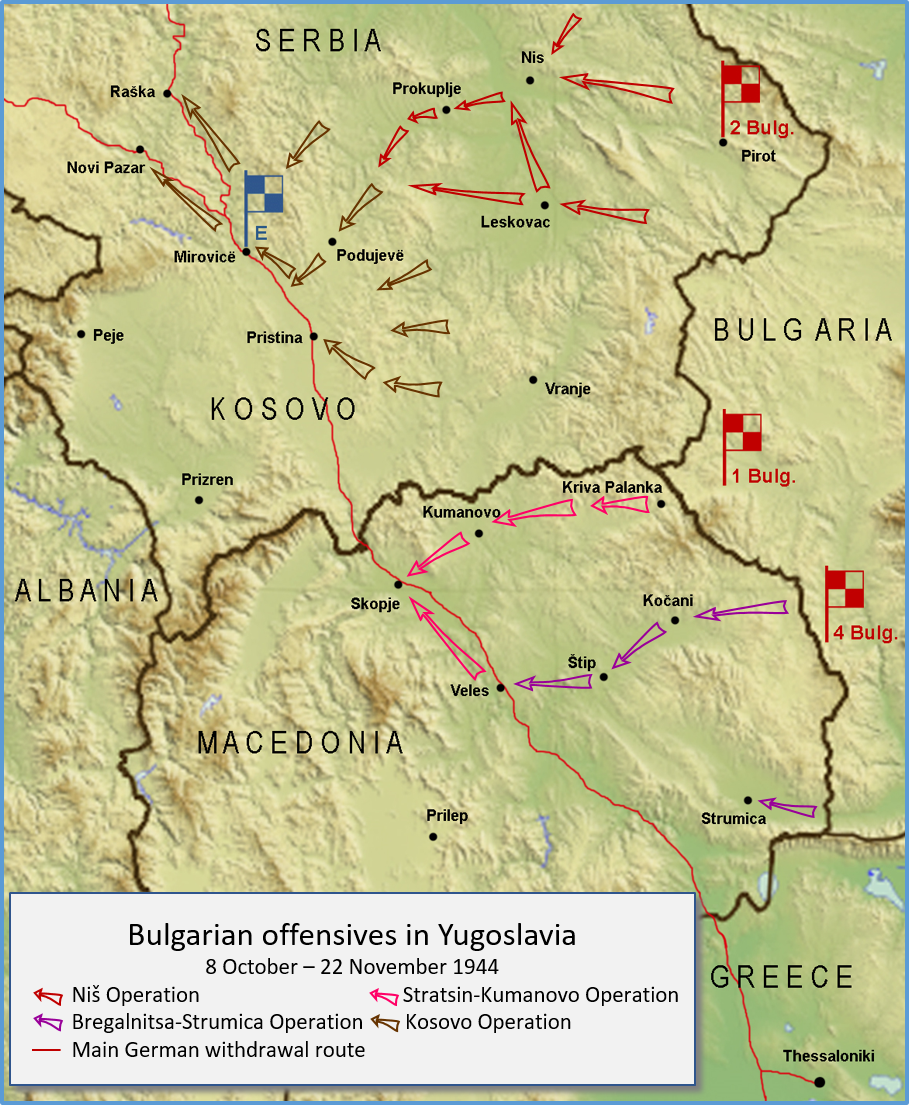
Map of the October–November 1944 Bulgarian offensive in Yugoslavia. Its main task was to cover up the Soviet advance to Belgrade.

The Kosovo Operation was a major strategic military offensive launched between 15 October and 22 November 1944 by the Bulgarian 2nd Army, with the assistance of the Yugoslav Partisans and Albanian Partisans, against German forces and local collaborationist auxiliaries in Kosovo.

Although the Bulgarian army was the main force which drove the Germans out of the area, subsequent Yugoslav historiography has downplayed its role for political reasons. Accounts of these events in post-war Yugoslav literature give the impression that the Germans were driven out by the communist Partisans who liberated the area. There was some fighting by the Yugoslav Partisans, but their actions were insignificant compared with Bulgarian military activity.

== Background ==
=== German and Collaborator Defenses ===
Despite the inevitable defeat, German Army Group E, retreating from Greece and North Macedonia, considered the Kosovo communication line (specifically the Kosovska Mitrovica – Skopje route) vital for the withdrawal of its troops toward Bosnia. To secure this corridor, the Germans mobilized approximately 30,000 Albanian collaborators (Balli Kombëtar), who were deployed to hold positions against the advancing 24th and 46th Serbian Divisions of the NOVJ and the Bulgarian forces. The German command also relied on the "Langer" and "Bredov" combat groups to protect the flanks of the retreating columns.

=== Yugoslav-Bulgarian Coordination ===
A crucial element of the operation was the new strategic alliance between the NOVJ and the Bulgarian Army. Following the political changes in Bulgaria and the formation of the Fatherland Front government, Bulgaria sought to contribute to the war against Germany to redeem its national standing.

In a meeting in Craiova between Marshal Josip Broz Tito and Bulgarian representatives, an agreement was reached for joint operations. The new Bulgarian Second Army was welcomed as a fraternal fighting force. Acting under the operational command of the 3rd Ukrainian Front of the Red Army and in close coordination with the Supreme Headquarters of the NOVJ, the Bulgarian forces were tasked to push into Kosovo with the Yugoslavs. This cooperation symbolized the new anti-fascist unity in the Balkans, with Yugoslav and Bulgarian units fighting shoulder-to-shoulder to cut off the German retreat.

== Operation ==
The main forces involved in this undertaking were Bulgarian 2nd Army supported by the Yugoslav 24th and 46th Divisions as well as the 1st through 5th "Kosovo-Metohija" Brigades and the Albanian 3rd and 5th Brigades of the People's Liberation Army of Albania. These forces were assisted by air sorties of the Western Allies and the Soviets against units of Generaloberst Alexander Löhr's Army Group "E" as the latter retreated from Greece. The Axis order of battle against the Bulgarians and Yugoslavs in this operation comprised some 17,000 men including the Kampfgruppe "Langer" with three infantry companies, one artillery battery and one platoon of tanks, Kampfgruppe "Bredow" with six infantry battalions, three artillery battalions and 10 tanks), Kampfgruppe "Skanderbeg" with about 7,000 men of Waffen-SS August Schmidhuber's 21st Mountain Division "Skanderbeg" and about 4,000 German navy personnel making their way to the north from Greece.

The Germans were supported by some 10,000 men of the Balli Kombëtar (National Front), the Albanian nationalist, anti-communist and anti-monarchist organisation. The Albanian nationalist forces and the 21st Waffen Mountain Division SS "Skanderbeg" served as the rearguard for the Wehrmacht's retreat, helping the Germans successfully withdraw large forces from Greece and Albania. The SS Skanderbeg was extensively utilised by the Germans, advancing into the mountains and engaging Partisan troops on a daily basis, to cover the flanks of the Wehrmacht. As the offensive against the Germans drove into full swing the SS "Skanderbeg" was issued with orders to increase repression of the Partisan forces and any sympathisers. In keeping with these orders, 131 NLM (Albanian Partisan) prisoners were shot or hanged in Kosovo by members of the division by 23 October.

== Aftermath ==
Freeing the Kosovo region from the Germans did not bring immediate peace and order. After the Germans had been driven out, Tito ordered the collection of weapons in Kosovo and the arrest of prominent Albanians. The order was not well received and, combined with passions felt about Kosovo, inflamed an insurrection. On 2 December 1944, anti-communist Albanians from the Drenica region attacked the Trepca mining complex and other targets. Numbering at most 2,000 men, these anti-communists managed to hold off a Partisan force of 30,000 troops for two months. Now "an armed uprising of massive proportions" broke out in Kosovo led by the Balli Kombëtar (which still had around 9,000 men under arms at the time), which aimed to resist incorporation of Kosovo into communist Yugoslavia. It was only in July 1945 that the Yugoslav Partisans were able to put down the uprising and establish their control over Kosovo.

== See also ==
- Stratsin-Kumanovo operation
- Bregalnitsa-Strumica operation
- Niš operation

== Sources ==
- Motadel, David (2014). Islam and Nazi Germany's War. Cambridge, Massachusetts: Harvard University Press. ISBN 978-0-674-72460-0.
- Biddiscombe, Alexander (2006). The SS Hunter Battalions: The Hidden History of the Nazi Resistance Movement 1944–45. Tempus. ISBN 9780752439389.
- Fischer, Bernd Jürgen (1999). Albania at War, 1939–1945. C. Hurst & Co. Publishers. ISBN 978-1-85065-531-2.
