= Second Army (Bulgaria) =

Втора армия Second Army
- Active: 1912–1913; 1915–1918; 1941–1945
- Country: Kingdom of Bulgaria
- Allegiance: Bulgarian Army
- Type: Field Army
- Engagements: Balkan Wars: Battle of Adrianople; Battle of Kilkis-Lahanas; Battle of Kresna Gorge; World War I: Serbian Campaign; Macedonian front; World War II: Niš operation; Kosovo operation

Commanders
- Notable commanders: Nikola Ivanov; Georgi Todorov; Kiril Stanchev

The Bulgarian Second Army was a Bulgarian field army during the Balkan Wars, World War I, and World War II.

== History ==
After 1907, during times of peace, the territory of Bulgaria was divided in three army inspectorates, each one comprising three divisional district. During war they formed three independent field armies. The Second Army Inspectorate, which had its seat in Plovdiv, formed the headquarters of the Second Army.

=== Balkan Wars ===
==== First Balkan War ====
On 17 September Bulgaria declared the mobilization of its armed forces and the three field armies were activated. Lieutenant General Nikola Ivanov took command of the Second Army and colonel Nikola Zhekov was made chief of staff.

The Second Army was tasked with covering the concentration of the remaining forces. Its own mobilization and deployment were carried out according to schedule and on 30 September almost all units had reached their designated areas along the Ottoman border. The Army established its headquarters at Simeonovgrad. Then on 5 October 1912 O.S. Bulgaria declared war on the Ottoman Empire. The Second Army had the following order of battle:

Second Army Order of Battle
	Battalions	Squadrons	Artillery Batteries	Men	Rifles	Machine guns	Cannons
Army Staff and Services				1,327	249		
8th "Tundzha" Infantry Division	25	2	15	35,473	26,908	24	72
9th "Pleven" Infantry Division	25		15	34,690	24,019	24	72
Haskovo Detachment	8	1	9	11,867	8,302	8	42
Mixed Cavalry Brigade		6		1,551	1,031	4	
2nd QF Howitzer Section			3				12
Total	58	9	42	83,357	60,059	60	198

The task of the army was to neutralize the strong garrison of the Adrianople fortress while the First and Third armies engaged the main forces of the Ottoman Eastern Army. After the advance had begun, in order to achieve its objective, the Second Army was temporarily reinforced with the 1st Brigade of the 3rd Balkan Infantry Division (9236 men, c.8,300 rifles and 8 machine guns), which was attached to the 9th Division.

Initially, the army met little resistance and its main forces (8th and 9th divisions) headed towards Adrianople. The Haskovo Detachment engaged the Ottoman forces of Yaver Pasha around Kurdzhali and after a decisive battle took the town on 8 October. This secured the right flank of the army and made any Ottoman attacks on its rear lines of communication impossible.

On 9 October, the Ottoman Army in Eastern Thrace commenced an offensive against the Bulgarian forces. The fortress garrison left the town and attacked to the west and the east against the Bulgarian Second and First armies. The Bulgarians were not surprised and managed to hold the attacks, forcing the Ottomans to return to the fortress. On 10 October, with the end of the attempted breakthrough the Bulgarian High Command ordered the 1/3 Brigade to be returned to the 3rd Balkan Infantry Division. The Haskovo Detachment was ordered to leave two battalions in Kardzhali and approach Adrianople from the west.

After the victory at the Battle of Kirk Kilisse the Bulgarian First and Third armies advanced to the south in pursuit of the Ottoman Eastern Army and cut the line of communication between Adrianople and Constantinople. The 3rd Balkan Division was ordered by the commander of the First Army to remain around Adrianople, to protect the army's rear and cooperate with the Second Army. With the fortress now almost completely isolated, its commander Shukru Pasha ordered a new attack on 16 October with 18 infantry battalions against the Bulgarian 3/8, 1/9 and 2/9 infantry brigades but it soon failed and the Turkish troops retired to their main defensive line. On the same day with their main forces engaged at the Lule Burgas the Bulgarians decided to complete the encirclement of the fortress. Two brigades of the 9th Division were sent to assist the Third Army while their place was taken by the newly formed 11th Mixed Infantry Division. By 26 October the fortress was completely cut off but the Bulgarian lines were overstretched and in held by very few troops on many places. The Bulgarian High Command used a previously reached agreement with Serbia, that allowed the deployment of Serbian forces in Eastern Thrace, to reinforce the Bulgarians with two divisions of the Serbian Second Army. By early November the last of the Serbian forces had arrived. With the attention of the Bulgarians focused on the Çatalca line a new attempt by the Ottomans to break the siege was repulsed on 29 and 30 October. Until the first armistice was concluded the Second Army limited its operations to tightening the encirclement and shelling the fortress in order to reduce the morale of its defenders.

During the first armistice, while the peace talks in London continued, the Bulgarians strengthened and fortified their positions around the fortress. As soon as it became evident that the Ottomans were not willing to satisfy the demands of the Balkan League, the Bulgarian High Command began preparing for a possible renewal of the military operations and drawing plans for the capture of the Adrianople Fortress.

In January 1913 the talks finally broke down and hostilities recommenced. On 26 January the Ottomans began a large offensive against Bulair and on the Çatalca line in order to break through the Bulgarian armies and relieve the forces in Adrianople. To use this development on the next day Shukru Pasha again ordered his forces to break out the besieged fortress but once again the attack failed. The Ottomans offensive as a whole had little success and failed to achieve its objectives. The Bulgarian High Command decided to storm the fortress in order to prevent any more large attempts for its rescue and to free the Bulgarian forces besieging it for operations elsewhere. By March the Second Army was reinforced and ready to attack. Its battle area was divided in sectors that had the following order of battle:

Second Army Order of Battle on 11 March 1913
	Battalions	Squadrons	Artillery batteries	Men	Rifles	Machine guns	Cannons
Army Headquarters				2,356			
Eastern Sector	50	9,5	53		41,927	50	226
Southern Sector	17		23		16,278	16	94
Western and Northwestern sector	4		8		3,116		38
Total	71	9,5	84	107,249	61,321	66	358

The Serbian Second Army(28 battalions, 18 batteries, 46,450 men; 22,433 rifles, 28 machine guns and 70 cannons) was deployed in the Western and Northwestern sector.

The final assault began on 11 March with the forces in the Eastern Sector tasked with the main attack. After three days of heavy fighting the fortress fell and Sukru Pasha surrendered to generals Nikola Ivanov and Georgi Vazov. The Ottoman Empire was left with no choice, asked and received a second armistice on 3 April. This marked the end of the Bulgarian military operations in the war.

==== Second Balkan War ====
With the end of the First Balkan War, Bulgaria was forced to start transferring its forces immediately to Macedonia and the old border with Serbia. The Second Army was deployed in Aegean Macedonia against the entire Greek Army. Its composition had changed significantly and now included two half-strength divisions and three infantry brigades, two of which had been recently raised from young untrained and inexperienced men from the territories ceded by the Ottoman Empire. On 16 June, the army had the following order of battle:

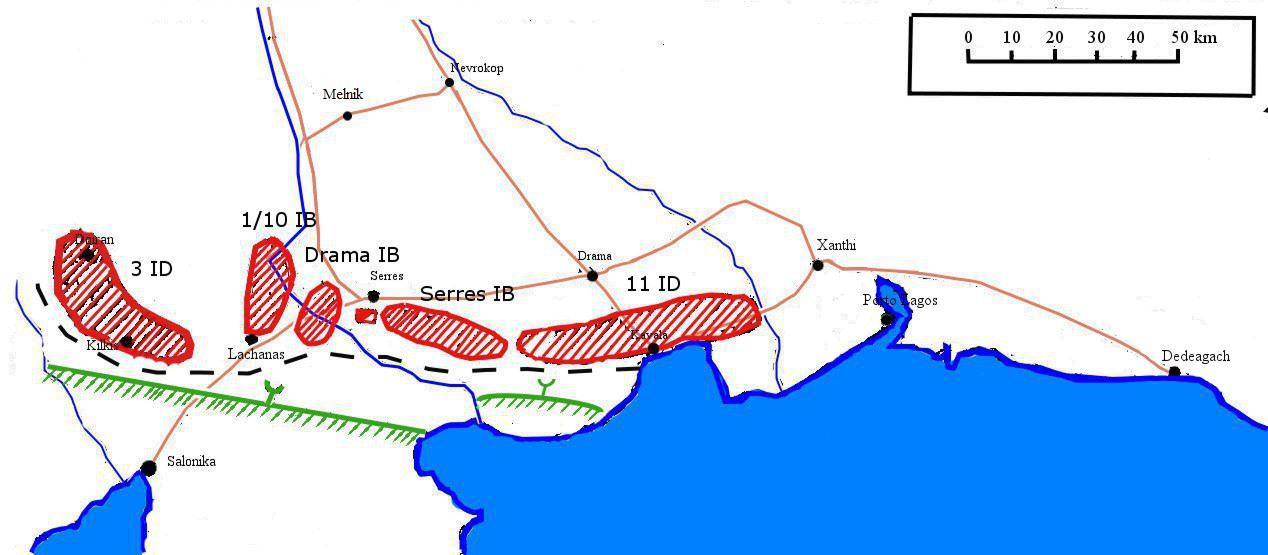
The Second Army on 16 June 1913

Second Army Order of Battle
	Battalions	Squadrons	Artillery Batteries	Men	Rifles	Cannons
Army Staff				713		
3rd "Balkan" Infantry Division	16		12	22,615	19,059	69
11th "Mixed" Infantry Division	11		6	24,399	20,110	68
1/10 Infantry Brigade	8		3	10,430	8,100	12
Drama Brigade	8		4	8,336	6,820	8
Seres Brigade	8		4	8,583	6,945	18
Army units	6	10	8			
Total	57	10	37	75,076	61,034	175

On 17 June, following the attack of the Bulgarian Fourth Army against the Serbians, the Second Army began advancing against the Greek forces. The 11th Division and the Serres Brigade drove off the Greek troops around Pravishte with ease, as the main Greek forces had retired to the right bank of the Struma a few days earlier. In the center of the line the 1/10 Brigade and the 2/3 Brigade also advanced and began fortifying their positions around Kukush and Negovan. Meanwhile, the 3/3 Brigade attacked the weak Serbian vanguards west of Lake Dojran and captured Gevgelija. The Army remained dispersed on a 96-kilometer-long front which severely hampered the coordination and cooperation between its forces, leaving general Ivanov with no reserves.

During the initial Bulgarian advance, the Greek Army had not finished its concentration but once the direction of the advance was clear and it became evident that the Bulgarian Fourth Army was seriously engaged in the struggle with the Serbians the Greek Headquarters decided to go on the offensive. For that purpose, the Greeks had 8 infantry divisions and a cavalry brigade, almost their entire army. On 19 June, they advanced with two divisions (6 regiments) on a wide front against Kukush where the Bulgarian 2nd Infantry Brigade of the 3rd Division (two regiments) had fortified its positions. The fighting was heavy but the Bulgarians managed to hold the advance temporarily which convinced the Greek Headquarters to throw even more forces in the fight and outflank the Bulgarians. By 21 June the 2/3 Brigade could not cope with the crushing numerical superiority of its opponents and the arriving reinforcements from the Serres Brigade failed to avert the defeat. This forced the Bulgarians to retreat. The situation in the other sectors of the Second Army also deteriorated rapidly. Parts of the 3/3 Brigade were defeated at Kalinovo by the Greek 10th division and the 1/10 Brigade, supported by parts of the Drama Brigade, was defeated at Lachanas by the Greek 1st and 6th divisions. After the defeat at the Battle of Kilkis-Lahanas the Bulgarians retired to the north. On the right wing of the Second Army the 3/3 Infantry Brigade had dug in south of Dojran in an attempt to hold the Greek 10th Division. The Bulgarian Command order the 2/6 Infantry Brigade to reinforce the positions but the Greeks pressed two more divisions in the fight and once again compelled the Bulgarians to retreat on 23 June.

The Second Army was now given the task to protect the Dojran-Strumitsa road and the Rupel Gorge that were vital for the rear of the Bulgarian 4th Army. For that purpose the army was divided in two – the 3/3 and 2/6 infantry brigades under the commander of the 6th Bdin Division were to defend the first direction and the Serres, Drama, 2/3 and 1/10 brigades under the commander of the 3rd Division were to guard the Gorge. The 11th Infantry Division was left to guard the Aegean coast between the Struma and the Mesta. The Greek Army divided its forces accordingly one group consisting of the 2nd, 3rd, 4th, 5th, 10th divisions and the cavalry brigade operating against Strumitsa and another one consisting of the 1st, 6th and 7th divisions tasked with demonstrative actions in the Rupel Gorge. The numerical superiority of the Greeks and their artillery proved decisive and on 26 June they took Strumitsa outflanking the Bulgarians at Ruppel and forcing their retreat. The Second Army, however, prevented a disaster by managing to hold its positions long enough for the 4th Army to conduct its own retreat.

The Serbians and the Greeks now established direct contact with each other and planned a joint offensive, hoping to link up at Tsarevo Selo and destroy the Bulgarian 4th and 2nd armies. The Serbians were to attack at Kalimantsi while the main forces of the Greek Army – 1st, 2nd, 4th, 5th and 6th Division – was to advance against Gorna Dzhumaia with the remaining divisions covering their flanks.

The Bulgarian Second Army was in no condition to hold the Greek advance as it had suffered heavy casualties in the previous battles and a cholera outbreak further reduced its strength. In addition, the news of the Romanian and Ottoman mobilization reduced the morale of the soldiers. Under such conditions by 11 July the Greek forces had managed to advance up to the northern exit of the Kresna Gorge but the decisive victory they had planned was not achieved as the Serbians were defeated at the Battle of Kalimanci and the Greek forces themselves had overextended their supply lines. The Bulgarian Second Army managed to conduct a fighting retreat, reaching height 1378. On 15 July that positioned was abandoned and the forces retired north Gorna Dzhumaia where the front finally stabilized.

The Bulgarian High Command now planned to go on the offensive against the Greeks for the first time since the beginning of the war. The Bulgarian 4th and 5th armies had been placed under the overall command of general Mihail Savov and on 14 July the Second Army was also added to the army group. the defeat of the Serbians allowed the Bulgarians to concentrate large parts of the 4th Army, the entire 2nd Army and fresh units of the 1st Army against the Greek Army. General Savov could count on 110 battalions, 10 squadrons and 40 artillery batteries against the 84 battalions 12 squadrons and 37 artillery batteries of the Greeks. The plan was to pin down the Serbian armies in front of the Bulgarian 4th Army while the main Bulgarian forces attacked the flanks of the Greek Army in an effort to completely encircle it.

The operation began on 15 July with successful Bulgarian advances on both flanks and in the center. General Vasil Kutinchev, who replaced general Ivanov as commander of the 2nd Army on 16 July, used the situation to retake height 1378 in the center of the front and exerting pressure on the Greeks who were transferring part of their forces from the center in order to strengthen their flanks. The greatest threat for the Bulgarians however came from the Greek 2nd and 4th divisions which attacked between 15 and 17 July the right wing of the Second Army in an effort to utilize a gap that had opened between it and the 4th Army and eventually join hands with the Serbians at Tsarevo Selo. The Greek advance, however, was halted and the reorganized right wing of the Second Army continued its attacks against the left wing of the Greeks in the Kresna Gorge. The Serbians also tried to assist but their attacks were repulsed by the 7th Rila Division of the Bulgarian 4th Army.

King Constantine realized that his army was placed in a very difficult situation and his so far uncompromising attitude towards Bulgarian offers for a ceasefire gave way to a more yielding attitude. He admitted that his forces were reaching the limits of their morale physical endurance and asked his prime minister Eleftherios Venizelos to reach a ceasefire agreement as soon as possible.

By 17 July, the Bulgarians had achieved success with their right flank advancing with between 15 and 18 kilometers in three days and the Greeks heavily engaged in the center and on their right flank. The advance was to continue on 18 July but the Greek king managed to obtained the ceasefire he and the Bulgarian delegation in Bucharest desired before any further military actions were undertaken.

The army was demobilized on 29 July, one day after the signing of the Treaty of Bucharest.

=== First World War ===
Only two years after the end of the Second Balkan War Bulgaria entered World War I on the side of the Central Powers. The Bulgarian Army began mobilizing on 9 September(23 September) 1915 and the three field armies were once again activated.

==== Serbian Campaign ====
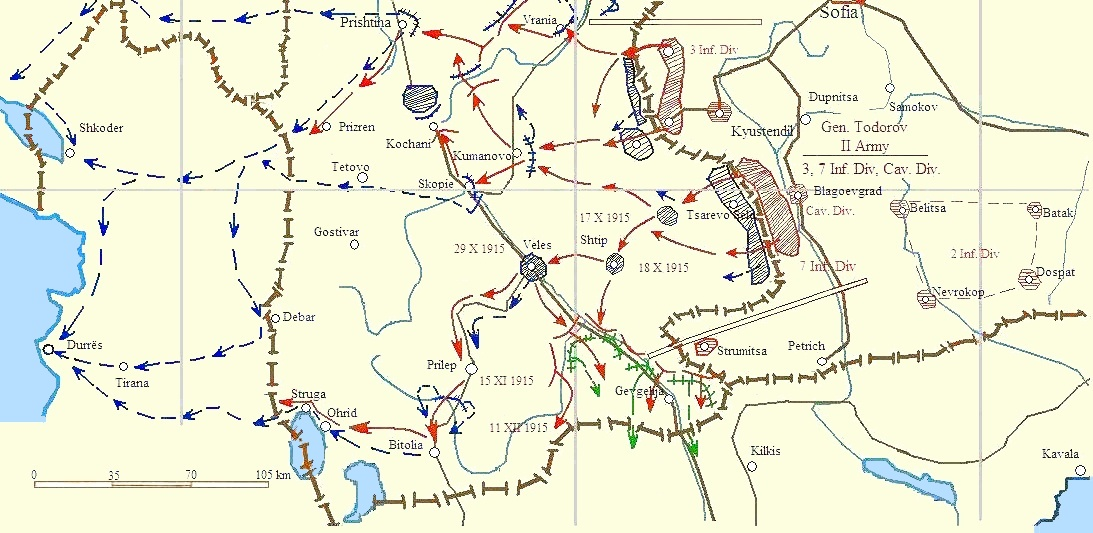
The operations of the Second Army in 1915

On 24 August(6 September) 1915 at the German military headquarters in Pleß Bulgaria and Germany signed a treaty of alliance and a military convention that laid the plan for the conquest of Serbia and included Austria-Hungary as a third party.

In accordance with the said agreements Bulgaria concentrated against Serbia its First Army, as part of Army Group Mackensen and its Second Army which remained under the direct control of the Bulgarian High Command.

The Second Army under Lieutenant General Todorov finished its concentration in the Kyustendil – Dupnitsa – Blagoevgrad area by 30 September. Its order of battle was as follows:

Second Army Order of Battle
	Battalions	Squadrons	Artillery Batteries	Men	Rifles	Machine Guns	Cannons
Army Staff				2,209	554		
3rd "Balkan" Infantry Division	23	1	15	40,922	20,833	24	60
7th Rila Infantry Division	20	1	27	41,321	22,259	20	114
Cavalry Division		16	2	4,258	2,826		8
Border Guards	3			2,705	2,205		
Opalchenie Regiments	4			2,487	2,169		
Etappe Regiments	8			4,713	2,129		
Army Supply Services				882	120		
Total	58	18	44	99,497	53,145	52	182

The Serbians could oppose these forces with their Macedonian forces under general Damian Popovic. The total strength was 44 battalions with 16 batteries or in other words some 41,250 riflemen, 78 cannons and 38 machine guns. By 30 September however only 31 battalions with 11 batteries or 29,600 riflemen, 54 cannons and 24 machine guns were on the border with Bulgaria, the rest were guarding the border with Albania. The Serbians adopted a passive defense approach, hoping that their insufficient forces will hold out long enough for the Entente to reinforce them with the troops that were already landing in Salonika.

The objectives of the Bulgarian Second Army were to cut the communication and supply lines between Macedonia and Serbia, to prevent a retreat of the main Serbian forces to Macedonia and to repel any Entente attempts to reinforce the Serbians from the south.

On 1 October (14 October) 1915 Bulgaria declared war on Serbia and the Second Army was ordered to begin its attack drive towardsOvche Pole. The weak Serbian force were quickly defeated and forced to retreat from the border area with the Bulgarian forces taking Tsarevo Selo and Kriva Palanka followed on 16 October by the entry of the 2/3 Infantry Brigade in Vranje. On 6 October (20 October) the Bulgarian 3rd Division overwhelmed the Serbian positions at Stracin which allowed it to seize Kumanovo. This practically isolated Serbia from Macedonia and cut the communication and supply lines with Salonika. On 9 October after a brief fight the Bulgarians took Skopje. At the same time in the fighting near Krivolak and Strumitsa for the first time, French forces of the 156th division aided their Serbian allies by gradually replacing and allowing them to be transferred further to the west.

On 10 October concerned by the Serbian and Entente efforts to join their forces in Macedonia from the North and the South, the Bulgarian High Command divided the Second Army in two operational groups. The Northern Group was to operate along the valley of the river Morava and in the direction of the Kosovo plain while the Southern Group had to advance along the Vardar against the French and British. The army was deemed too weak for these tasks and had to be reinforced by the 11th Macedonian Infantry Division, the 5th Danube Infantry Division that joined it by the middle of October and latter with the 2nd Thracian Infantry Division. This allowed the Northern Group to repel several Serbian attacks against Gnjilane and Kačanik in the south the Bulgarians waited for reinforcements and fought several battles with the French around Krivolak and the British south of Strumitsa.

With the fall of Niš to the north the first phase of the campaign against Serbia ended and the second and last began. The Central Powers decided to attempt an encirclement of the Serbian Army at the Kosovo Pole. The Second Army was to take part with its Northern Operations Group while it remained on the defensive in the south. The operation lasted for several weeks and on 10 November (23 November) Pristina fell. The attempted encirclement however failed and part of the Serbian Army managed to withdraw through Albania to the Adriatic coast due to the slow advance from the north which allowed them to concentrate bigger forces against the Bulgarian Second Army and considerably reduce its speed. The Central Powers were content only with pursuing them with parts of the Second Army and the Austro-Hungarian 3rd Army. On 17 November Prizren was taken but all contact between the Bulgarian and Serbian forces was lost. Gradually the rest of western Macedonia was occupied and by December the Bulgarians entered Monastri where the Serbian Campaign ended.

After the fall of Pristina and Prizren the Bulgarian High Command again turned its attention to the south and began transferring reinforcements for operations against the Entente forces that had grown to as much as 130,000 men. General Maurice Sarrail realized that the defeat of the Serbian Army made his positions untenable in the face of the whole Bulgarian First and Second armies and began to withdraw parts of his army. By December the Bulgarian Second Army undertook a major offensive against the retreating allies and after several engagements with the French and British 10th (Irish) Division at Kosturino reached the Greek border. At this point Vardar Macedonia was completely cleared of Entente presence but the Second Army several times received warnings from the Bulgarian High Command that any crossing of the Greek border was absolutely forbidden. This allowed the Allies to safely retreat to Salonika.

For the entire campaign in 1915 the casualties suffered by the Second Bulgarian Army were 4,084 killed, 17,642 wounded, 999 dead from disease and 1,888 missing or a total of around 24,613.

==== Macedonian front ====
In early 1916 the Bulgarians and Germans agree to postpone any plans for an attack of Salonika and dig in along the border with Greece. The Entente used the time to reinforce and entrench around the town. Once it became evident that the Bulgarians were not going to advance the Allied forces themselves began moving up to the Greek border and by the end of May contact between the opposing forces was reestablished.

The Bulgarian Second Army which took up position along the Belasitsa range now consisted of the 7th Rila, 11th Macedonian Infantry Division and the 3/2 Infantry Brigade. The 5th Danube and the rest of the 2nd Thracian Infantry Division had been assigned to the German Eleventh Army. Contact with the Allies in this part of the front was also reestablished. The Bulgarian High Command realized that if the Entente occupied the Southern exit of the Ruppel Pass and took the fortress there, the Second Army would not be able to advance south along the Struma and the threat of an Allied attempt to penetrate into Bulgaria itself would grow significantly. With this in mind, the 7th Rila Division was ordered to forestall these events by occupying Ruppel fortress first. On 26 May the Bulgarian forces crossed the border, meeting no opposition from the Greek border guards. By the next day the 7th Division was in complete control of the entire Ruppel Pass and now controlled all avenues of approach from Demirhisar to the valley of the Struma. As soon as the operation was over the Bulgarians began fortifying their new positions.

The Bulgarian forces however still remained scattered and had to cover a front of almost 600 kilometers. On a line between Albania and Lake Dojran the Central Powers had arrayed the Bulgarian First Army and the German Eleventh Army (which consisted mostly of Bulgarian formations) under Army Group Mackensen. From there to the delta of the Maritsa the front was guarded by the Bulgarian Second Army and the independent 10th Aegean Infantry Division. The Bulgarian High Command realized the difficulties involved in holding such a long front and planned measures to improve the situation. The expected entry of Romania in the war on the side of the Entente provided an additional incentive and an eventual German blessing for a Bulgarian offensive on the Macedonian front.

The plan was to strike on both Allied flanks in order to cut their communication lines with the Italians in Albania and seize the Drama – Giumurdzhina railway. The second objective was given to the Bulgarian Second Army and the 10th Aegean Division. For the operation general Todorov could rely on 58 battalions, 116 machine guns, 57 artillery batteries and 5 cavalry squadrons in his army and an additional 25 battalions, 24 machine guns, 31 batteries and 5 squadrons in the 10th Division.

The Struma Offensive began on 18 August with the 7th Rila, 11th Macedonian Division and the 3/2 Infantry Brigade and 10th Division advancing on a 230-kilometer-long front. For 6 days the Bulgarian forces achieved all their objectives in the face of weak Greek and French resistance. The depth of the advance reached 80–90 kilometers and an area of 4,000 square kilometers was occupied. Most importantly, however, the Macedonian front was shortened with 100–120 kilometers and the Greek IV Army Corps, that was positioned in the area, was disbanded, its troops and armament interned by the Germans in Silesia.

On the right Bulgarian flank, however, the advance of the Bulgarian First Army soon stalled and was called off. The Entente now planned an offensive against it in order to support the hard pressed Romanians and knock out Bulgaria out of the war. While the main blow was directed against the First Army the British were tasked with secondary operations against the Bulgarian second Army that were designed to pin down as many Bulgarian troops as possible.

In the middle of September, as the situation of the Bulgarian First Army deteriorated, the commander of the Bulgarian Second Army general Todorov ordered the 7th Rila Division to take positions for an attack over the Struma river, in order to assist the hard pressed Bulgarians and Germans west of the Vardar. The Bulgarian high command, however, refused to give permission for the attack. This hesitation allowed the British to consolidated their positions on the left bank of the Struma around the village of Karacaköy on 30 September. On 3 October the 10th (Irish) Division attacked the Bulgarian positions in the village of Yenikoy that were defended by the 13th Rila Regiment of the 7th Division. The battle lasted for the entire day and the Bulgarians reinforced by the 14th Macedonian Regiment and 17th Artillery Regiment twice retook the village after a fierce bayonet struggle. During the night, after a third and last attack, the village was occupied by the Irish division. Casualties on both sides were heavy due to the accurate artillery and machine gun fire. After the battle the Bulgarian 13th Regiment was reorganized to a three battalion strength instead of the usual four battalions. After 4 October the Bulgarians set up positions on the nearby heights to the east while the right flank of the 7th Rila division remained in the valley to protect the Rupel Pass. In the middle of October and the beginning of November, the Bulgarians were reinforced by two Ottoman divisions which freed some troops that could now be sent to assist in the fighting against the Allies west of the Vardar. From this point onwards no large operations were conducted on the Struma front until the end of the offensive.

For much of 1917 the Struma front was passive as the main Entente efforts were directed against the Eleventh and First armies. In addition, any operations were hampered by the often too cold or too hot weather and the spread of malaria. The only more significant change was that the commander of the Second Army, general Georgi Todorov, was replaced by general Ivan Lukov in February 1917.

By 1918 the Bulgarian Army was suffering from chronic shortages of food, ammunition and low morale. Desertion, including in the Second army, became more frequent. The Entente was well aware of the crisis in the Bulgarian Army and planned to break the Macedonian front with a large offensive again directed against the Eleventh and First armies. On 14 September the Serbians and French attacked at Dobro Pole and achieved a breakthrough. Two days later the British and Greek attacked the Bulgarian First Army at Doiran but suffered a heavy defeat. The commander of the First Army general Stefan Nerezov proposed a counterattack with his forces and the Second Bulgarian Army but after some hesitation was refused permission. So for much of the Entente offensive the Second Army, with its 48 battalions, 251 cannons and 462 machine guns, limited itself with sending small reinforcements to the First Army. Nonetheless, the army continued to hold the Struma line and foiled a Greek attempt to capture Serres, gaining a few cannons as trophies. The overall situation however forced the Bulgarian government ask the Entente for an armistice and general Ivan Lukov was dispatched to Salonika for the negotiations with general Franchet d'Esperey. The talks reached a successful conclusion and the armistice was signed on 29 September 1918. This marked the end of Bulgarian participation the Great War.

The Second Army pulled back to the interior of the country and was demobilized on 16 October.

== Second World War ==
=== World War II for the Axis ===
Throughout 1940 and 1941, the Kingdom of Bulgaria, under Tsar Boris III, allied itself with Adolf Hitler's Germany, entered the regained Southern Dobrudja, and captured Thrace, and much of Macedonia in the process. In the Bulgarian Army, there were five field armies and some 30 divisions.

In the summer 1941 the Second Army with the 10th Rodopi Division and the 2nd Border Brigade occupied Western Thrace and parts of Aegean Macedonia. The army set up its headquarters at Xanthi. The defence of the Aegean coast however required more specific measures and by the end of the year the Second Army and its units moved to the old border of Bulgaria and were replaced by a special Belomorski (Aegean) Detachment and the 11th division of the First Army.

=== World War II for the Allies ===
In early September 1944, the rapidly advancing Red Army reached the northern border of Bulgaria. In an attempt to prevent the entry of the Red Army in the country on 26 August, the government of Ivan Bagryanov declared Bulgarian neutrality in the German-Soviet war. This measure was not enough and soon his government fell and on 5 September the USSR declared war on the country. Three days later the new government of Konstantin Muraviev declared war on Germany in vain as the Red Army entered the country and soon the prime minister was overthrown and replaced with the Fatherland Front's government which immediately concluded a ceasefire with the Soviets and prepared the Bulgarian Army for operations against the forces of Germany.

The German Army Group E began its withdrawal from Greece to Yugoslavia with its 350,000 men. A successful conclusion of the retreat would allow the Germans to create a powerful concentration of almost 570,000 men in Yugoslavia that would require the combined actions of the Bulgarian Army, the 3rd Ukrainian Front and the People's Liberation Army of Yugoslavia in order for it to be defeated.

The Bulgarians, placed under the battle order of the 3rd Ukrainian Front, were tasked with advancing in three directions – Sofia to Niš to Pristina, Kyustendil to Skopje, and Blagoevgrad to Veles. The Second Army under Major General Kiril Stanchev was to attack in the first direction and deliver a strike against the Germans.

The Nis Operations lasted from 8 to 18 October 1944. The objective of the Second Army was to defeat the forces that were deployed around Niš and thus cut the retreat routes along the river Morava. For the operation the army consisted of eight units – 4th, 6th, 9th and 12th infantry divisions along with the 1st Guards Infantry division, 2nd Cavalry Division, the Armored Brigade and 4th Border Brigade.

Only two days after the operation began the Bulgarians penetrated in the Morava valley and on 14 October captured Niš. In the area around the village of Meroshina the Bulgarians defeated the main forces of the 7th SS Volunteer Mountain Division Prinz Eugen allowing the Army to complete its objectives by reaching Podujevo and preparing for further offensive actions.

The Kosovo operation was the logical continuation of the Niš operation. It began on 25 October and ended on 30 November. The objective of the Second Army was to seize the Kosovo plain which would mark the end of the first phase of the war against Germany.

Despite the 1st Guards Infantry division and the 2nd Cavalry Division being transferred to other areas, the Bulgarians could still count on their numerical superiority, the support of the Soviet Air Force and cooperation with the Yugoslav Partisans. The attack began on 25 October with a decisive penetration of the German lines around Podujevo. The advance was hampered by the strong German resistance and the onset of Winter, but the Bulgarians managed to capture Pristina on 19 November and enter Kosovo with their main forces. The Germans now retreated and were pursued by the Second Army which reached the Rashka – Novi Pazar line by the end of the month. This marked the end of the Kosovo Operation and the first phase of the Bulgarian participation in the war against Germany.

The Bulgarians and Soviets reached an agreement to only use the Bulgarian First Army for the next phase of the war – the advance to Hungary and Austria.

== Commanders ==
- Lieutenant-General Nikola Ivanov (September 17, 1912 - July 11, 1913)
- Lieutenant General Vasil Kutinchev (July 11, 1913 - 1914)
- Lieutenant General Georgi Todorov (October 1915 – February 1917)
- Major General Ivan Lukov (February 1917 – October 1918)
- Lieutenant General Ivan Markov (1941 - November 16, 1943)
- Lieutenant General Nikola Stoychev (November 16, 1943 - September 13, 1944), executed February 1945
- Major General Kiril Stanchev (September 13, 1944 - August 6, 1946)

== See also ==
- First Army
- Third Army
- Fourth Army
- 11th Macedonian Infantry Division

== Sources ==
- Hall, Richard C. (2000). The Balkan Wars, 1912–1913: Prelude to the First World War. Routledge. ISBN 0-415-22946-4.
- Erickson, Edward J. (2003). Defeat in Detail: The Ottoman Army in the Balkans, 1912–1913. Greenwood Publishing Group. ISBN 0-275-97888-5.
- Щаб на войската. Войната между България и Турция, vol. I ; Държавна печатница,София 1937
- Щаб на войската. Войната между България и Турция, vol. V, part 2 ; Държавна печатница,София 1930
- Министерство на войната, Щаб на войската (1941). Войната между България и другите Балкански държави през 1913 год. Vol. I. Държавно издателство.
- Христов, А. (1946). Печатница на Армейското боенно издателство.
- Министерство на войната, Щаб на войската (1938). Българската армия в Световната война 1915 – 1918, Vol. III. Държавна печатница, София.
- Hall, Richard (2010). Balkan Breakthrough: The Battle of Dobro Pole 1918. Indiana University Press. ISBN 978-0-253-35452-5.
- The participation of the Bulgarian Army in the Second World War (1941–1945) (in Bulgarian)
