= Antonios Zois =

Greek chieftain of the Macedonian Struggle

Kapetan (Chieftain) Antonios Zois
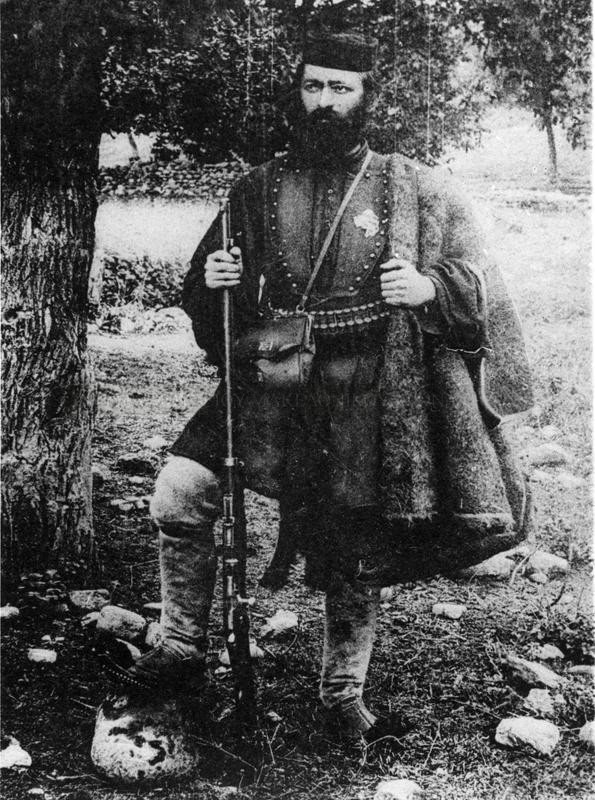
- Zois during the Macedonian Struggle.
- Native name: Αντώνιος Ζώης
- Born: c. 1869; Monastir, Monastir Vilayet, Ottoman Empire (now Bitola, Republic of North Macedonia)
- Died: April 1941 (aged 71–72); Florina, Kingdom of Greece
- Allegiance: IMRO (1903); Kingdom of Greece
- Service / branch: HMC; Hellenic Army
- Battles / wars: Ilinden Uprising; Macedonian Struggle; Balkan Wars: First Balkan War; Second Balkan War
- Awards: Commemorative Medal for the Macedonian Struggle

Antonios Zois (Greek: Αντώνιος Ζώης; c. 1869–1941) was a Greek chieftain of the Macedonian Struggle from Monastir.

== Biography ==
Antonios Zois was born in about 1869 (Note: Εκλογικός κατάλογος του δήμου Φλώρινας του 1914) in Monastir. On 17 April 1903, the Bulgarian anarchist group "Boatmen of Thessaloniki" blew up the French-flagged steamboat "Guadalquivir". The event provoked retaliation by the Ottoman authorities against all Christians. The events of Thessaloniki caused similar situations in Monastir, where on 23 April (Saint George's feast day) assaults against the Christians were recorded. Antonios Zois was being hunted by Turkish soldiers and others, who were chasing him with knives. He managed to escape them taking refuge in the house of a Jew who hid him. Later the same year, he took part in the Ilinden–Preobrazhenie Uprising which was organised by Bulgarians and was active in the general area of Mariovo. At the end of December 1903, he withdrew from Mariovo disagreeing with the actions of the Bulgarians against the Greeks. When he was leaving he told the local leaders that he took part in the uprising to fight the Turks, and not force others to become Bulgarians.

He returned to the area in September 1904, under the command of the leader of the National Committee of Monastir, the physician Konstantinos Michail "of Munich", aiming to organise the Greeks of the area into a military force. He formed an armed corps to protect the citizens from the Bulgarian komitadjis. He managed to organise these Greeks and many soldiers joined his corps from the villages Gruništa, Staravina, Zovič, Budimirci, Gradešnica, Petalino, Makovo, Suhodoli, Paralovo, Brod και Skotsiviri. From April 1905, he cooperated with the Greek officer Christos Tsolakopoulos (nom-de-guerre "Rembelos") and his replacement, Dimitrios Vardis. In 1906, he was injured and he had to move to Athens to be hospitalised. In July 1906, he returned to Macedonia, cooperating with the chieftain Lazaros Varzis ("Zarkadas") from Galatini. Then he cooperated with the officer Vasileios Papas ("Vrontas") and his replacement Dimitrios Papavieros's ("Gouras") until 1908. After the Young Turk revolution he was assigned to monitor the Turks and the Bulgarians in the area of Monastir. When it was discovered that the Young Turks were planning his assassination, he was smuggled out to the United States and returned on the eve of the First Balkan War, in which he participated, leading a corps of volunteers. In October 1912, Antonios Zois liberated Mariovo from the Ottoman Empire and raised the Greek flag. After the Treaty of Bucharest, however, the area was annexed to the Kingdom of Serbia.

After the Balkan Wars, Antonios Zois settled in Florina. There he worked as a supervisor of education. During the Greco-Italian War, Zois, being old and ill, moved to the village of Flampouro for safety reasons, as Florina was often bombed by the Regia Aeronautica.

He committed suicide in April 1941, when the German Army captured Florina.

== Sources ==
- Αρχείο Διεύθυνσης Εφέδρων Πολεμιστών Αγωνιστών Θυμάτων Αναπήρων (ΔΕΠΑΘΑ), Αρχείο Μακεδονικού Αγώνα, φ. Ζ-115
- Ιωάννης Σ. Κολιόπουλος (επιστημονική επιμέλεια), Αφανείς, γηγενείς Μακεδονομάχοι, Εταιρεία Μακεδονικών Σπουδών, University Studio Press, Θεσσαλονίκη, 2008, p. 178
- Λάζαρου Μέλλιου, Ο Μακεδονικός Αγώνα και η συμβολή της Φλώρινας, Εκδόσεις Δήμου Φλώρινας, Φλώρινα, 1985, p. 46
- Η ένοπλη δράση του Βολάνη στο Μορίχοβο 1906, Douglas Dakin, Ο Ελληνικός Αγώνας στη Μακεδονία, εκδ. οίκος αδελφών Κυριακίδη, 1996
- Το κίνημα της 29 Ιουλίου 1903, μέρος Γ΄, Γ. Μόδη, "Ο Μακεδονικός Αγών και η νεώτερη μακεδονική ιστορία", εκδ. Β’ της Εταιρίας Μακεδονικών Σπουδών
- Το κίνημα της 29 Ιουλίου 1903, μέρος Α΄, Γ. Μόδη, "Ο Μακεδονικός Αγών και η νεώτερη μακεδονική ιστορία", εκδ. Β’ της Εταιρίας Μακεδονικών Σπουδών
