= Mariovo and Prilep rebellion =

Military conflict

Date	1564/1565 and 1688/89
Location	Mariovo and Prilep, Sanjak of Monastir, Ottoman Empire
Result	Ottoman victory

Belligerents
Orthodox peasants	Ottoman Empire

Mariovo and Prilep rebellion (Macedonian: Мариовско-Прилепска буна, romanized: Mariovsko-Prilepska buna; Bulgarian: Мариовска буна, romanized: Mariovska buna) was the first recorded Slavonic Christian uprising in Ottoman North Macedonia, that took place in 1564–65. Leaders included Dimitri(ja) Stale (or Tale) from Satoka, priest Dimitri(ja) from Gradešnica, Matjo Nikola from Beleštevica, Stojan Pejo and priest Jakov from Staravina.

== Development ==
The Prilep-Mariovo Uprising of 1564–1565 was the earliest recorded Slavic revolt in Ottoman North Macedonia (Ottoman rule started 1395 and lasted until 1913). It was driven by a combination of heavy Ottoman taxation, including the infamous Devshirme (blood tax or child levy), harsh feudal obligations imposed on the local population, and the ongoing oppression of Christian subjects by Ottoman landlords and officials. The uprising began in Mariovo, a mountainous region south of Prilep, where local peasants, supported by the lower clergy and village elders, took up arms in resistance. It quickly spread to Prilep and the surrounding villages as the rebels seized control of certain areas and expelled Ottoman officials. However, the Ottoman authorities responded with brutal repression, sending a large military force to crush the revolt.

The leaders of the Mariovo rebellion were three peasants and two priests from Mariovo. After being caught by the local authorities, they were sentenced to death. Leaders included 1. Dimitri Stale from Satoka, 2. priest Dimitrija from Gradešnica, 3. Matjo Nikola from Beleštevica, 4. Stojan Pejo, and 5. priest Jakov from Staravina

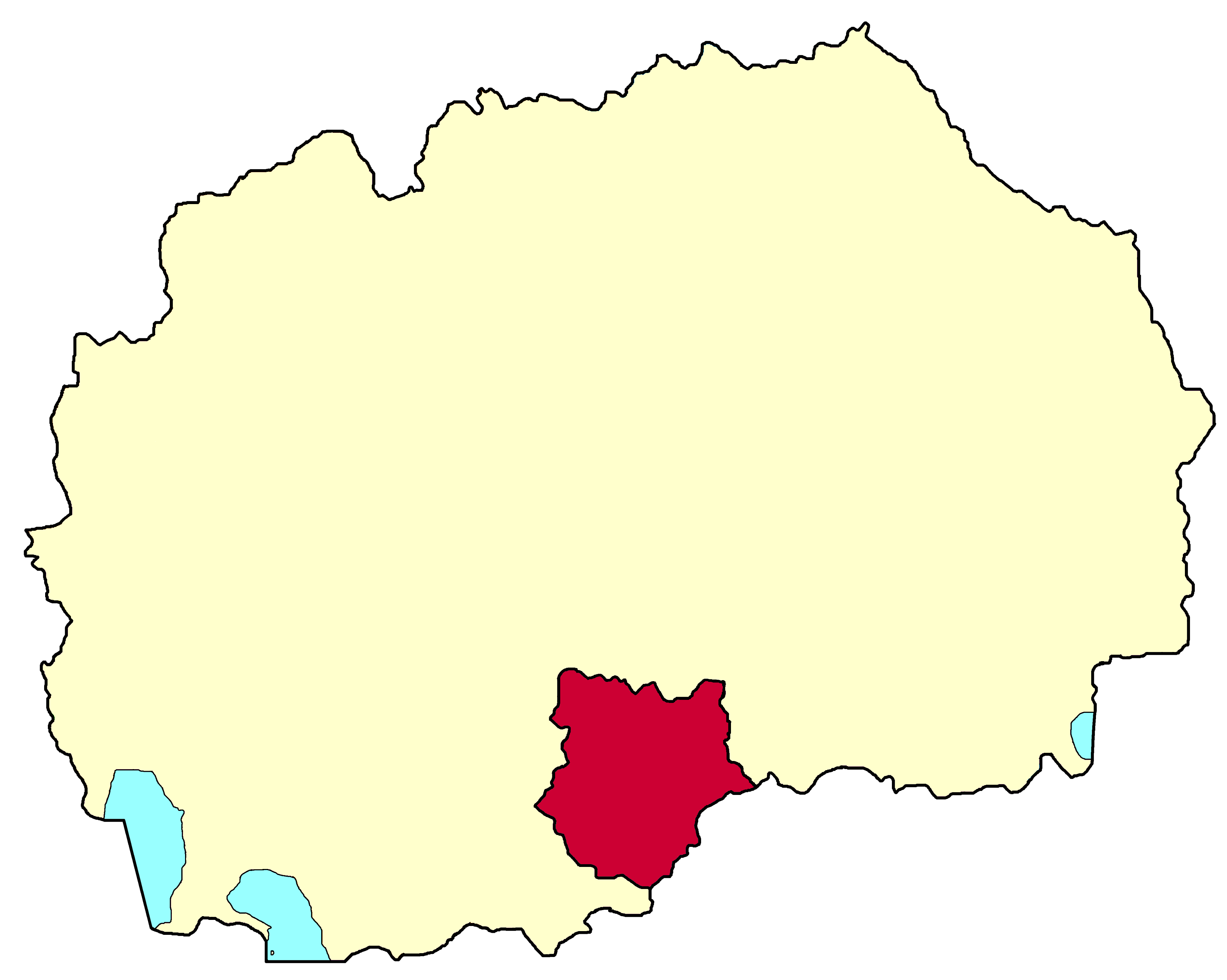
Mariovo area on the map of North Macedonia

The leaders were either executed or exiled, and harsh reprisals followed against the local population. On December 4, 1565, a new sultan's order was issued to establish order and restore peace. It is believed that this rebellion was bloodily suppressed, since the villages of Satoka and Peshtje (Bešište) disappeared at that time. The Ottoman military presence in the region was strengthened to prevent future revolts. This rebellion is still one of the reasons that Mariovo was never Islamized.

The Mariovo Uprising of 1688–1689 took place during the Great Turkish War, a conflict between the Ottoman Empire and the Holy League, which included the Austrian Empire, Poland, Venice, and Russia. The revolt was inspired by Austrian victories against the Ottomans and fueled by hopes that the Habsburgs would liberate Macedonia, especially after they captured Skopje in 1689, though they later retreated. The continued oppression of the Christian population under the Ottoman feudal system further contributed to the uprising. It was organized primarily by the local Christian population in Mariovo and the surrounding Prilep region. The rebels launched attacks on Ottoman forces and briefly controlled several villages, but the Ottoman authorities swiftly responded with a military campaign to suppress the revolt. After the Austrians withdrew from Skopje in late 1689, the Ottomans turned their full attention to eliminating resistance in Mariovo. By 1690, the uprising had been completely crushed. Ottoman retribution was severe, with entire villages burned and many civilians either executed or enslaved. The region suffered a lasting economic and demographic decline as a result.

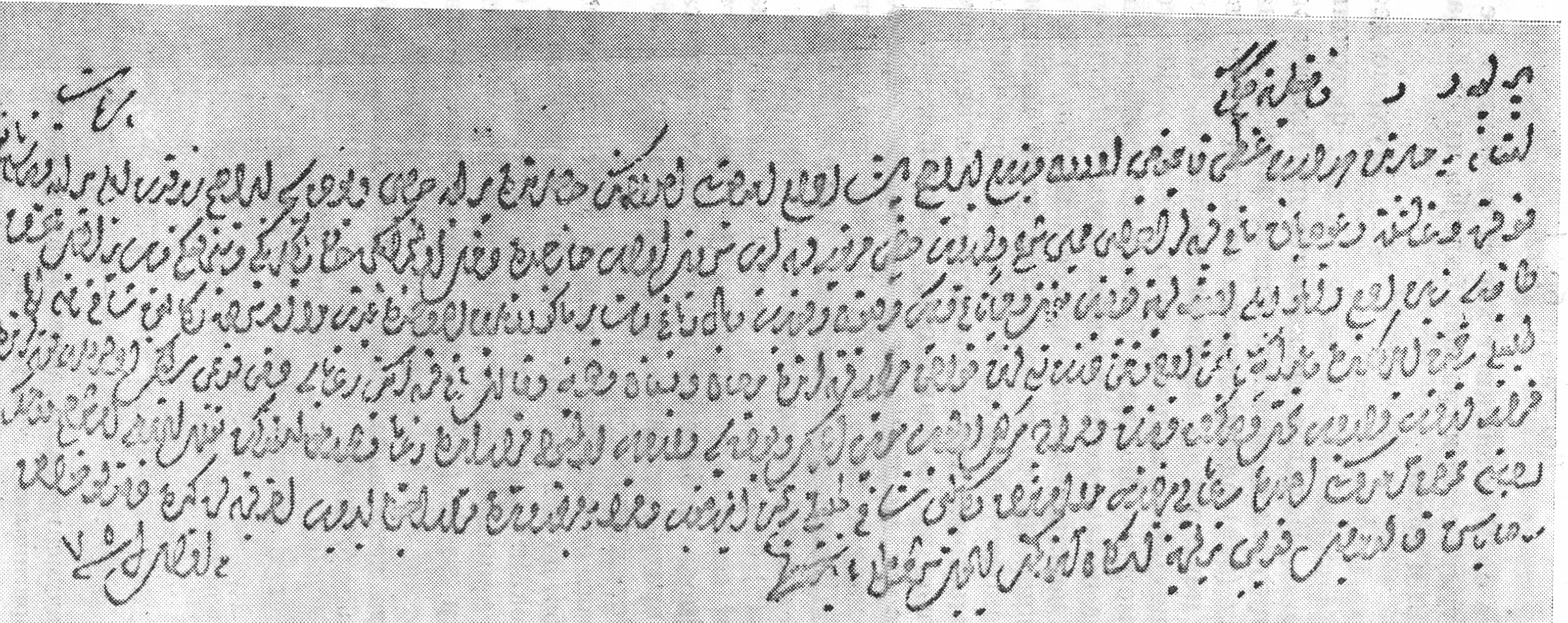
Mariovo uprising Document

== Second Mariovo Uprising (1688–1689) ==
The second Mariovo Uprising (1688–1689) was not widely known until 1933, when the first references to it were discovered in historical records. By 1954, only one document confirming its existence was known, and by 1955, three documents had been identified. These discoveries gradually provided evidence of the uprising, although details remain scarce. There's no evidence confirming the existence of a single, unified Mariovo rebellion in 1688–1689. Instead, records suggest the occurrence of another, smaller-scale peasant uprising of a local nature, which, in terms of intensity and mass participation, cannot be compared to the earlier revolt. This indicates that Mariovo, one of the most isolated and inaccessible regions of Macedonia in the 16th and 17th centuries, frequently experienced unrest and resistance. The region’s geographic position, surrounded by high and forested mountains, likely contributed to the preservation of various unique characteristics. Some scholars have even suggested that Mariovo enjoyed a form of "land autonomy" during this period. However, Dr. A. Stojanovski, based on Ottoman documents, refutes this claim, arguing that while Mariovo did not possess true "land autonomy," the existence of a form of limited village self-government remains a possibility.
