= Monastir offensive =

World War I offensive in the Macedonian front

Coordinates: 41.0319°N 21.4167°E

- Part of the Macedonian front of World War I
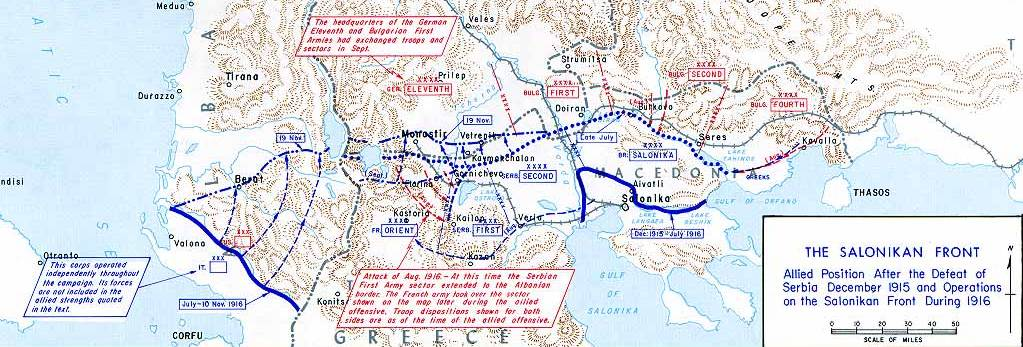
- The Macedonian Front in 1916
Date	12 September 1916 – 11 December 1916
Location	Monastir, Bulgarian-occupied Kingdom of Serbia (present-day North Macedonia)
Result	Allied Powers victory: Capture of Monastir; Limited Allied gains; Stabilization of the front line

Belligerents
Allied Powers: France; Serbia; United Kingdom; Italy; Russia	Central Powers: Bulgaria; Germany; Ottoman Empire

Commanders and leaders
(French Third Republic) Maurice Sarrail; (Kingdom of Serbia) Petar Bojović; (Kingdom of Serbia) Živojin Mišić; (United Kingdom of Great Britain and Ireland) George Milne; (Kingdom of Italy) Carlo P. di Roreto; Mikhail Diterikhs	(Tsardom of Bulgaria (1908–1946)) Nikola Zhekov; (Tsardom of Bulgaria (1908–1946)) Dimitar Geshov; (Tsardom of Bulgaria (1908–1946)) Georgi Todorov; (German Empire) Otto von Below (German Empire) Arnold von Winckler; (Ottoman Empire) Abdul Kerim Pasha

Strength
(Kingdom of Serbia) 122,596; (United Kingdom of Great Britain and Ireland) 119,176; (French Third Republic) 115,396; (Kingdom of Italy) c. 30,000; c. 10,000; Total: c. 397,168 men (250,000 – 313,000 combatants)	(Tsardom of Bulgaria (1908–1946)) Unknown; (German Empire) Unknown; (Ottoman Empire) 28,186; Total: unknown total men (240,000 – 260,000 combatants)

Casualties and losses
(Kingdom of Serbia) 27,337; (French Third Republic) 13,786; (United Kingdom of Great Britain and Ireland) 4,580; 1,116; (Kingdom of Italy) <1,000; Total: c. 48,000 80,000 died or evacuated due to sickness	(Tsardom of Bulgaria (1908–1946)) 53,000; (German Empire) 8,000; Total: 61,000

The Monastir offensive was an Allied military operation against the forces of the Central Powers during World War I, intended to break the deadlock on the Macedonian front by forcing the capitulation of Bulgaria and relieving the pressure on Romania. The offensive took the shape of a large battle and lasted for three months and ended with the capture of the town of Monastir. On an average depth of 50km, the Bulgarian First Army (from the end of September German Eleventh Army) gave battle on six occasions, being forced to retreat five times.

== Background ==
In August 1916, Romania chose to join the war effort on the side of the Entente and concentrated most of its forces for an invasion of Transylvania, leaving its 3rd army to guard the border with Bulgaria. The Russian and French proposals for a joint attack of the Romanian Army and the Allied Salonika Army against Bulgaria were no longer realistic. The Allies, however, still planned a large offensive in the Macedonian front for the middle of August to support Romania's entry into the war and pin down as many Bulgarian forces as possible.

The Bulgarian High Command suspected an impending offensive, and the fighting around Doiran that erupted on 9 August only confirmed these suspicions. On their part, the Bulgarians had urged for an offensive in Macedonia since the beginning of the year, now planning to strike with the First Army and Second Army on both Allied flanks. The Germans also gave their sanction for the plan as the former army was part of Army Group Mackensen.

On 17 August, the Chegan and Struma offensives began. On the left flank, the Bulgarian Second Army, meeting little resistance on its way, seized all the Greek territory up to the Struma river. On the right flank, the Bulgarian First Army captured Lerin and continued advancing in the face of stiffening Allied resistance. The advance soon bogged down, the offensive was called off on 27 August, and the Bulgarian forces were ordered to dig in. This pre-emptive strike, however, thwarted general Sarrail's plans and forced him to postpone his offensive.

The need for an Allied attack against Bulgaria became even more urgent in early September 1916, as the Bulgarian Third Army under general Stefan Toshev and field marshal Mackensen achieved decisive victories against the Romanian and Russians in the battles of Tutrakan and Dobrich.

== Opposing forces ==
By September 1916, the Allies had gathered a substantial force of 6 Serbian, 5 British, 4 French, 1 Italian infantry division and 1 Russian infantry brigade for operations on the Macedonian front. The ratio strength of this army reached between 369,000 and 400,000 men. The battle strength was deployed in 201 infantry battalions with 1,025 artillery pieces and 1,300 machine guns.

The Central Powers could initially oppose these forces with the Bulgarian First Army, German Eleventh Army and Bulgarian Second Army in total 172 infantry battalions, c. 900 artillery pieces. In addition, there was also the 10th Bulgarian Infantry Division and the forces protecting the Aegean coast from the river Struma to the border with the Ottoman Empire – 25 infantry battalions, 31 artillery batteries and 24 machine guns.

General Sarrail planned to strike at the right wing and center of the overextended First Army with his Serbian, French, Russian and Italian forces and content himself with only demonstrative attacks against the Vardar valley and the Struma, that were to be conducted by the British to pin down as many Bulgarian and German troops as possible.

== The offensive ==
=== Opening phase ===
On 12 September, the Allies opened their offensive with a powerful two-day artillery barrage and an attack by the Serbian Third Army and the French Army of the Orient against the Bulgarian 8th Tundzha Infantry Division and colonel Tasev's reinforced brigade. The situation soon deteriorated for the Bulgarians, and on 14 September, they were forced to retreat towards Lerin, leaving behind some of their artillery guns and abandoning Gornichevo to the Serbians. On 12 September, the Serbians also began their first attack on the 2,300-meter-high (7,500 ft) Kaimakchalan ridge. The British also became active on the Struma front and tried to expand their footholds on its right bank.

The Bulgarian First Army's western flank now managed to hold the Allies on the Lerin – Kajmakcalan line. The Allies, however, continued their attacks, and on 23 September, after heavy fighting, the French entered Lerin. The Bulgarians were still holding on Kajmakcalan, where the 1st Infantry Brigade of the 3rd Balkan Infantry Division was attacked by a superior number of Serbian troops supported by heavy French artillery. The fighting was very costly for the attackers and the defenders, as the bare, rocky ridge provided almost no cover from the Bulgarian machine gun fire or the Allied artillery.

The Bulgarian setbacks attracted greater attention from both the Bulgarian and German high commands, and soon, several vital changes in the command structure were made. On 27 September, General Kliment Boyadzhiev was replaced as commander of the First Army by General Dimitar Geshov. The army itself exchanged headquarters with the Eleventh Army of General Arnold von Winckler. This was followed by the arrival on the front of General Otto von Below and the establishment of Army Group Below on 16 October, which included both the Eleventh and First Armies.

On 30 September, after 18 days of heavy fighting, the Serbian Drina Division finally captured Kajmakcalan from the exhausted 1st infantry brigade of the 3rd Balkan Infantry Division, achieving a breakthrough in the Bulgarian defensive line. The German and Bulgarian commands regarded the loss of the position and seven artillery guns as irreversible due to the lack of a capable artillery reserve. General Winckler ordered the 8th Tundzha Divisions, the 1st and 3rd brigades of the 6th Bdin Division and the 2nd Brigade of the 9 Pleven Division to withdraw to a new defensive position. The 1st Brigade of the 3rd Balkan Division was reorganized, and its depleted nine battalions were scaled down to five, with four mixed companies with seven mountain guns and a pioneer company. The new Kenali defensive line was occupied from Lake Prespa to Kenali by the three independent infantry brigades (9/2 IB, 2/6 IB and 1/6 IB), from Kenali to the heights east of the Cherna river by the 8th division and from there to the Mala Rupa peak by the 1/3 Infantry Brigade. Further to the east were the remaining forces of the Eleventh Army – the rest of the 3rd Balkan Infantry Division, whose positions remained unchanged since they were occupied on 25 July 1916.

=== Secondary operations ===
Around that time, when it became clear that the Allies were pulling troops from the eastern flank and were concentrating them against Monastir, the commander of the Bulgarian Second Army General Todorov ordered the 7th Rila Division to take positions for an attack over the Struma river, to assist the hard pressed Bulgarians and Germans west of the Vardar. The Bulgarian high command, however, refused to permit the attack. This hesitation allowed the British to consolidate their positions on the left bank of the Struma around the village of Karacaköy on 30 September. On 3 October, the 10th (Irish) Division attacked the Bulgarian positions in the village of Yenikoy that were defended by the 13th Rila Regiment of the 7th Division. The battle lasted for the entire day, and the Bulgarians, reinforced by the 14th Macedonian Regiment and 17th Artillery Regiment, retook the village twice after a fierce bayonet struggle. During the night after a third and final attack, the Irish division occupied it. Casualties on both sides were heavy due to the accurate artillery and machine gun fire. After the battle, the Bulgarian 13th Regiment was reorganized to a three-battalion strength instead of the usual four battalions. After 4 October, the Bulgarians set up positions on the nearby heights to the east while the right flank of the 7th Rila division remained in the valley to protect the Rupel Pass. From this point on, no large operations were conducted on the Struma front until the end of the offensive.

=== Prelude to decisive battle ===
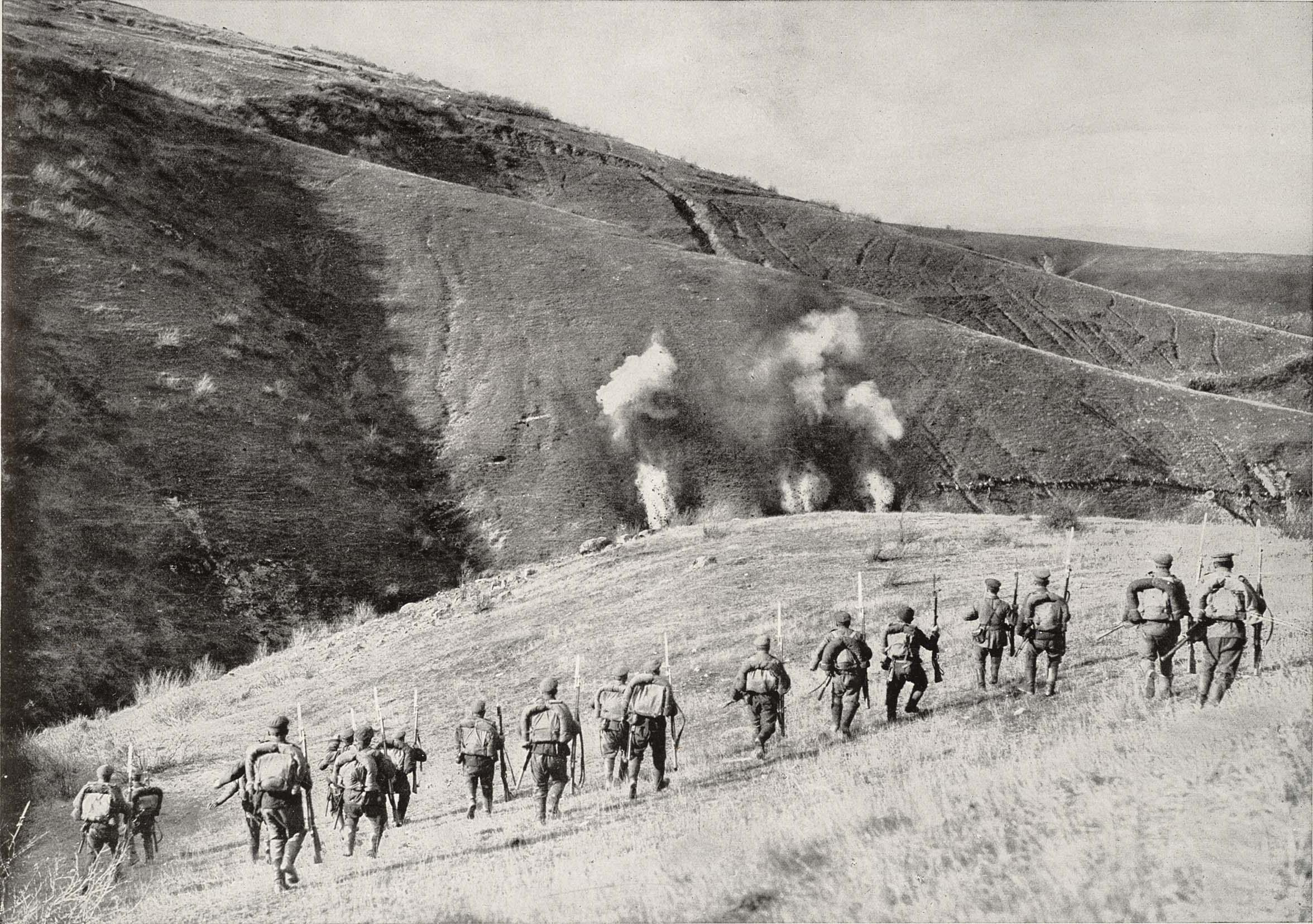
Bulgarian infantry attack in the Monastir area.

A prime problem for the Bulgarians was that their army and resources were stretched to the limits from Dobruja to Macedonia and Albania. The Bulgarian high command turned to its German allies. The Germans themselves had few reinforcements to offer as the Brusilov offensive had taken its toll, and the Battle of the Somme was still raging. They turned to the Ottoman Empire and convinced Enver Pasha to send the 11,979 men of the 50th Division to Macedonia. In October, these forces took up position on the Struma and, a month later, were joined by the 12,609 men of the 46th Ottoman Division. The two divisions formed the XX Corps and remained in the region until May 1917, when they were recalled to Mesopotamia. This freed some Bulgarian forces that could now be directed to reinforce the Eleventh Army. In addition, the Ottoman Rumeli Detachment (177th Regiment) of 3,598 men was also attached to General Winckler's forces.

On 30 September, General Joffre informed General Sarrail of the impending great offensive of the Romanian and Russian forces under General Averescu against the Bulgarian Third Army in Dobrudja and their expected crossing of the Danube between Ruse and Tutrakan. The Allied Army of the East commander planned to now use this by coordinating it with a renewed push against the Eleventh Army's Kenali line and eventually knocking Bulgaria out of the war. On 4 October, the Allies attacked the French and Russians in the direction of Monastir – Kenali, the Serbian First and Third Army along the Kenali – Cherna Loop line, the Serbian Second Army against the Third Balkan Division – in the direction of Dobro Pole. The Allies had 103 battalions and 80 batteries against the 65 battalions and 57 batteries of the Central Powers in the area.

=== Fall of Monastir and end of the offensive ===
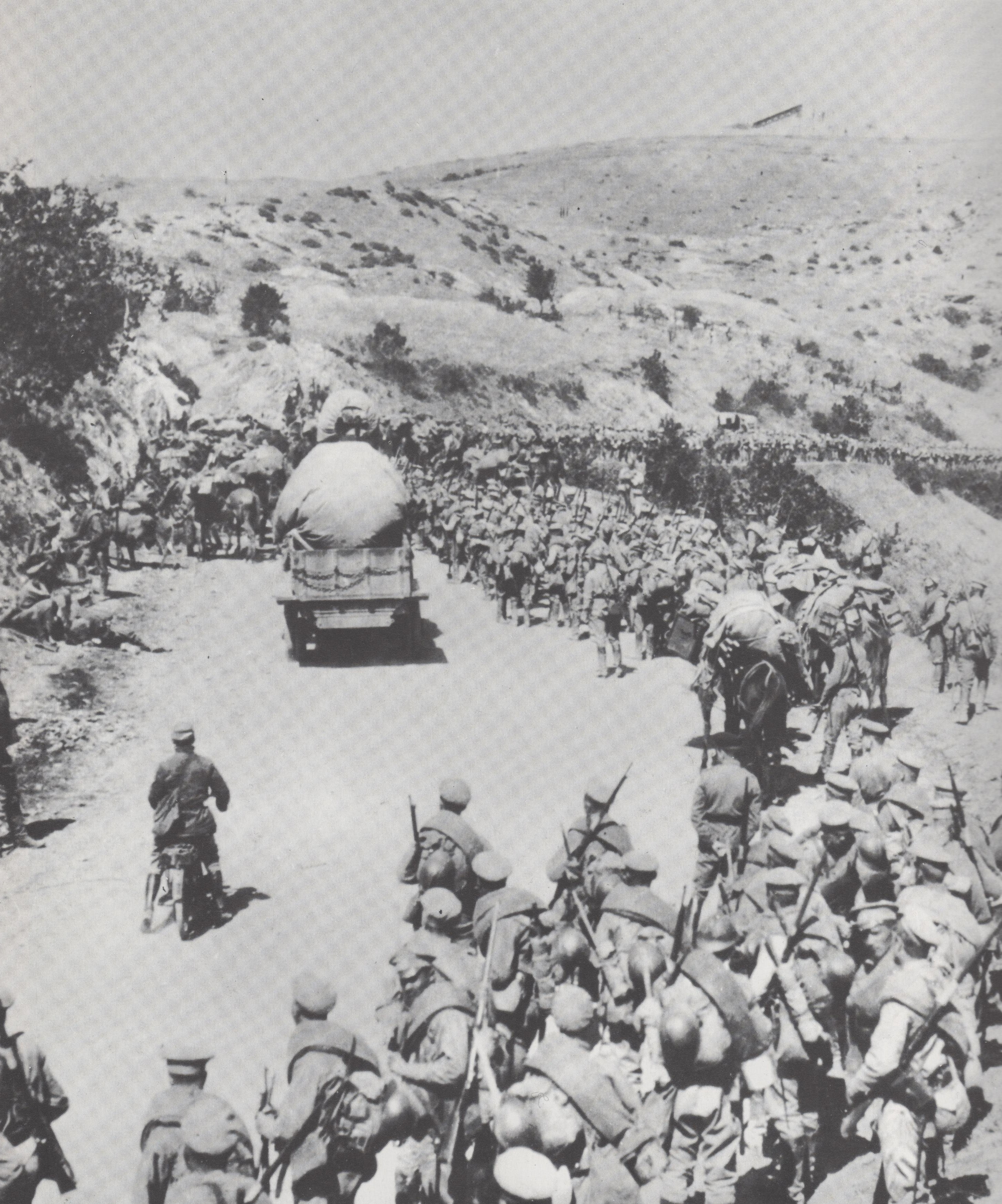
General Dieterichs' Russian brigade on the march in Macedonia

The Battle of the River Cherna opened with the Serbians trying to gain a foothold on its northern bank. Their progress was slow, and further west, the initial French and Russian attacks were repulsed. During the following weeks, the battle developed into a series of attacks and counter-attacks in which the Allies gradually gained ground, owing to their artillery superiority. The Bulgarian and German commands also tried to stabilize the situation by reinforcing the Eleventh Army with troops transferred from the First and even the Second Army. For the duration of the battle at the Cherna Loop, some 14 Bulgarian and 4 German infantry regiments participated actively in the fighting. The French and Russians achieved a breakthrough around Kenali by the end of October but were soon halted by the Bulgarians and Germans. The Italian division was also brought to the front and supported the attacks around Monastir.

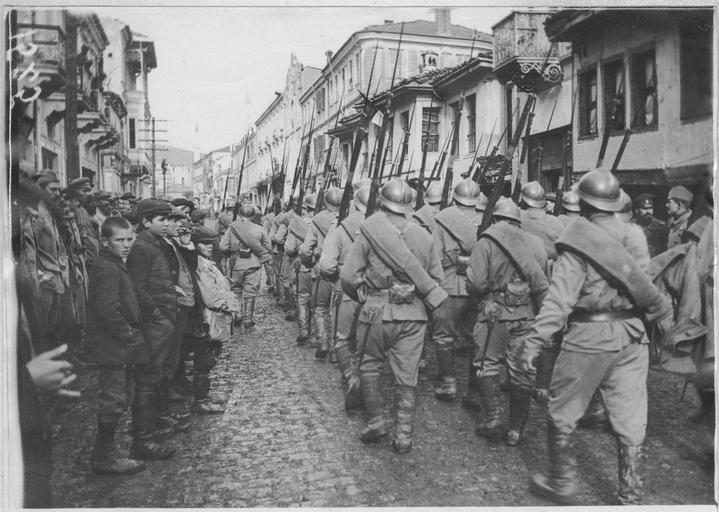
French troops in Monastir, 22 November.

By this time, however, General Below had decided to abandon Monastir, and on 18 November, while the heavy fighting was still going on, General der Infanterie Winckler ordered the Eleventh Army to retreat to new positions to the north of Monastir. The Bulgarian commander in chief, General Nikola Zhekov, protested this decision, but in the end, he couldn't stop its execution. On 19 November, French and Russian soldiers entered the town. The Bulgarians established a new position on the Chervena Stena – height 1248 – height 1050 – Makovo – Gradešnica defensive line. It came under attack almost immediately, but this time the new position held firm because the Allies were exhausted, having reached the limits of their logistical capacity. Thus all French and Serbian attempts to break through the line were defeated, and with the onset of winter, the front stabilized along its entire length. On 11 December, General Joffre called off the offensive.

== Aftermath ==
For the duration of the offensive, the Allies suffered around 50,000 battle casualties, the bulk of them Serbians. In addition, some 80,000 Allied troops died or had to be evacuated due to sickness and disease. This brought the total casualties to as high as 130,000 men, or a third of all Entente forces in the theatre. The front was moved by only about 50km at a heavy price, and in the end, the offensive did not prevent the defeat of Romania or knock Bulgaria out of the war.

The Bulgarians and German casualties totalled around 61,000 men, and even though Monastir had to be abandoned, the new positions a few kilometres to the north provided excellent conditions for defence, assuring the dominance of the Bulgarian artillery over the town. The line here remained intact until the end of the war in Macedonia when the forces occupying it had to retreat due to the breakthrough at Dobro Pole.

However, the offensive also provided some satisfaction as the Serbian troops managed to return to their country's border. The Bulgarians and Germans alike were also satisfied with their resistance to the superior numbers of the Entente. General Nikola Zhekov went as far as to describe the Battle of the River Cherna as "legendary" in terms of the tenacity of the Bulgarian defence – "conducted without regard of casualties."
