= Battle of the Crna Bend (1916) =

1916 battle of the World War I Balkan Theatre

- Part of the Balkans Theatre (World War I)
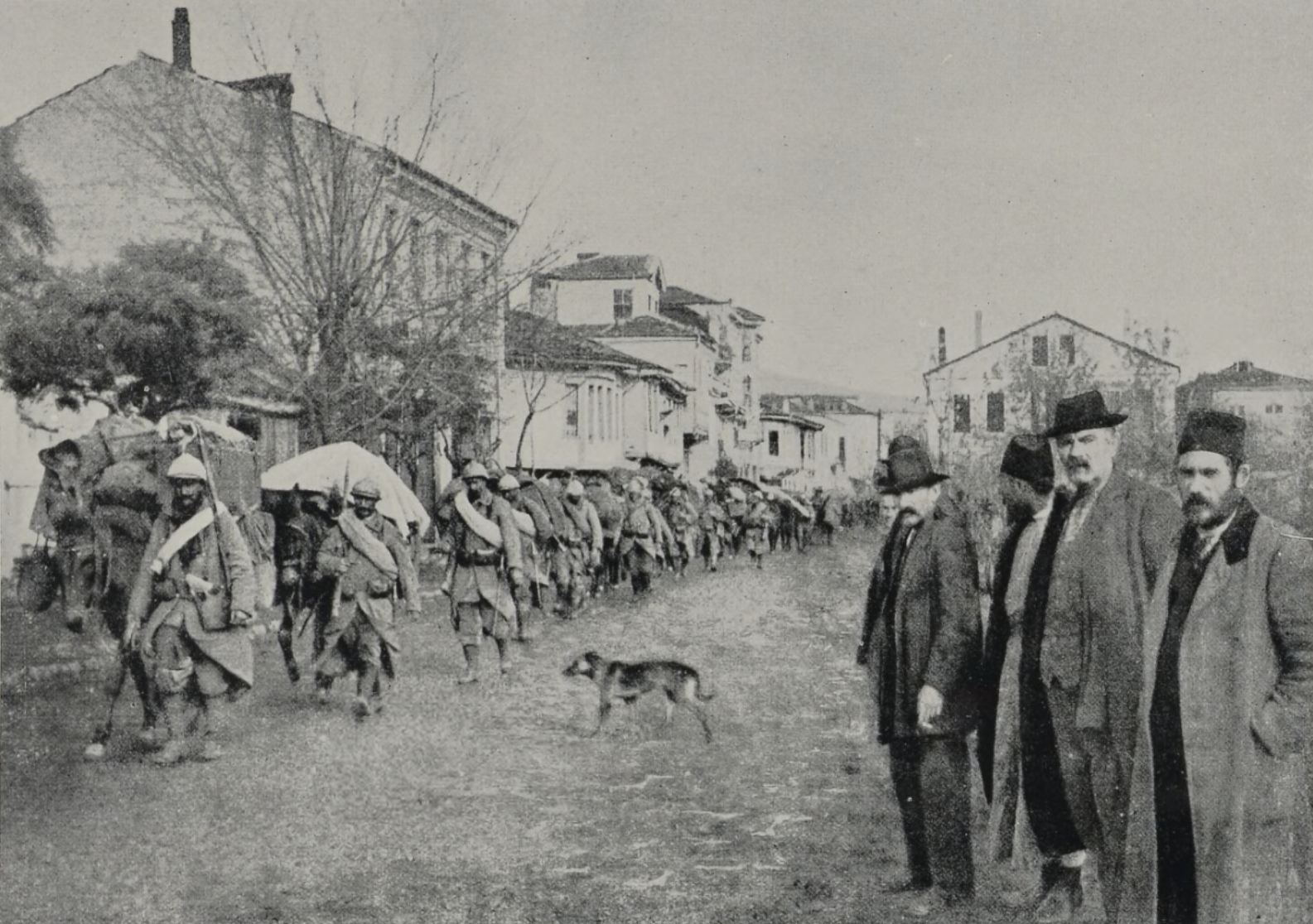
- Entrance of French troops in Bitola on 19 November 1916
| Date | 14 October – 19 November 1916 |
| Location | River Crna bend, Bulgarian-occupied Kingdom of Serbia (present-day North Macedonia) |
| Result | Entente victory |

Belligerents
| France; Serbia; Russian Empire | Bulgaria; German Empire |

Commanders and leaders
| (French Third Republic) Victor Cordonnier; (Kingdom of Serbia) Živojin Mišić | (Tsardom of Bulgaria (1908–1946)) Todor Mitov; (Tsardom of Bulgaria (1908–1946)) Georgi Bolyshakov; (German Empire) Arnold von Winckler |

Units involved
| Unknown | 8th Tundzha Infantry Division |

Casualties and losses
| Unknown | Heavy |

The Battle of the Cherna bend (Note: The Battle of the river bend is traditionally known in English as the Battle of the Cherna bend. English name derived from Bulgarian: Битка при завоя на Черна, Macedonian: Битка на свиокот на Црна. Serbian: Битка на Црној реци, "Battle of the Crna River".) was a two-month-long battle between the Bulgarian and the Entente armies. The battle took place on the Macedonian front during the First World War Allied Monastir offensive in October and November 1916. After extremely heavy fighting and severe casualties on both sides, the Bulgarians retreated from Bitola on 19 November, taking positions 5 kilometres (3.1 mi) to the north by defeating all the later attacks from there. However, the Entente entry in Bitola had no strategic value.

== Battle ==
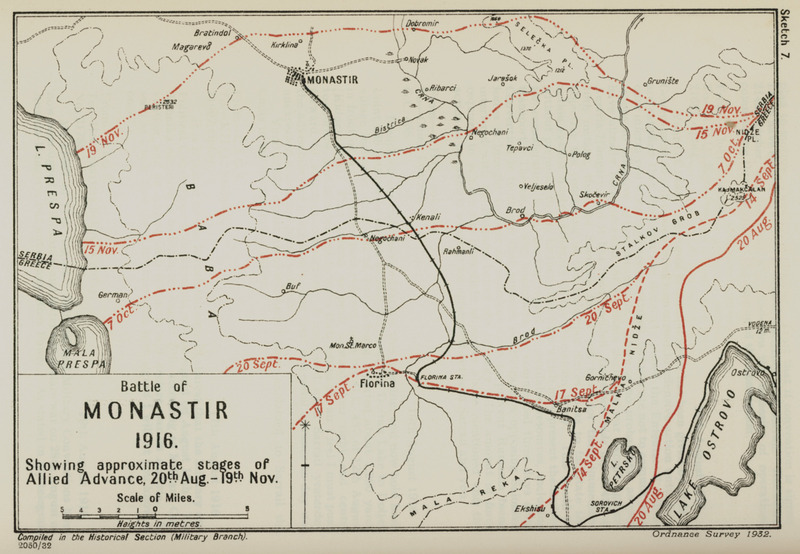
Allied advance August-November 1916

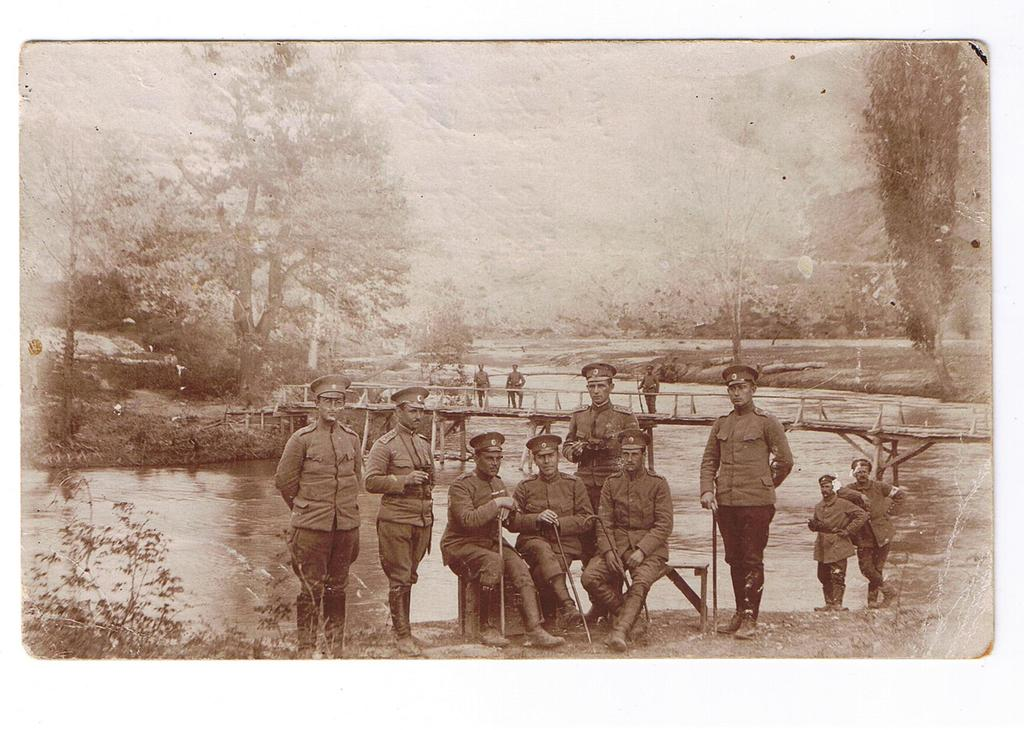
Bulgarian officers at the River Crna in 1917

In August 1916, the Bulgarians launched the Lerin operation. The Entente troops started a counterattack and, on 30 September, took Kajmakčalan with heavy casualties and continued to Bitola. In the area of the River Crna (Macedonian and Serbian: Црна/Crna, Bulgarian: Черна Река/Cherna Reka), the Bulgarian 8th Tundzha Infantry Division had taken hastily defensive positions in September 1916. That division took the main enemy blow. On 5 October, the Serbian troops attempted to cross the river. Some reached the right bank but were counterattacked and defeated by the Bulgarians and had to retreat.

On 6 October, the Serbs attacked again near the villages of Dobroveni and Skochivir but were again counterattacked and pushed back. The Bulgarians took the village of Brod. The Serbs, who had great superiority in artillery, attacked constantly.

On 14 and 15 October 1916, fighting continued without interruption. The Serbian pressure was immense, and the Bulgarians continued to hold their positions. The night of 15 October was one of the high points of the fighting when the Serbs launched eight consecutive attacks, all of which were repulsed. The Serbs then recovered for three days, and on 18 October, they crossed the left bank of the River Crna at Brod and fortified it. The Bulgarian army counterattacked but was repulsed.

On 23 October, the artillery fire of the Entente grew even more. The French were fighting near Kremenica. During the week, the Bulgarians tried to push them back without success, and all Serbian attacks were also unsuccessful, leading to massive casualties for both sides. Due to a lack of munitions, the Bulgarian artillery had to save shells which harmed the soldiers' morale. On 7 November, the enemy artillery started intense fire at the 3/8 Brigade, which occupied positions between Krape and Polog. After three days, the brigade's losses became so immense that on 10 November, it abandoned its positions, which the Serbs took. On 19 November, the Bulgarians also had to retreat from Bitola and took positions 5 kilometres (3.1 mi) north of the town. The front stabilized on the line Pelister - Hill 1248 - Hill 1050 - Dabica - Gradešnica.

== Aftermath ==
The Entente continued with its attempts for a breakthrough against the Bulgarians in the area of the River Crna the following year, again without any success. The allied offensive in spring 1917 was a failure. The Bulgarian-German army continued to hold the Macedonian front against French, British, Serbian and Greek troops until the Franco-Serbian breakthrough at Dobro Pole on 15 September 1918.

== Sources ==
- Недев, Н., България в световната война (1915-1918), София, 2001, Издателство „Анико“, ISBN 954-90700-3-4
- Атанасов, Щ. и др. Българското военно изкуство през капитализма, София, 1959, Държавно военно издателство при МНО
