= Baldovenci =

Baldovenci Балдовенци
- Village
- Location within North Macedonia
- Country: North Macedonia
- Region: Pelagonia
- Municipality: Novaci

Population (2002)
  - Total: 0
- Time zone: UTC+1 (CET)
  - Summer (DST): UTC+2 (CEST)
- Car plates: BT
- Website: .

Baldovenci (Macedonian: Балдовенци) is a village in the Mariovo region, in the municipality of Novaci, North Macedonia. It used to be part of the former municipality of Staravina.

== History ==
One kilometer east of Baldovenci is the archaeological site Arbanasinovac, dating from the Iron Age. The name stems from Arbanas, the old South Slavic ethnonym for Albanian, suggesting either direct linguistic contact with Albanians or the former presence of an assimilated Albanian community.

According to Vasil Kanchov, Baldovenci had 185 residents in 1900, all Bulgarian Christians. In 1905, per Dimitar Mishev, the village population consisted of 136 Bulgarian Exarchists.

The last census in which Baldovenci recorded inhabitants was in 1961 with 170.
