= Dolno Aglarci =

Dolno Aglarci Долно Агларци
- Village
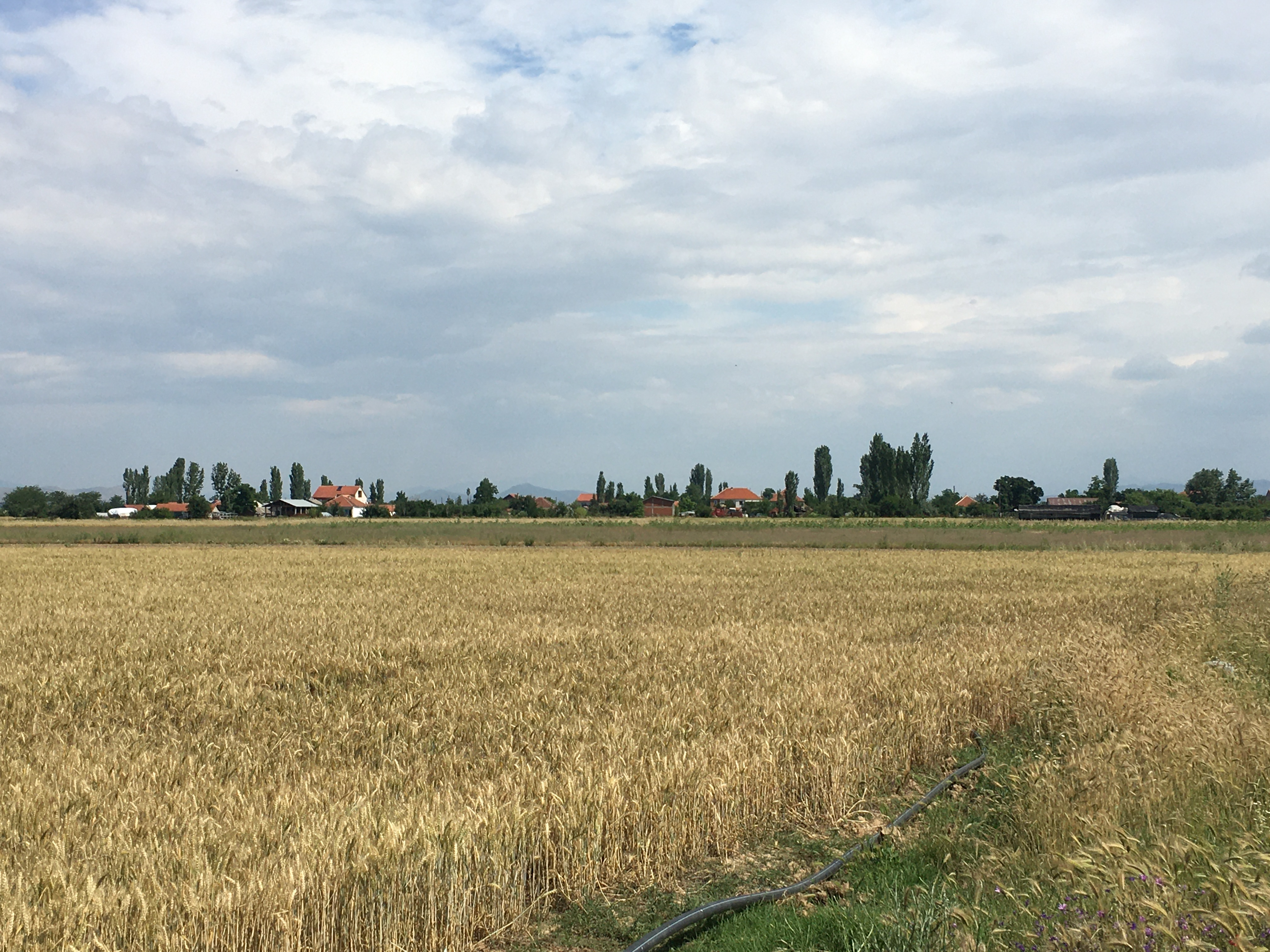
- View of the village

- Location within North Macedonia
- Coordinates: 41.092468°N 21.469404°E
- Country: North Macedonia
- Region: Pelagonia
- Municipality: Novaci

Population (2002)
  - Total: 167
- Time zone: UTC+1 (CET)
  - Summer (DST): UTC+2 (CEST)
- Car plates: BT
- Website: .

Dolno Aglarci (Macedonian: Долно Агларци) is a village in the municipality of Novaci, North Macedonia.

== Demographics ==
According to the 2002 census, the village had a total of 167 inhabitants. Ethnic groups in the village include:

- Macedonians 167
