= Battle of the Cerna Bend =

Battle of the Cerna Bend may refer to:

- Battle of the Crna Bend (1916)
- Battle of the Crna Bend (1917)
