= Gorno Aglarci =

Gorno Aglarci Горно Агларци
- Village
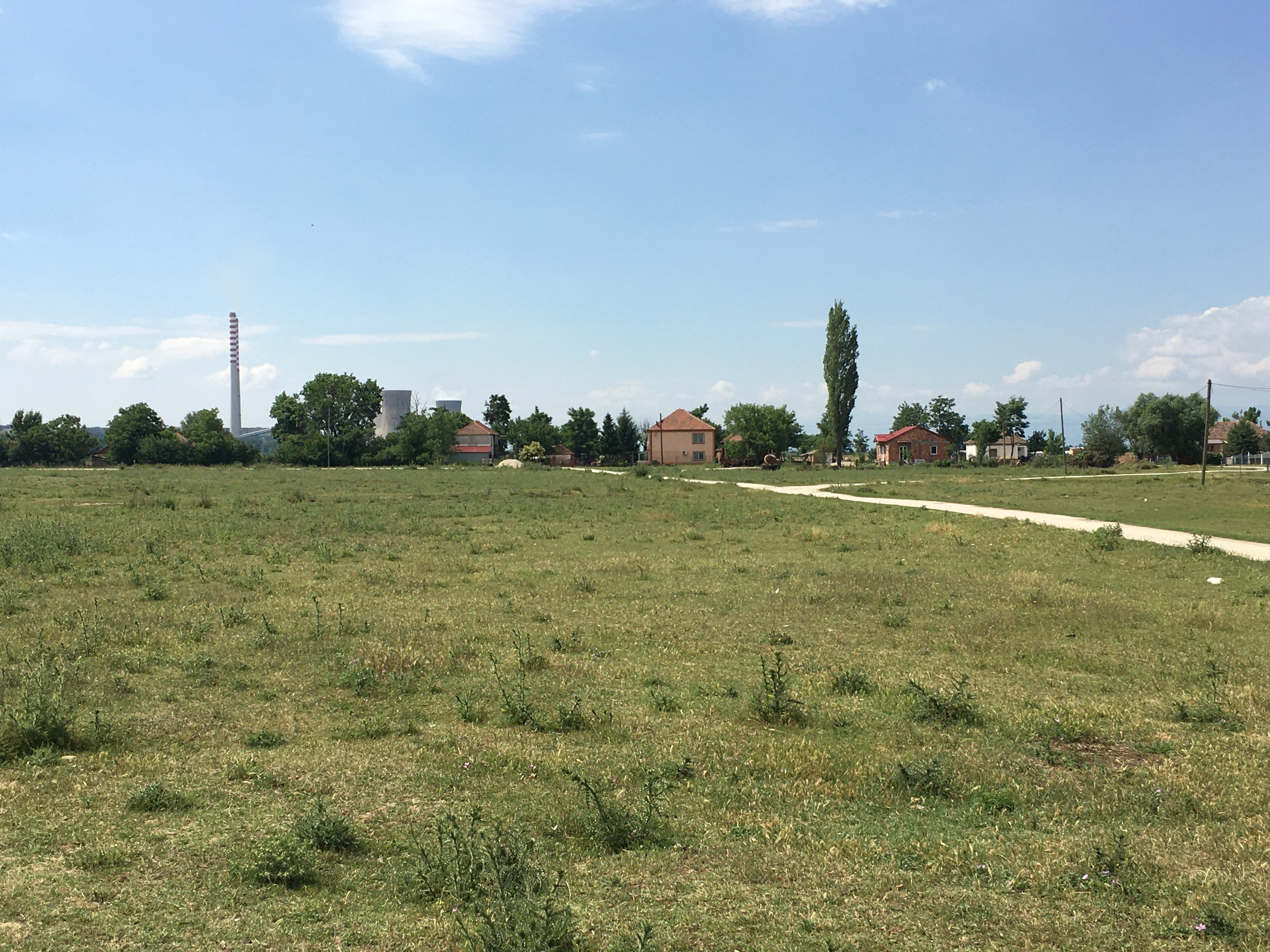

- Location within North Macedonia
- Coordinates: 41.116028°N 21.484251°E
- Country: North Macedonia
- Region: Pelagonia
- Municipality: Novaci

Population (2002)
  - Total: 185
- Time zone: UTC+1 (CET)
  - Summer (DST): UTC+2 (CEST)
- Car plates: BT
- Website: .

Gorno Aglarci (Macedonian: Горно Агларци) is a village in the municipality of Novaci, North Macedonia.

== Demographics ==
According to the 2002 census, the village had a total of 185 inhabitants. Ethnic groups in the village include:

- Macedonians 185
