= Dalbegovci =

Dalbegovci Далбеговци
- Village
- Location within North Macedonia
- Coordinates: 41.108675°N 21.474324°E
- Country: North Macedonia
- Region: Pelagonia
- Municipality: Novaci

Population (2002)
  - Total: 178
- Time zone: UTC+1 (CET)
  - Summer (DST): UTC+2 (CEST)
- Car plates: BT
- Website: .

Dalbegovci (Macedonian: Далбеговци) is a village in the municipality of Novaci, North Macedonia.

== Demographics ==
According to the 2002 census, the village had a total of 178 inhabitants. Ethnic groups in the village include:

- Macedonians 178
