= Tasev =

Tasev (Bulgarian: Тасев) is a Bulgarian and Macedonian masculine surname, its feminine counterpart is Taseva. It may refer to

- Atanas Tasev (1921–20??), Bulgarian sports shooter
- Irina Taseva (1910–1990), Bulgarian actress
- Ivan Tasev (footballer) (born 2002), Bulgarian soccer player
- Ivan Tasev (volleyball) (born 1967), Bulgarian volleyball player
- Katrin Taseva (born 1997), Bulgarian rhythmic gymnast
- Stefan Tasev (1866–?), Bulgarian military officer
- Toni Tasev (born 1994), Bulgarian football winger
