= Tepavci =

Tepavci Тепавци
- Village
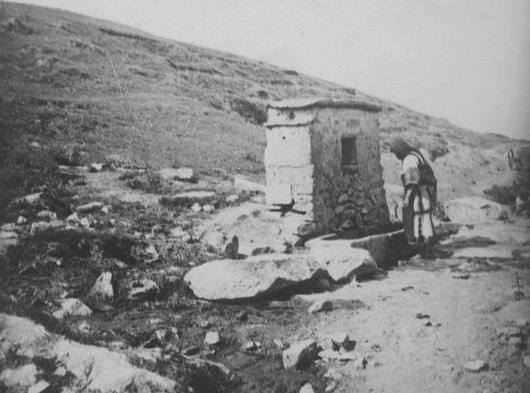
- Тepavci in 1917

- Location within North Macedonia
- Coordinates: 40.99556102412019°N 21.560423175395215°E
- Country: North Macedonia
- Region: Pelagonia
- Municipality: Novaci

Population (2021)
  - Total: 17
- Time zone: UTC+1 (CET)
  - Summer (DST): UTC+2 (CEST)
- Car plates: BT
- Website: .

Tepavci (Macedonian: Тепавци) is a village in the municipality of Novaci, North Macedonia.

== Demographics ==
According to the 2021 census, the village had a total of 17 inhabitants. Ethnic groups in the village include:

- Macedonians 16
- Albanians 1
