= Armatuš =

Armatuš Арматуш Armatush
- Village
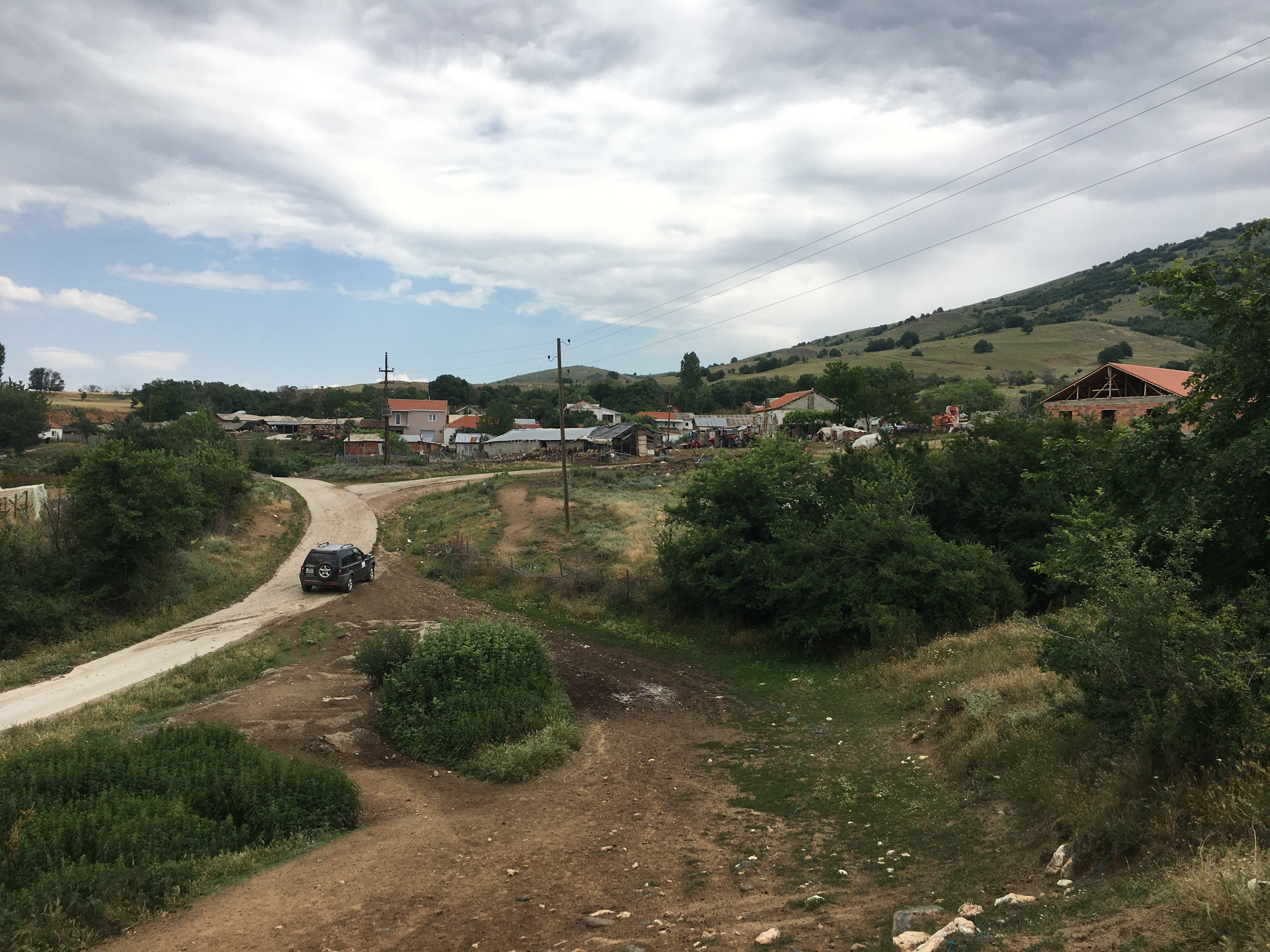
- View of the village

- Location within North Macedonia
- Coordinates: 41°06′N 21°32′E
- Country: North Macedonia
- Region: Pelagonia
- Municipality: Novaci

Population (2002)
  - Total: 41
- Time zone: UTC+1 (CET)
  - Summer (DST): UTC+2 (CEST)
- Car plates: BT
- Website: .

Armatuš (Macedonian: Арматуш, Albanian: Armatush) is a village in the municipality of Novaci, North Macedonia.

== Demographics ==
Armatuš has traditionally and exclusively been populated by Muslim Albanians.

According to the 2021 census, the village had a total of 32 inhabitants. Ethnic groups in the village include:

- Albanians 32

According to the 2002 census, the village had a total of 41 inhabitants. Ethnic groups in the village include:

- Turks 25
- Albanians 16
