= Zoviḱ =

Zoviḱ Зовиќ
- Village
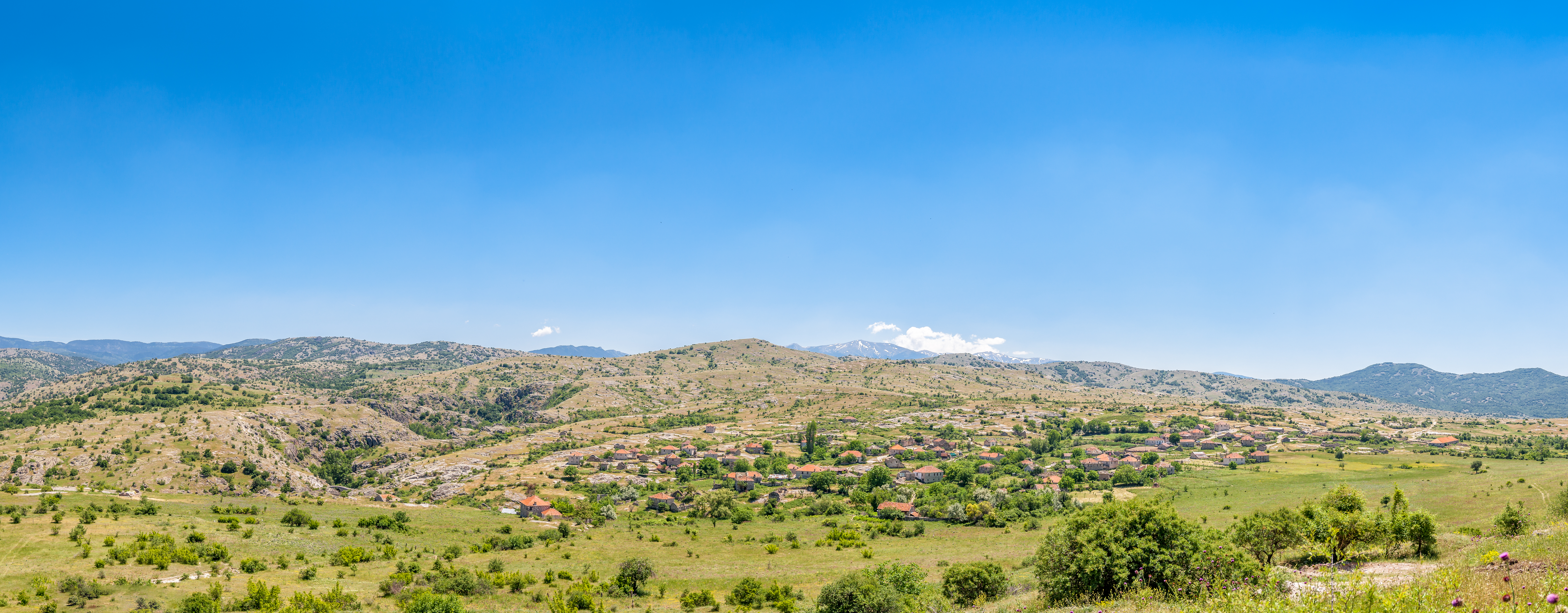

- Location within North Macedonia
- Coordinates: 41°07′01″N 21°42′48″E
- Country: North Macedonia
- Region: Pelagonia
- Municipality: Novaci
- Elevation: 725 m (2,379 ft)

Population (2002)
  - Total: 31
- Time zone: UTC+1 (CET)
  - Summer (DST): UTC+2 (CEST)

Zoviḱ (Macedonian: Зовиќ) is a village in the municipality of Novaci, North Macedonia. It used to be part of the former municipality of Staravina.

== Demographics ==
According to the 2002 census, the village had a total of 31 inhabitants. Ethnic groups in the village include:

- Macedonians 31
