= Dolno Orehovo =

- Долно Орехово; Orehova e Poshtme
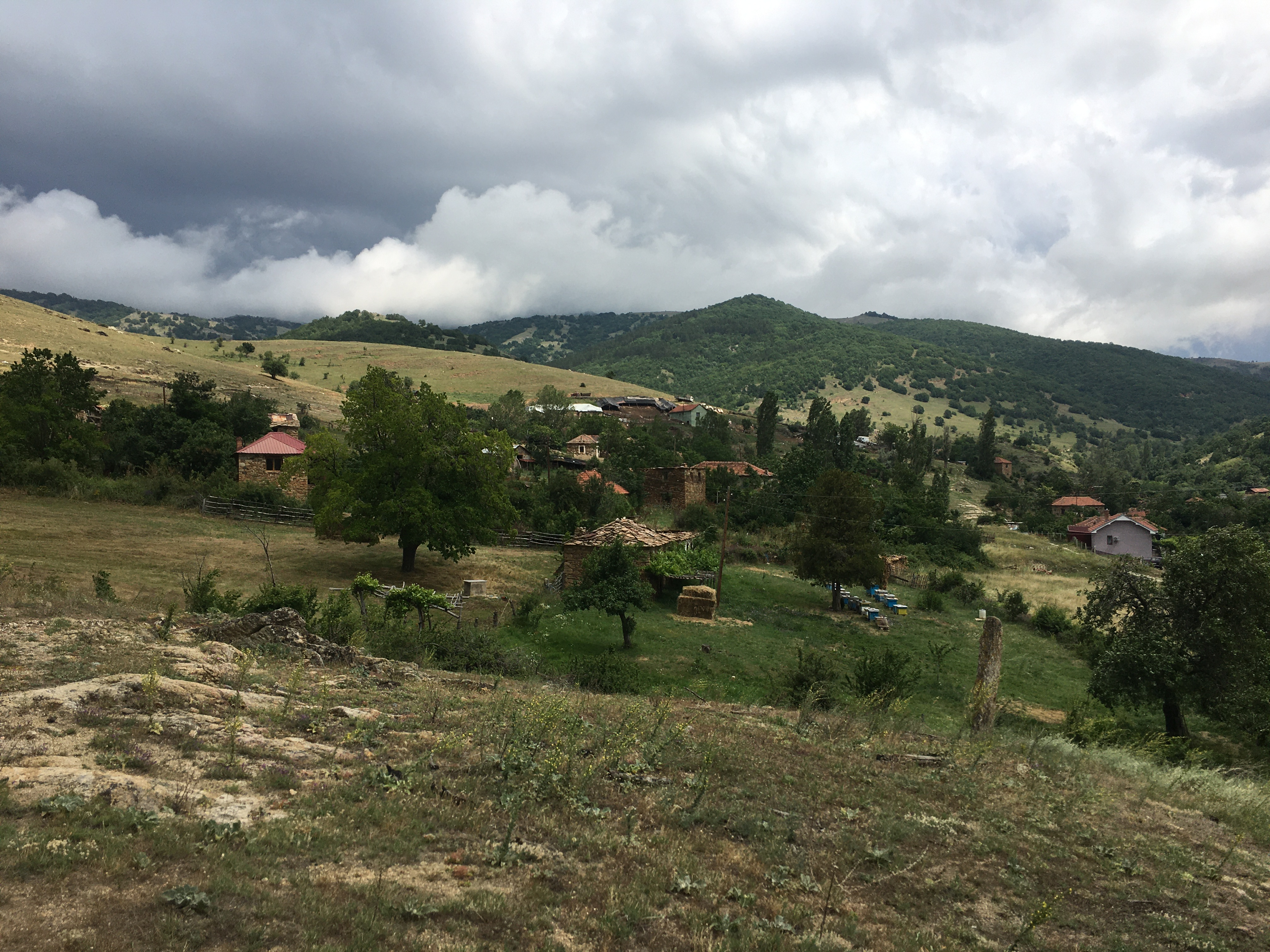
- View of the village

- Location within North Macedonia
- Country: North Macedonia
- Region: Pelagonia
- Municipality: Novaci

Population (2002)
  - Total: 45
- Time zone: UTC+1 (CET)
  - Summer (DST): UTC+2 (CEST)
- Car plates: BT
- Website: .

Dolno Orehovo (Macedonian: Долно Орехово, Albanian: Orehova e Poshtme) is a village in the municipality of Novaci, North Macedonia.

== Demographics ==
According to the 2002 census, the village had a total of 45 inhabitants. Ethnic groups in the village include:

- Macedonians 39
- Albanians 5
- Turks 1
