= Battle of Dobro Pole =

1918 battle in the Balkans Campaign of World War I

- Part of the Vardar offensive in the Balkan Front of World War I
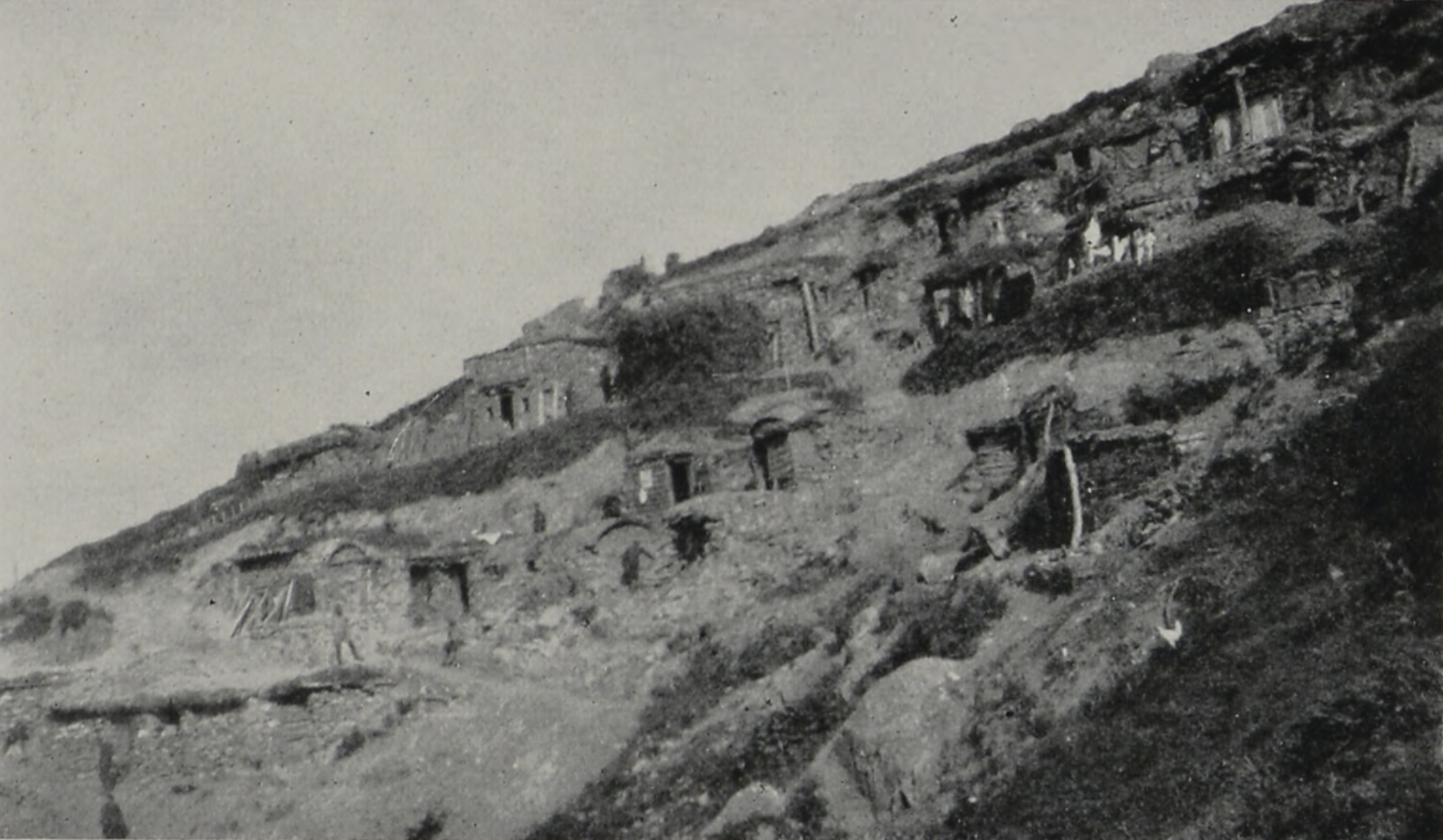
- Ground Cover of the Serbian 21st Infantry Regiment at Dobro Pole (c. 1918)
| Date | 15–18 September 1918 |
| Location | Dobro Pole, Bulgarian-occupied Kingdom of Serbia and Kingdom of Greece (present-day North Macedonia and Greece) 41.035°N 21.885°E |
| Result | Allied victory |

Belligerents
| Allied Powers: France; Serbia; Greece | Central Powers: Bulgaria; Germany |

Commanders and leaders
| (French Third Republic) L. Franchet d'Espèrey; (Kingdom of Serbia) Živojin Mišić; (Kingdom of Serbia) Petar Bojović; (Kingdom of Serbia) Stepa Stepanović; (Kingdom of Greece) Panagiotis Gargalidis | (Tsardom of Bulgaria (1908–1946)) Georgi Todorov; (German Empire) Friedrich von Scholtz |

Units involved
| Allied Army of the Orient; France; 11th Colonial Division; 17th Colonial Division; 122nd Infantry Division; Serbia: 1st Army (Note: The Serbian armies were corps sized formations.); 2nd Army; Greece: Archipelago Division; 3rd Infantry Division; 4th Infantry Division | 11th Army (Note: The 11th German Army consisted of Bulgarian soldiers commanded by German officers.); 2nd Division; 3rd Division |

Strength
| (French Third Republic) 3 divisions; (Kingdom of Serbia) 2 corps; (Kingdom of Greece) 3 divisions; 566 guns | 1 army; 158 artillery pieces |

Casualties and losses
| (French Third Republic) : 1,850 dead; (Kingdom of Serbia) : 200 dead; (Kingdom of Greece) : 158 dead | (Tsardom of Bulgaria (1908–1946)) : 2,689 dead; 3,000 captured; 50 artillery pieces; (German Empire) : Unknown |

The Battle of Dobro Pole (Serbian: Битка код Доброг Поља, romanized: Bitka kod Dobrog Polja; Greek: Μάχη του Ντόμπρο Πόλε, romanized: Máchi tou Dóbro Póle), also known as the Breakthrough at Dobro Pole (Bulgarian: Пробив при Добро Поле, romanized: Probiv pri Dobro Pole), was a World War I battle fought between 15 and 18 September 1918. The battle was fought in the initial stage of the Vardar offensive, in the Balkan Front. On 15 September, a combined force of Serbian, French and Greek troops attacked the Bulgarian-held trenches in Dobro Pole ("Good Field"), at the time part of the Bulgarian-occupied Kingdom of Serbia and the Kingdom of Greece (present-day North Macedonia and Greece). The offensive and the preceding artillery preparation had devastating effects on Bulgarian morale, eventually leading to mass desertions.

Despite being outnumbered and poorly equipped, certain Bulgarian units offered fierce resistance, delaying the Entente advance in Zborsko. However, the collapse of the front line enabled the Allies to assault Bulgarian positions from multiple directions and eventually quell the last pockets of resistance. The Central Powers' defeat at the Dobro Pole played a role in the Bulgarian withdrawal from the war and opened the way for the subsequent capture of Vardar Macedonia.

== Prelude ==
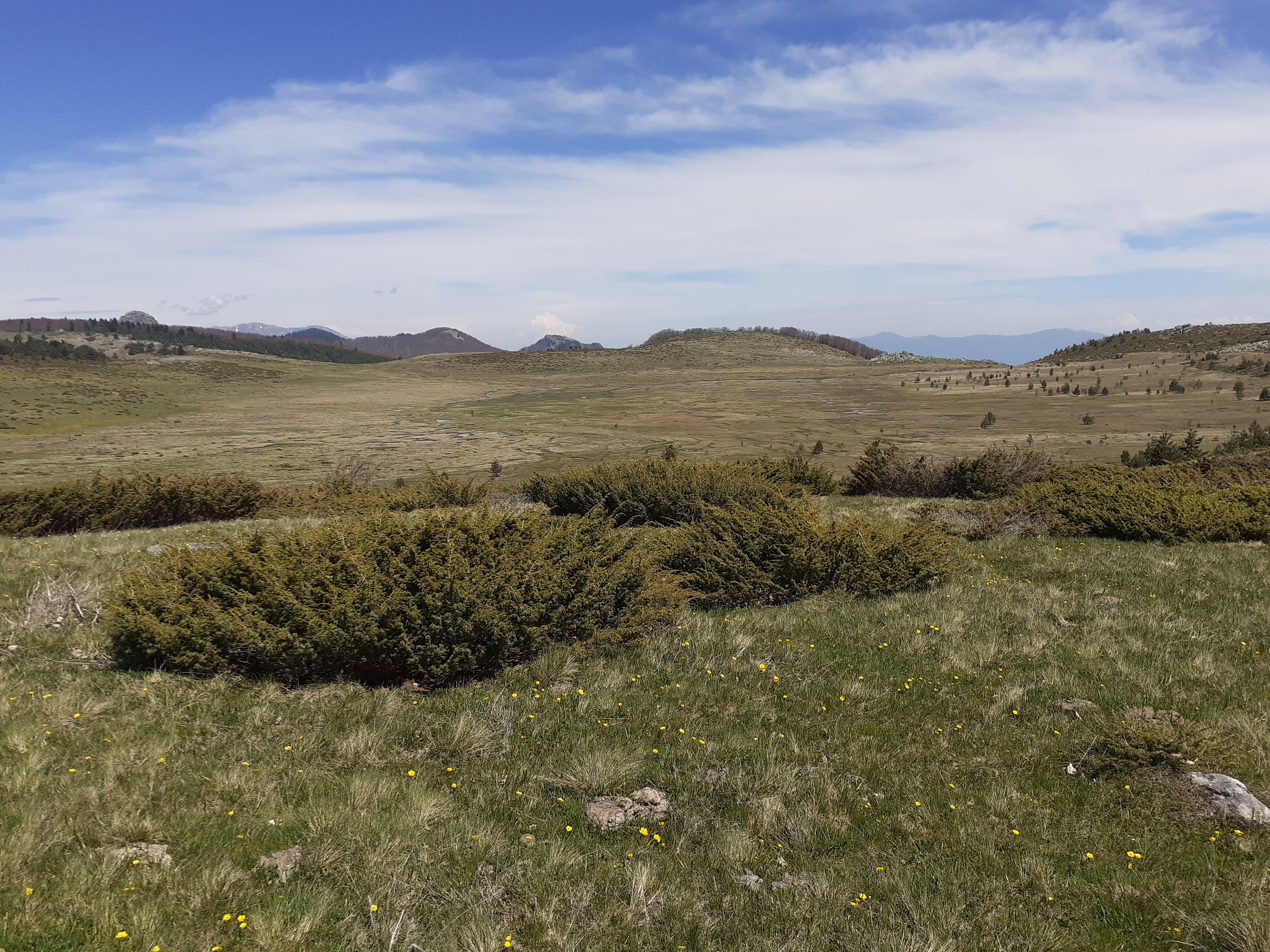
Dobro Pole plateau on Nidže mountain, where the battle and breakthrough took place

The 28 June 1914, assassination of Austro-Hungarian heir presumptive Archduke Franz Ferdinand precipitated Austria-Hungary's declaration of war against Serbia. The conflict quickly attracted the involvement of all major European countries, pitting the Central Powers against the Entente coalition, and starting World War I.

Serbia was ultimately defeated during the autumn 1915 phase of the Serbian campaign, prompting France and Britain to transfer troops from the Gallipoli campaign to Greek Macedonia. The Macedonian front was thus established to support the remnants of the Serbian army in their effort to conquer Vardar Macedonia.

On 17 August 1916, Bulgaria invaded Greece, easily conquering all Greek territory east of the Struma, since the Greek Army was ordered not to resist by the pro-German King Constantine. The surrender of territory recently won with difficulty in the Second Balkan War of 1913 was the last straw for many supporters of Liberal Party politician Eleftherios Venizelos. With Allied assistance, they launched a coup which secured Thessaloniki and most of Greek Macedonia, causing the National Schism. In June 1917, the Venizelists gained full control of the country, immediately declaring war on the Central Powers and joining the Allied Army of the Orient operating on the Balkan Front. The Greek entry into the war, along with the 24 division reinforcements that the army had received in the spring of the same year, created a strategic advantage for the Entente.

In late July 1918, Bulgarian commander-in-chief Nikola Zhekov sent German field marshal general Paul von Hindenburg a message regarding a rumored Entente offensive, and detailed Bulgaria's inability to adequately defend the Vardar portion of the front. Zhekov requested that Germany immediately reinforce the Balkan Front, hinting that Austria-Hungary would also be required to strengthen its positions in Albania. On 17 August, Hindenburg pledged to provide Bulgaria with support only once the situation on other fronts permitted it. Hindenburg's reluctance to support Bulgaria was also manifested by the early September redeployment of the last German Jäger battalion stationed in Macedonia back into Germany.

The Bulgarians, using information from escaped prisoners of war, determined that Entente forces would engage in hostile actions west of lake Ohrid, in Monastir, Dobro Pole or Human. On 27 August, the 2nd and 3rd Bulgarian divisions stationed at Dobro Pole were ordered to make emergency preparations, as new evidence indicated a frontal assault on Dobro Pole along with a secondary attack on Human. By 7 September, Dobro Pole was reinforced by one machine gun company, six battalions and ten heavy howitzers. General Friedrich von Scholtz then stated that these measures made the defense of the front feasible. Von Scholtz had, however, failed to take into account the departure of Bulgarian chief of staff Nikola Zhekov and his subsequent replacement by Georgi Todorov. Widespread insubordination and desertions also plagued the Bulgarian troops, who refused to participate in fortification works. Poor rations and fatigue contributed to the low morale.

A day prior to the Entente offensive, General Louis Franchet d'Espèrey laid out the final plan for the operation. The first phase consisted of a combined Franco-Serbian attack on the positions of the 2nd and 3rd Bulgarian Divisions, which was expected to create a breach of the frontline in the area of Dobro Pole, while also posing a danger to the Bulgarian supply lines on the river Vardar. The 1,875 m (6,152 ft) Dobro Pole ("Good Field") peak dominated the region, providing excellent observation points for the defenders. Dobro Pole was surrounded by a well-developed system of trenches which, in combination with the rough terrain, made the area impassable for wheeled transport. Dobro Pole was, however, lower and less steep than the mountains on other parts of the front that averaged 2,000 m (6,600 ft).

A second Anglo-Franco-Hellenic force would then attack the 1st Bulgarian Army between Kožuf and Lake Doiran, preventing it from forming new defensive positions in the area. The initial advance would allow the Armée d'Orient to progress in support of other units first to Prilep, Disma and Borran. In the meantime, an Anglo-Hellenic force would strike Mount Belasica, occupying the Rupel Pass.

D'Espèrey expected to march the Allied Army of the Orient through the towns of Demir Hisar, Rupel, Petrici, Blagusa, Gradec, Štip and Belessa, finally seizing Skopje. Units stationed at Katsania and Tetovo would prevent a Bulgarian flanking maneuver, while the main body of the force would widen the breach both in Štip and Prilep. In case of a collapse of the front between Dobro Pole and Tzena, the 1st Bulgarian Army and 11th German Army would either be annihilated or, in less favorable circumstances, perform an organised retreat to a new defensive line on the river Crna. The prevention of such a retreat was to be achieved by a rapid, penetrating attack on Gradsko, Dren Planina and Visoka.

== Battle ==
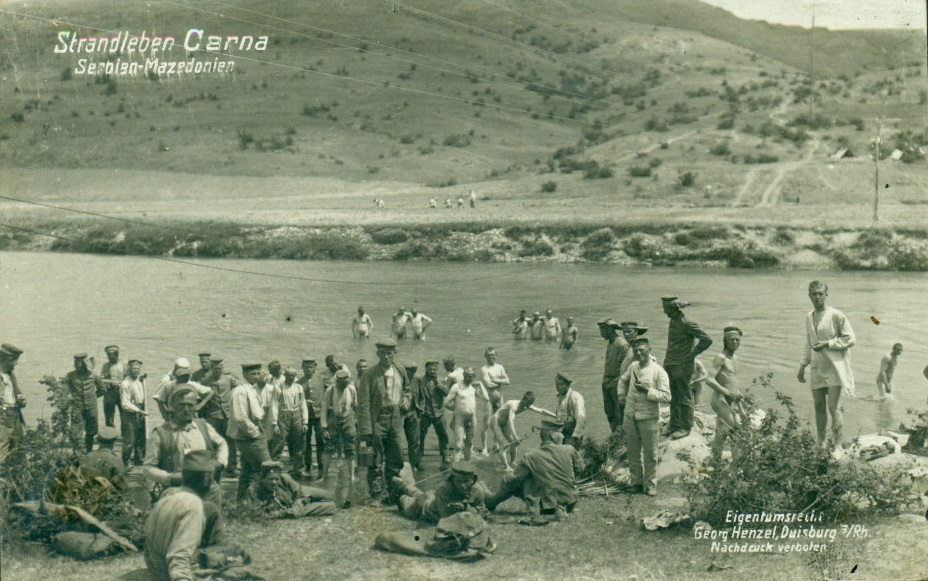
German soldiers bathing in the Crna river in 1918

At 8:00 a.m. on 14 September 1918, Entente forces commenced a 566-gun artillery barrage on enemy positions. Their aircraft also bombed enemy positions and strafed a 250-truck column moving towards Kozjak. On the same day, Scholtz sent Hindenburg a telegraph stating that "all indications point out that an enemy offensive will target the 11th Army on both sides of Vardar as well as Dobro Pole ..." The Bulgarian high command did not attempt to perform a spoiling attack as they lacked the necessary vehicles and pack animals. The barrage did not cause a significant number of casualties but severely affected the Bulgarian esprit de corps. On the night between 14 and 15 September, Franco-Serbian patrols reported that the artillery barrage had dealt sufficient damage to the barbed wire entanglements separating the trenches.

At 5:30 a.m. on 15 September, the French 122nd and 17th (Colonial) divisions struck Sokol, Dobro Pole, Kravitski Kamene and Kravitsa while the Serbian Šumadija Division assaulted Kamene and Veternik. The Greek Archipelago, 3rd and 4th divisions under Panagiotis Gargalidis acted as a link between the Serbian and French troops without entering combat. The offensive immediately caused a wave of mass desertion among the Bulgarian units; the remaining infantrymen and artillery squadrons were not able to hold their ground. During the course of the battle, the 122nd Division broke into two columns and suffered heavy casualties. The left column managed to reach a position located 50 m (160 ft) from Sokol at 6:30 a.m. and take the peak at the end of the day. At 4:00 pm, the right column captured Dobro Pole after rushing a 200 m (660 ft) segment of steep terrain. The 17th Division seized Kravitsa at 7:00 am, suppressing the last signs of resistance.

Two Franco-Greek regiments attempted to storm Zborsko but were pushed back in the ensuing counterattack, as powerful pockets of resistance between the Sousnitsa and Bigrut streams facilitated its defense. Greek units then focused on Sousnitsa the fall of which created an opening in the Bulgarian rear and put the surrounding units to flight. Using dispersed bluffs as cover, soldiers of the Šumadija Division took over Veternik, Kamene and the western part of a nearby mountain range with considerable difficulty. Elements of the same unit successfully flanked Kravitski Kamene while the 17th Division was engaging in a frontal assault. At 4:00 pm, the Serbian 1st Army's thrust on Sokol failed to produce intended results. An attack later that night did secure the peak. The two French divisions were then ordered to remain in position while the Serbian Timok and Yugoslav Divisions moved forward. By the end of the day, Bulgaria lost approximately 40–50 percent of the 12,000 soldiers involved in the battle, including 3,000 prisoners of war, 2,689 dead and 50 out of the initial 158 artillery pieces. Entente casualties amounted to 1,700 Frenchmen and 200 Serbians killed in action.

On the morning of 16 September, the Serbians overran the Kozjak mountain range and the Golo Bilo peak. They were joined by the 35th Greek Regiment which crossed the Poroi River and later marched on Topolets. At 11:00 am, Franco-Hellenic units stormed Zborsko for a second time and were met by heavy artillery and machine gun fire. The attack was rebuffed with the loss of 158 Greeks and roughly the same number of French lives and attempts to take the area were suspended. Živojin Mišić's 1st Army and the Armée d'Orient performed a night attack on the Gradešnica fortified zone, suppressing the defenders. The 1st Division Group moved into a position on the Poroi River north of Brahovo in conjunction with the Timok Division. By the night of 16 September, the gap in what formerly constituted the front line had extended to 25 km (16 mi) in width and 7 km (4.3 mi) in depth. The Allied command ordered its air department to continue attacking all bridges on the river Vardar.

At 4.00 a.m. on 17 September, Hellenic components of the 1st Division Group raided Mount Preslap, a key position housing Bulgarian artillery. The Greeks rapidly descended from Golo Bilo and then began climbing the cliffs of Preslap with their bare hands. The Preslap garrison proceeded to abandon their positions and retreat eastwards. Having lost their artillery cover forces at Zborsko followed their comrades in retreat. The Timok Division conquered Topolets and advanced towards Studena Voda and Preslap while the Morava and Yugoslav divisions overran Koutskov Kamene. At the same time, the Drina and Danube Divisions seized Gradešnica along with the Poltsista and Besistsa peaks, then halted at Melinitsa.

On 18 September, the 11th French Colonial Division and the 6th Greek Regiment occupied the villages of Zoviḱ, Staravina and Cebren, approaching towards the Cebren Monastery bridge on the Crna. An Entente air raid destroyed another bridge north of Razim Bey. Bulgarian forces failed to put a stop to the Allied offensive, abandoning their wounded and large quantities of military equipment. By the end of the day, Allied troops had advanced 15 km (9.3 mi) into enemy territory while also seizing locales of tactical importance that would later enable them to continue pushing deeper into Vardar Macedonia.

== Aftermath ==
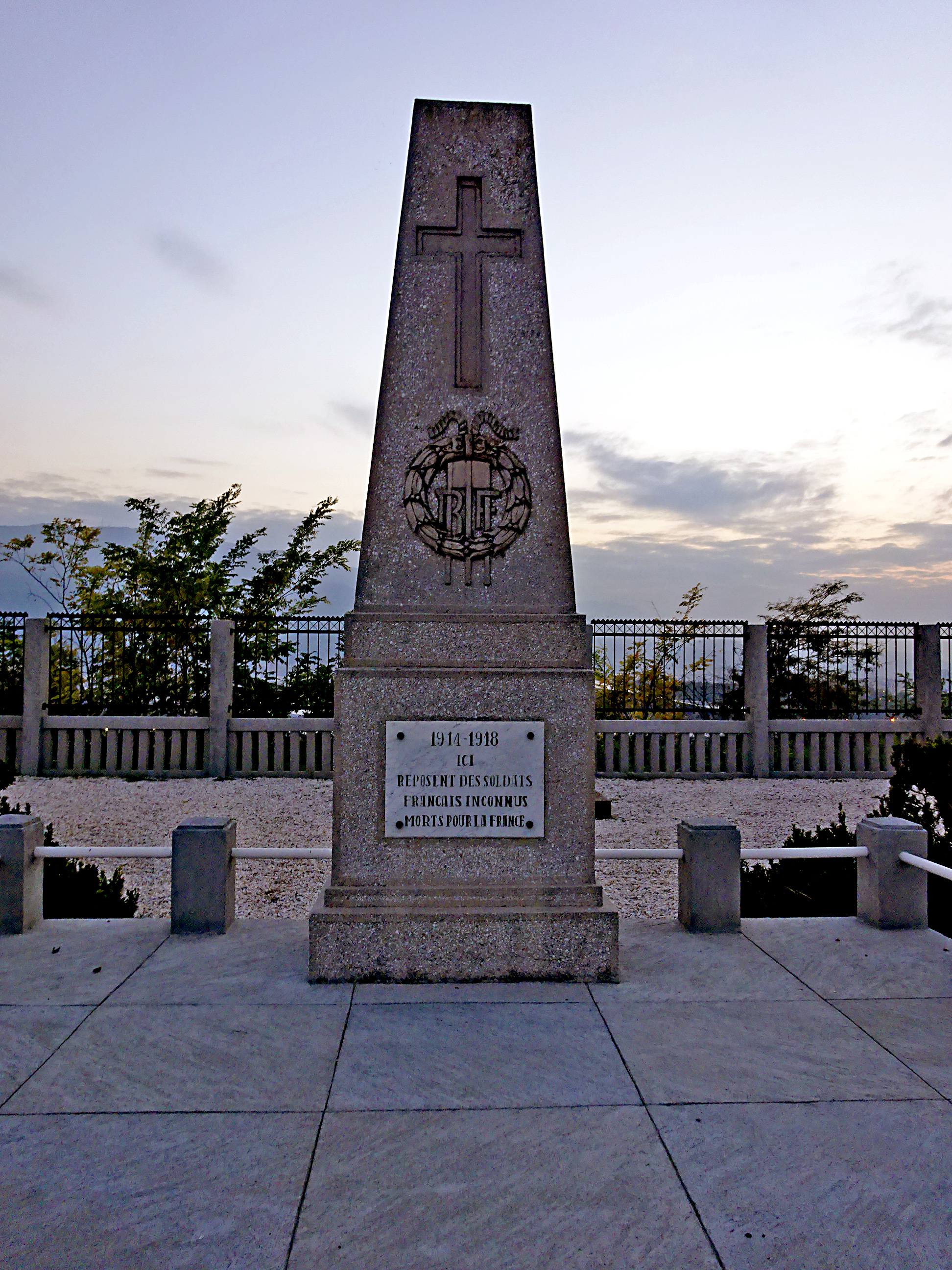
French military cemetery in Skopje

Immediately following the battle, Entente forces were defeated in the Battle of Doiran at Lake Doiran on 18 September. However, the breach of the defensive line at Dobro Pole enabled the Allies to penetrate into Vardar Macedonia and send reinforcements to Doiran. The Bulgarians rushed to the defense of their homeland, abandoning Vardar Macedonia, in order to prevent a future occupation by the Entente. Having suffered many losses at Doiran, the Allied forces allowed the Bulgarians to peacefully withdraw over the border. A combination of factors, including combat fatigue and poor supplies, led to the Radomir Rebellion. On 25 September, a band of Bulgarian deserters who had previously fled from Dobro Pole arrived at Kyustendil, looting the city and putting the Bulgarian High Command to flight. The mass of retreating Bulgarian mutineers then converged on the railway center of Radomir in Bulgaria, just 30 mi (48 km) from the capital city of Sofia. On 27 September, the leaders of the Bulgarian Agrarian National Union took control of these troops and proclaimed the establishment of the Bulgarian Republic. About 4,000–5,000 rebellious troops threatened Sofia the following day.

Under those chaotic circumstances, a Bulgarian delegation arrived in Thessaloniki to ask for an armistice. On 29 September, the Bulgarians were granted the Armistice of Salonica by General d'Esperey. The Bulgarian downfall turned the strategic and operational balance of the war against the Central Powers. The new balance was best described by the German Emperor, Wilhelm II, in his telegram to Tsar Ferdinand I "Disgraceful! 62,000 Serbs decided the war!".

The Macedonian Front was brought to an end at noon on 30 September, when the ceasefire came into effect, and the Radomir Rebellion was put down, by Bulgarian forces, as of 2 October. Tsar Ferdinand I of Bulgaria abdicated and went into exile the following day. On 29 September 1918, the German Supreme Army Command informed Kaiser Wilhelm II and the Imperial Chancellor Count Georg von Hertling, that the military situation facing Germany was hopeless.

The British Army headed east towards the European side of the Ottoman Empire, while the French and Serbian forces continued north. The British Army neared Constantinople and, without a force capable of stopping the advance, the Ottoman government asked for an armistice (the Armistice of Mudros) on 26 October. In Serbia, "Desperate Frankie" (as the British nicknamed d'Esperey) continued to advance and the Serbo-French Army re-captured the country, overrunning several weak German divisions that tried to block its push near Niš. On 3 November, Austria-Hungary was forced to sign the Armistice of Villa Giusti on the Italian Front ending the war there. On 10 November, d'Esperey's army crossed the Danube river and was poised to enter the Hungarian heartland. At the request of the French general, Count Mihály Károlyi, leading the Hungarian government, signed the Armistice of Belgrade.

== See also ==
- Treaty of Neuilly-sur-Seine
- Kingdom of Yugoslavia
