= Budimirci =

Budimirci Будимирци
- Village
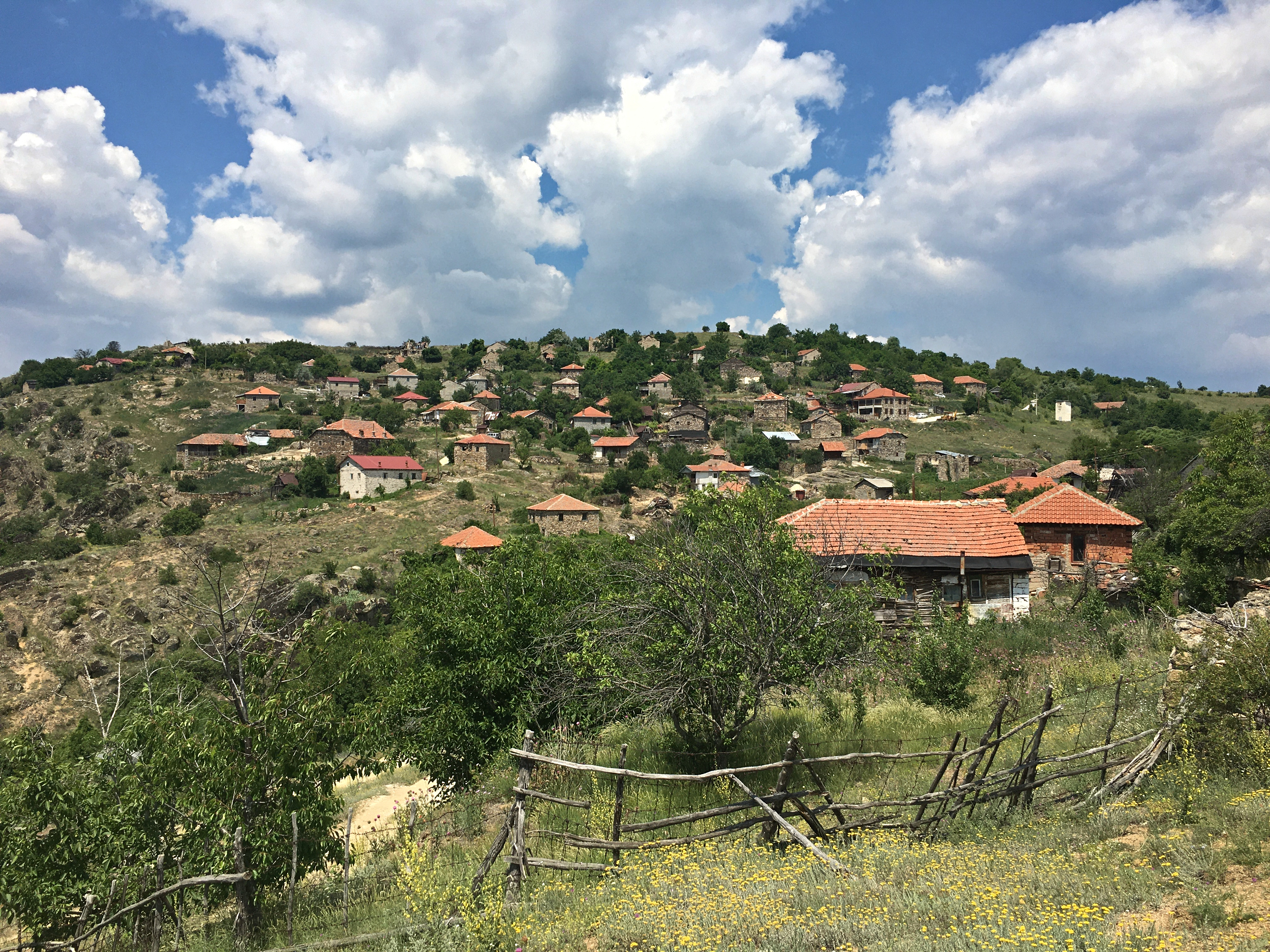
- View of the village

- Location within North Macedonia
- Country: North Macedonia
- Region: Pelagonia
- Municipality: Novaci

Population (2002)
  - Total: 30
- Time zone: UTC+1 (CET)
  - Summer (DST): UTC+2 (CEST)
- Car plates: BT
- Website: .

Budimirci (Macedonian: Будимирци) is a small village in the Mariovo region, in the municipality of Novaci, North Macedonia. It used to be part of the former municipality of Staravina.

== Demographics ==
According to the 2002 census, the village had a total of 30 inhabitants. Ethnic groups in the village include:

- Macedonians 30
