= Beleštevica =

Beleštevica Белештевица Beleshtevicë
- Village
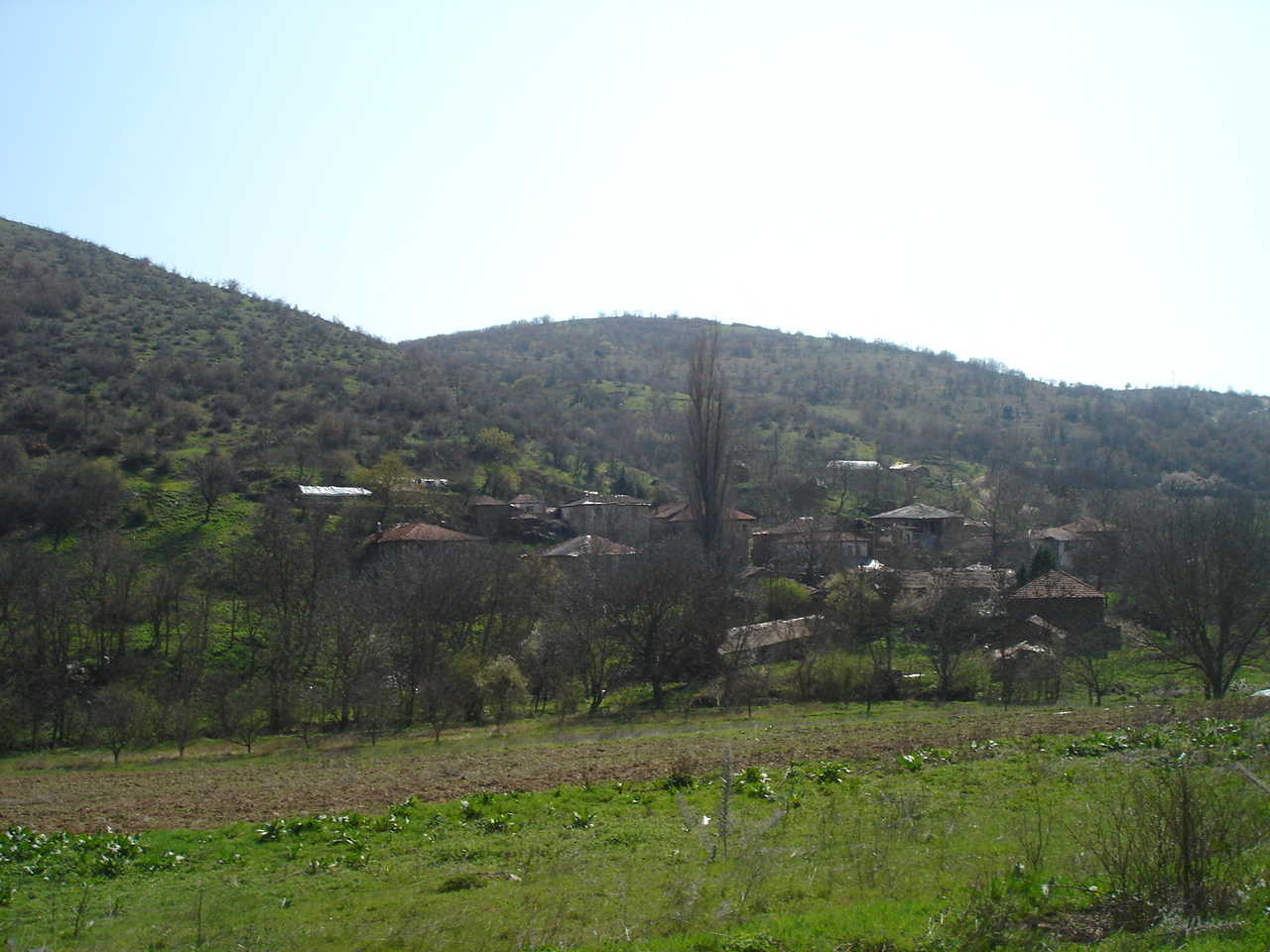

- Location within North Macedonia
- Coordinates: 41°45′47″N 21°41′53″E
- Country: North Macedonia
- Region: Vardar
- Municipality: Veles

Population (2002)
  - Total: 4
- Time zone: UTC+1 (CET)
  - Summer (DST): UTC+2 (CEST)
- Car plates: VE
- Website: .

Beleštevica (Macedonian: Белештевица, Albanian: Beleshtevicë) is a village in the municipality of Veles, North Macedonia.

== Demographics ==
According to the 2021 census, the village had a total of 4 inhabitants. Ethnic groups in the village include:

- Macedonians 2
- Albanians 2
