= Kremenica, North Macedonia =

Kremenica Кременица Kınalı
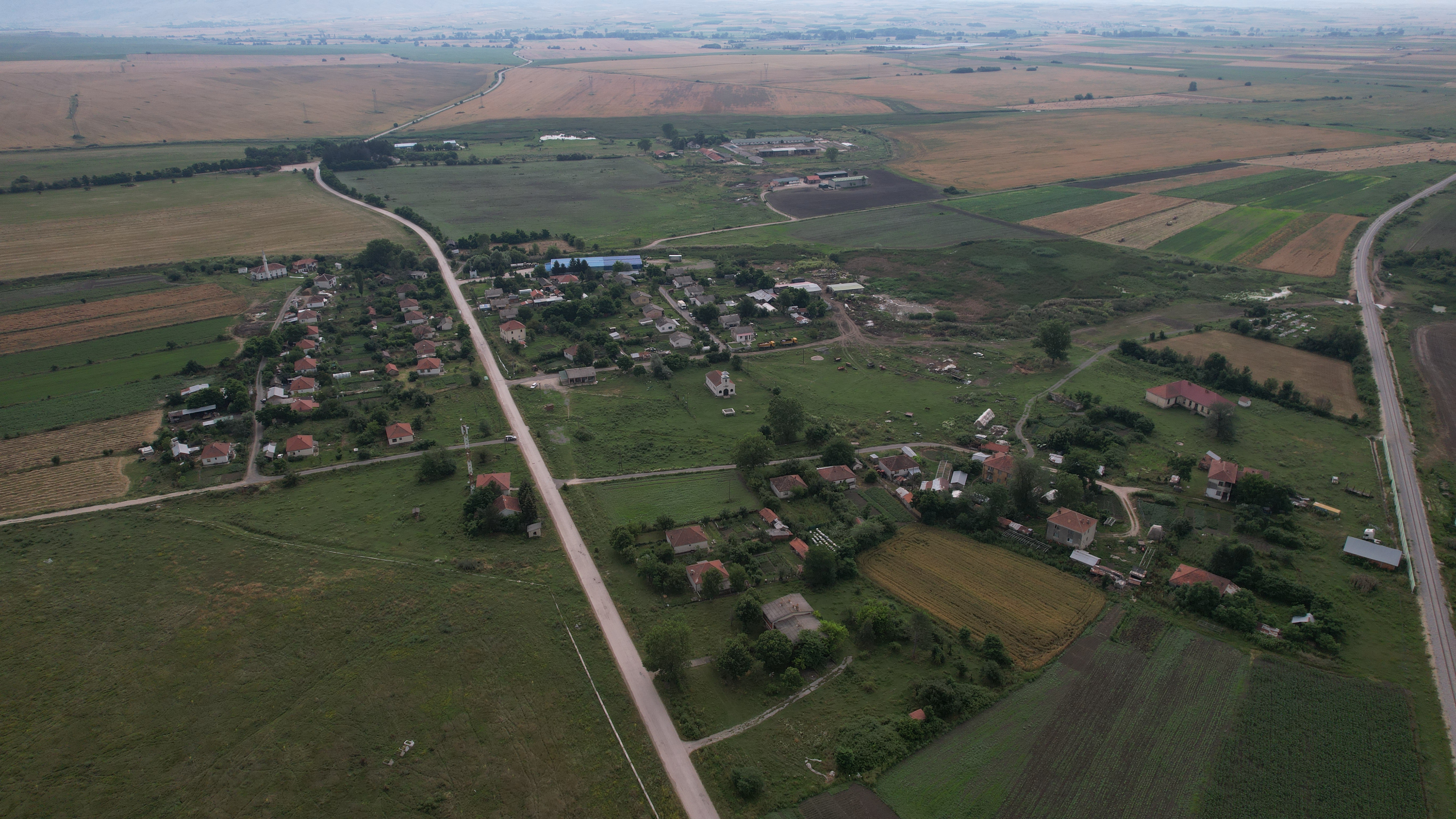
- Air view of the village

- Location within North Macedonia
- Coordinates: 40°55′25″N 21°27′32″E
- Country: North Macedonia
- Region: Pelagonia
- Municipality: Bitola
- Elevation: 585 m (1,919 ft)

Population (2002)
  - Total: 134
- Time zone: UTC+1 (CET)
  - Summer (DST): UTC+2 (CEST)
- Postal code: 7223
- Area code: +389 047
- Car plates: BT
- Website: .

Kremenica (Macedonian: Кременица), formerly Kenali (Macedonian: Кенали, Turkish: Kınalı) is a village in the Bitola Municipality of North Macedonia. It used to be part of the former municipality of Bistrica.

== History ==
In the early Ottoman period, Kenali was one of several villages in the Pelagonia plain settled by nomadic Turkomen tribes from Anatolia during 1475–1543. Following the end of Ottoman rule, the Balkan Wars (1912–1913) and the difficult living circumstances which emerged, Turks from Kenali migrated to Turkey and settled in the towns of Gazeller and Tekeler in Sakarya province. In Turkey, Turkish villagers have kept some of their customs from their former homeland.

== Demographics ==
According to the 2002 census, the village had a total of 134 inhabitants. Ethnic groups in the village include:

- Macedonians 112
- Turks 20
- Serbs 1
- Others 1
