= Makovo, North Macedonia =

Makovo Маково Manovo, Masovo
- Village
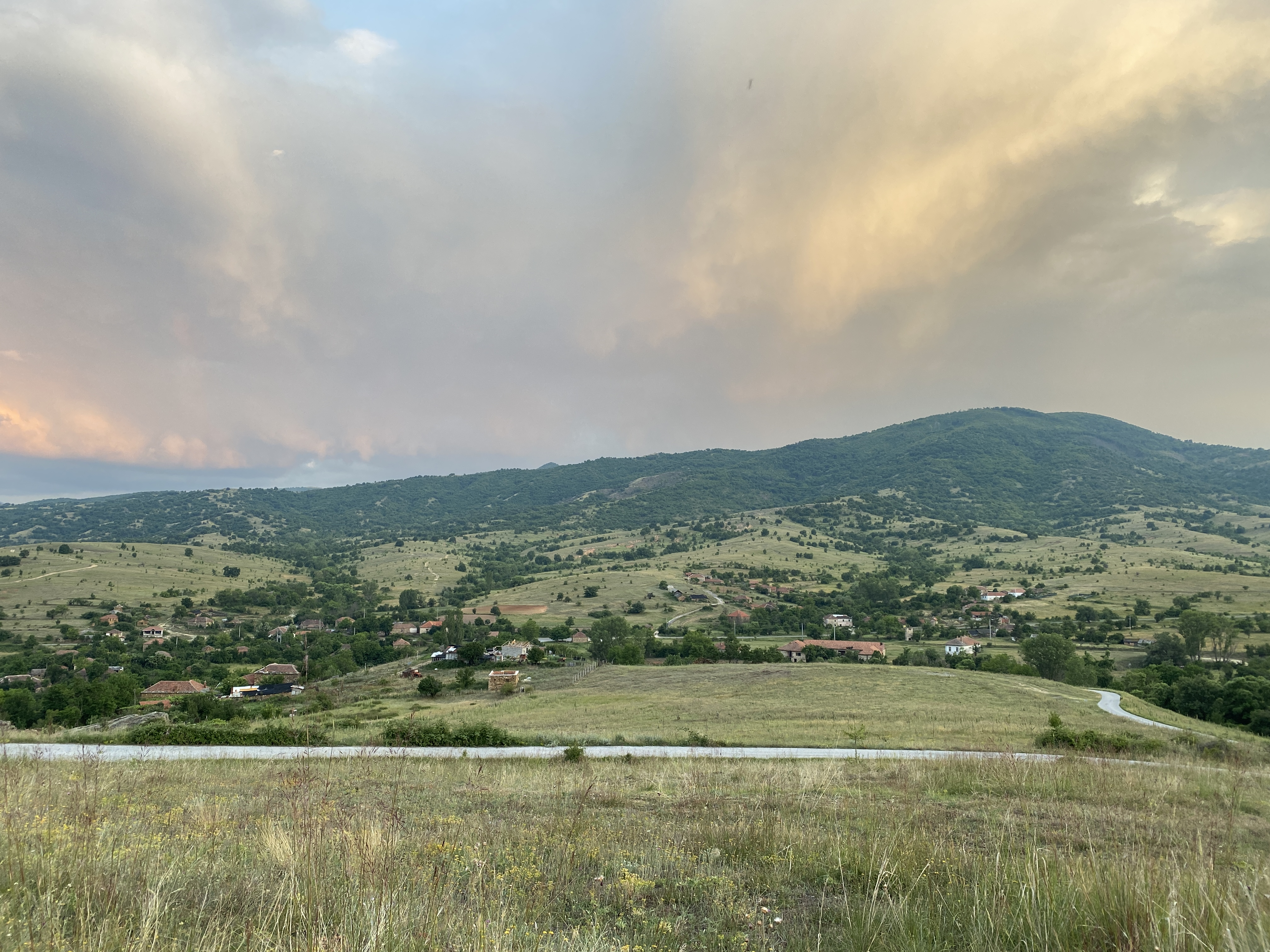
- View of the village

- Location within North Macedonia
- Coordinates: 41°07′05″N 021°36′32″E
- Country: North Macedonia
- Region: Pelagonia
- Municipality: Novaci

Population (2002)
  - Total: 71
- Time zone: UTC+1 (CET)
  - Summer (DST): UTC+2 (CEST)
- Postal code: 7213
- Area code: 047

Makovo (Macedonian: Маково; Manovo, Masovo) is a village in the mountains of the municipality of Novaci, in the Mariovo region of North Macedonia. It used to be part of the former municipality of Staravina.

== Demographics ==
According to the 2002 census, the village had a total of 71 inhabitants. Ethnic groups in the village include:

- Macedonians 71
