= Stefan Tasev =

Bulgarian major general (born 1866)

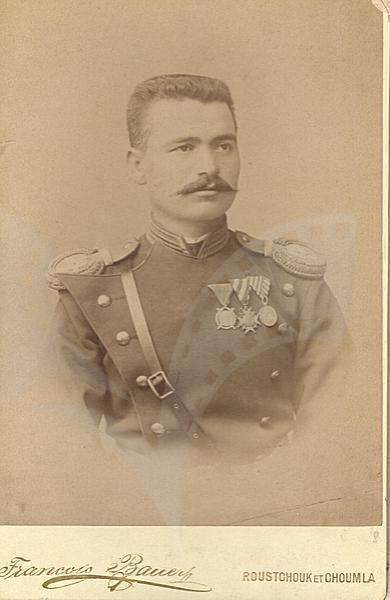
- Born: 17 November 1866; Gorna Oryahovitsa, Danube Vilayet, Ottoman Empire
- Died: Unknown
- Military career
- Allegiance: Principality of Bulgaria; Kingdom of Bulgaria
- Branch: Bulgarian Land Forces
- Service years: 1885 – 1920?
- Commands: 7th Rila Infantry Division; 1st Infantry Division
- Conflicts: First Balkan War; Bulgarian front; Second Balkan War; World War I; Battle of Malka Nidzhe

Stefan Tasev was a Bulgarian officer, major general of infantry, Head of 7th Rila Infantry Division in World War I and after the war commanded the 1st Infantry Division in Sofia.

== Biography ==
Stefan Tasev was born on 17 November 1866 in Gorna Oryahovitsa. On 6 June 1884 he enlisted in the Bulgarian Land Forces. In 1885 he graduated from the Military School of His Princely Highness in Sofia, and on 21 December he was promoted to the rank of lieutenant and enlisted in the infantry. On 17 June 1888 he was promoted to the rank of lieutenant, and in 1892 to the rank of captain. In 1900 he served as a senior officer in the Vasil Levski National Military University, and from 1903 he was company commander in the same. On 2 August 1903 he was promoted to the rank of major, and on 13 May 1908 to the rank of lieutenant colonel. In 1909 he was appointed chief of a Regimental Military District, and from 1911 was commander of the 26th Pernik Regiment.

== Balkan Wars ==
During the First Balkan War, Stefan Tasev served as commander of the 12th Infantry Regiment, and on 18 May 1913 was promoted to colonel.

On 9 March 1914 he was appointed head of the Vasil Levski National Military University, a position he held until 10 September 1915.

== World War I ==
During World War I, Tasev was head of the 7th Rila Infantry Division from 29 June 1917 to 30 September 1918. On 15 August 1917 he was promoted to the rank of Major General In 1918 he was chief of the occupation troops in the Moravian region. After the war, he was appointed head of the 1st Infantry Division in Sofia. In 1919 he joined the reserves.

On 25 June 1920 he was appointed Assistant Director General of Labor, and 3 days later took office.

== Awards ==
- Order of Bravery, III degree, 2nd class
- Order of Saint Alexander, III and IV degree with swords in the middle
- Order of Military Merit, 5th class on a plain ribbon

== Bibliography ==
- Nedev, S., The Command of the Bulgarian Army during the Wars of National Unification, Sofia, 1993, Military Publishing Complex "St. George the Victorious ”, p. 178
- Yotov, Petko, Dobrev, Angel, Milenov, Blagoy. The Bulgarian Army in the First World War (1915 - 1918): A Short Encyclopedic Reference Book, Sofia, Publishing House "St. George the Victorious", 1995
