= Christos Tsolakopoulos =

Greek Hellenic Army officer

- Xρήστος Τσολακόπουλος
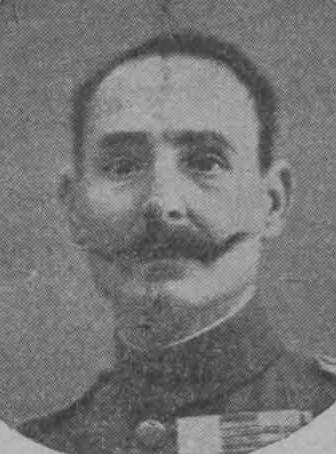
- Tsolakopoulos in the late 1910s
- Born: 1 January 1868; Epidavros
- Died: 1923; Nafplio, Kingdom of Greece
- Military career
- Allegiance: Kingdom of Greece
- Branch: Hellenic Army
- Service years: 1886–1920
- Rank: Major General
- Nicknames: Rembelos; Ρέμπελος
- Commands: 35th Infantry Regiment
- Wars: Greco-Turkish War (1897); Macedonian Struggle; Balkan Wars; First Balkan War; Siege of Ioannina (WIA); Second Balkan War; Battle of Kilkis-Lachanas; World War I; Macedonian front; Russian Civil War; Allied intervention in the Russian Civil War; Southern Front; Southern Russia Intervention
- Other work: Member of the HMC

Christos Tsolakopoulos (Greek: Xρήστος Τσολακόπουλος, 1868–1923) was a Hellenic Army officer.

== Life ==
Tsolakopoulos was born on 1 January 1868 in Epidavros. He enlisted in the Hellenic Army as a volunteer on 15 August 1886. While a student at the NCO School, he participated in the Greco-Turkish War of 1897. On 9 August 1899 he graduated from the NCO School as an Infantry 2nd Lieutenant. In 1905, during the early stages of the Macedonian Struggle, he led an armed band in the area of Morihovo with the nom de guerre of Kapetan Rembelos (Καπετάν Ρέμπελος).

During the Balkan Wars of 1912–13 he fought as an officer in the 8th Infantry Regiment, and was wounded in the siege of Ioannina. He particularly distinguished himself during the Battle of Kilkis–Lachanas in the Second Balkan War. Serving as adjutant of the regimental commander, Col. Kambanis, he concealed the Colonel's death from the troops and took over command of the regiment until the end of the battle. In 1917–18 he served as commander of the 35th Infantry Regiment at the Strymon sector of the Macedonian front. In 1919 he participated with his regiment in the Allied intervention in Ukraine, landing at Odessa.

He retired in 1920 with the rank of Colonel, and engaged in politics in town of Nafplio. Upon his death in 1923, the Greek government promoted him to the rank of Major General.
