= Gradešnica =

Gradešnica Градешница
- Village
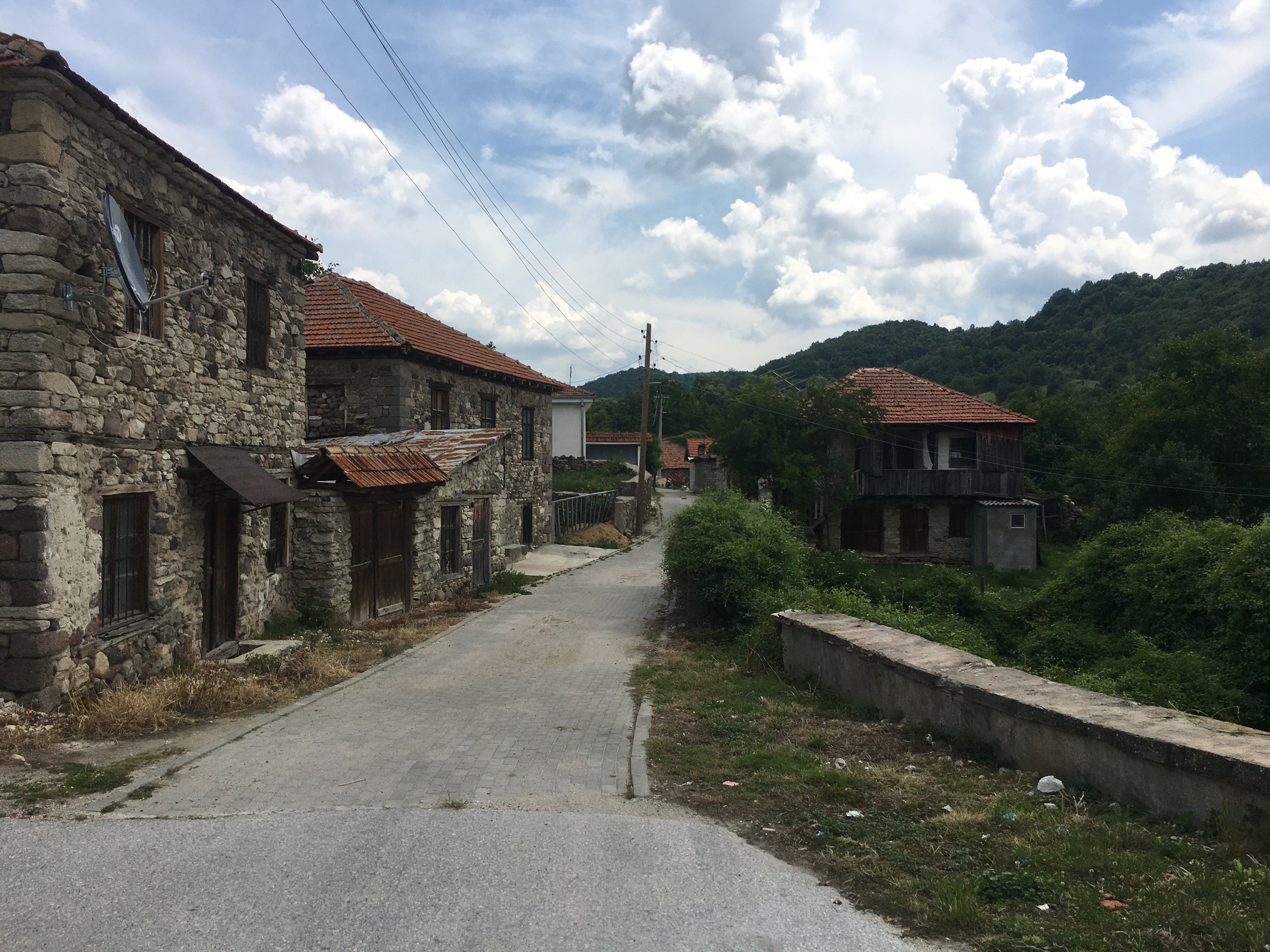
- Street in the village

- Location within North Macedonia
- Coordinates: 41°05′06″N 021°45′48″E
- Country: North Macedonia
- Region: Pelagonia
- Municipality: Novaci
- Elevation: 953 m (3,127 ft)

Population (2002)
  - Total: 89
- Time zone: UTC+1 (CET)
  - Summer (DST): UTC+2 (CEST)
- Area code: 047

Gradešnica (Macedonian: Градешница) is a village in the Municipality of Novaci of North Macedonia, located in the northwestern foothills of the Voras Mountains. It used to be part of the former municipality of Staravina.

== History ==
Gradešnica and the surrounding area was caught in the middle of major military action during World War I. The Macedonian front passed through the area and the decisive Battle of Dobro Pole took place nearby.

== Demographics ==
According to Ethnographie des Vilayets D'Andrinople, de Monastir, et de Salonique, published in Constantinople in 1878, the village had a total of 94 households with 415 male inhabitants.

According to the 2002 census, the village had a total of 89 inhabitants. Ethnic groups in the village include:

- Macedonians 88
- Turks 1

== People from Gradešnica ==
- Traianos Nallis, Greek notable and politician
- Traian Stoianovich, American historian who specialized in the history of the Balkans
