= Novaci Municipality =

Municipality of North Macedonia

Coordinates: 41.04°N 21.45°E

Municipality of Novaci Општина Новаци
- Municipality
- Flag

- Country: North Macedonia
- Region: Pelagonia
- Municipal seat: Novaci

Government
  - Mayor: Stevče Stevanovski (VMRO-DPMNE)

Area
  - Total: 753.53 km^{2} (290.94 sq mi)

Population
  - Total: 2,648
- Time zone: UTC+1 (CET)
- Vehicle registration: BT

Novaci (Macedonian: Новаци) is a municipality in the southern part of North Macedonia. Novaci is also the name of the village where the municipal seat is found. Novaci Municipality is a part of the Pelagonia Statistical Region.

REK Bitola, the organizational unit of North Macedonia's key energy company Elektrani na Severna Makedonija is located within the municipality's territory; the power plant and coal mines Suvodol and Brod-Gneotino.

== History ==
In the 2003 territorial division of North Macedonia, the rural municipalities of Bač and Staravina were merged with Novaci Municipality.

== Demographics ==
According to the 2021 North Macedonia census, this municipality has 2,648 inhabitants. Ethnic groups in the municipality include:

	2002		2021	
	Number	%	Number	%
TOTAL	3,549	100	2,648	100
Macedonians	3,490	98.34	2,427	91.65
Albanians	21	0.59	46	1.74
Serbs	7	0.2	4	0.15
Turks	27	0.76	1	0.04
Vlachs	1	0.03		
Other / Undeclared / Unknown	3	0.08	16	0.6
Persons for whom data are taken from administrative sources			154	5.82

== Inhabited places ==
- Armatuš
- Bač
- Biljanik
- Bladovenci
- Brnik
- Brod
- Budimirci
- Dalbegovci
- Dobromiri
- Dobroveni
- Dolno Aglarci
- Dolno Orehovo
- Germijan
- Gneotino
- Gnileš
- Gorno Aglarci
- Gradešnica
- Grumaži
- Gruništa
- Iveni
- Makovo
- Meglenci
- Novaci (seat)
- Novo Selo
- Orle
- Paralovo
- Petalino
- Rapeš
- Polog
- Ribarci
- Skočivir
- Slivica
- Sovik
- Staravina
- Suvo Dol
- Tepavci
- Veleselo
- Vranjevci
- Zovig
- Zoviḱ
- Živojno

== Twin municipalities ==
- Albania, Pustec Municipality
- Bulgaria, Borovan
- Croatia, Dugi Rat
- Slovenia, Municipality of Hrpelje-Kozina
- Hungary, Farmos
- Greece, Koufalia
