= Staravina =

Staravina Старавина
- Village
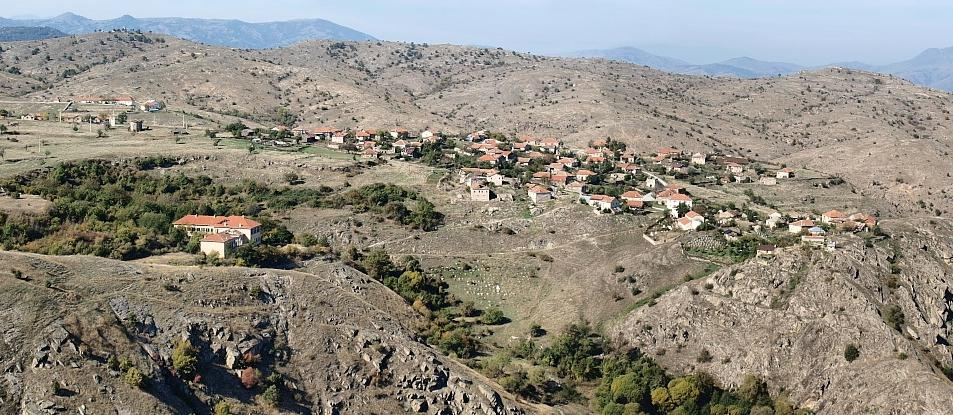

- Location within North Macedonia
- Coordinates: 41°05′23″N 21°44′00″E
- Country: North Macedonia
- Region: Pelagonia
- Municipality: Novaci

Population (2002)
  - Total: 23
- Time zone: UTC+1 (CET)
  - Summer (DST): UTC+2 (CEST)

Staravina (Macedonian: Старавина) is a small village in the municipality of Novaci, North Macedonia. It used to be a municipality of its own and its FIPS code was MK95.

== Demographics ==
According to the 2002 census, the village had a total of 23 inhabitants. Ethnic groups in the village include:

- Macedonians 22
- Serbs 1
