= 156th Infantry Division (France) =

- Active: 1915–1919
- Country: France
- Branch: French Army
- Engagements: Second Battle of Krithia; Battle of the River Cherna; Battle of Monastir (1917); Battle of Skra-di-Legen; fr:Manœuvre d'Uskub

Commanders
- Notable commanders: Maurice Bailloud

156th Infantry Division was an infantry division of the French Army during the First World War. It was deployed overseas, seeing action during the Gallipoli campaign, and thereafter on the Salonika front, fighting alongside British troops in both theatres of war. It was sent to the Crimea in December 1918 as part of the Army of the Danube.

== Creation and nomenclature ==
- 17 March 1915 : Creation of the 156th Infantry Division
- 29 April 1915 : Takes the name of 2nd Infantry Division of the Corps expéditionnaire d'Orient
- 15 October 1915 : Reverts to the designation of 156th Infantry Division

== Commanders ==
- 16 March 1915 : General Maurice Bailloud
- 26 August 1916 – 1 May 1918 : General Baston
- 11 June 1919 – 12 October 1919 : General Dufieux

== Chronology ==
=== 1915 ===
- 2 May - 7 August 1915: until 20 May, transport by sea to Cape Helles by the liner SS France (1910) (converted during wartime into a troopship). From 6 May, as its units landed, engaged in the Battle of Krithia: took part, on May 6th, 7th and 8th, 1915, in the 1st engagement of Kéréves Déré; 4, 21 and 30 June, fought in the 2nd, 3rd and 4th engagements of Kéréves Déré; 12 and 13 July, present in the 5th engagement of Kéréves Déré. From 13 July, preparations for the offensive.
- 7 August - 1 October: fought in the 6th engagement of Kéréves Déré; then took up positions in the French sector.
- 1 October - 9 December: evacuation of the Gallipoli peninsula; transported to Salonika. From 14 October, occupation, on the Serbian-Bulgarian border, of a sector northeast of Guevgheli (Gevgelija):

21 October: seizure of Rabrovo; local actions 22 and 23 October.
3 - 12 November: offensive towards Strumica; progression to Kosturino, thereafter fortification and the defence of the captured positions.

- 9–16 December: retreat to Salonika:

9th, 10th and 11th December: defence of Boyimia, Fourka and Chernitsa positions. Then retreat movement in two columns, towards Kilindir (Kalindria in the municipal unit of Cherso) and Karasouli (Polykastro).

- 16 December 1915 - 5 May 1916: establishment of the entrenched camp of Salonika, between Kiorziné (Xirochori) and Dogandji (Prochoma). From 20 March, elements detached 15 kilometres north of Kiorziné (entrenching work, then, from 18 April, occupation of the Kilindir front, Lake Ardzan).

=== 1916 ===
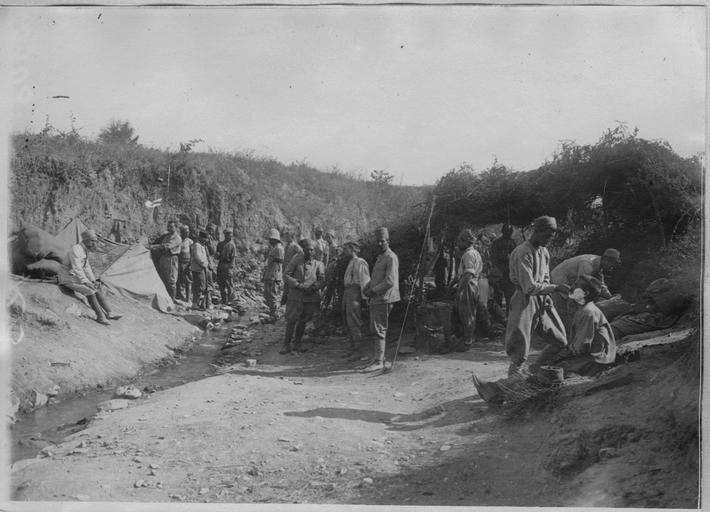
Zouaves of the 156th Division in the ravine of Hill 420 in the Cugunci sector, July 1916.

- 5 May - 29 July: established positions on the (Kalindria) Kilindir front, Lake Ardzan (by the entire division).
- 29 July – 31 August: relief by British elements. Regrouping south of Bohemitsa (Axioupoli); preparations for an offensive (elements engaged towards Lioumnitsa (Skra, Kilkis)). From 21 August, transported by the Kodza Déré Decauville Railway in the Veria region, Ostrovo.
- 31 August 1916 – 2 January 1917: participation in the allied Monastir offensive : until 31 August, grouping of the division south of Lake Ostrovo (fighting near Nalbandkeui). From 12 September, offensive; on the 15th, crossing the Malka, towards Aitos (Aetos, Florina); the 17th occupation of Florina; then took up positions in a sector facing the Verbéni front (Itea, Florina), Arménohor (Armenochori, Greece).

From 30 October, pursuit of the enemy to the Kenali (sh:Kremenica (Bitolj)) lines and attacks.
From 15 November, new enemy withdrawal up to 6 kilometres south of Monastir (Bitola), then 19 November to the north of the city. Established and defended positions in a sector, 3 kilometres north of Monastir (Battle of the River Cherna).

=== 1917 ===
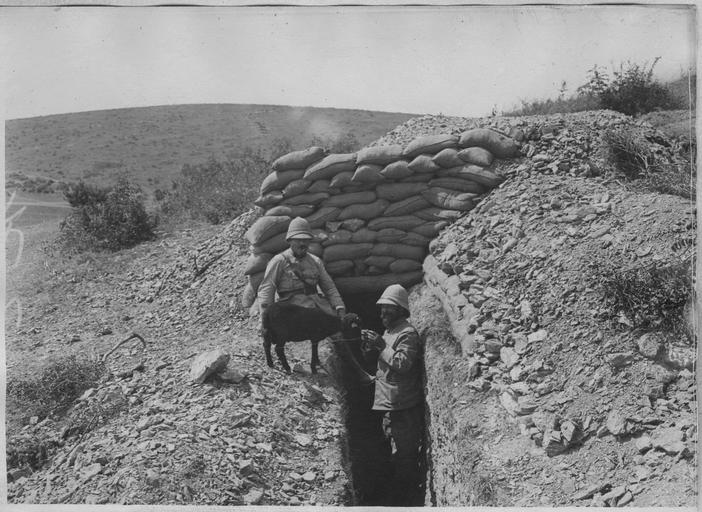
Two officers posing with a zouave battalion mascot at the entrance to a shell-proof dugout at Hill 420 in the Cugunci sector

- 2 January - 13 March: occupation of a new sector between the stream of Bratin Dol, Ternova and the ridge of Baba Planina. Elements of the division (176th Infantry) seconded to Albania.
- 13 March 13–1 June: engaged in the Battle of Monastir (1917): attacks from enemy positions towards Péristéri and Tservéna Sténa; advance west of Ternova; on 26 March new attack towards Tservéna Sténa; then fortification of the captured positions:

17 April: violent enemy attack in the direction of Dihovo.
19 April: French counter-attack.

- 1 June - 25 July 25: occupation of the Dihovo region, Lake Prespa.
- 25 July 1917 – 7 January 1918: withdrawal from the front. Movement by successive elements towards the region of Negovani (Flampouro, Florina), Léskovéts (Leskoec). In September and October 1917, elements engaged in the operations of Pogradec.

=== 1918 ===
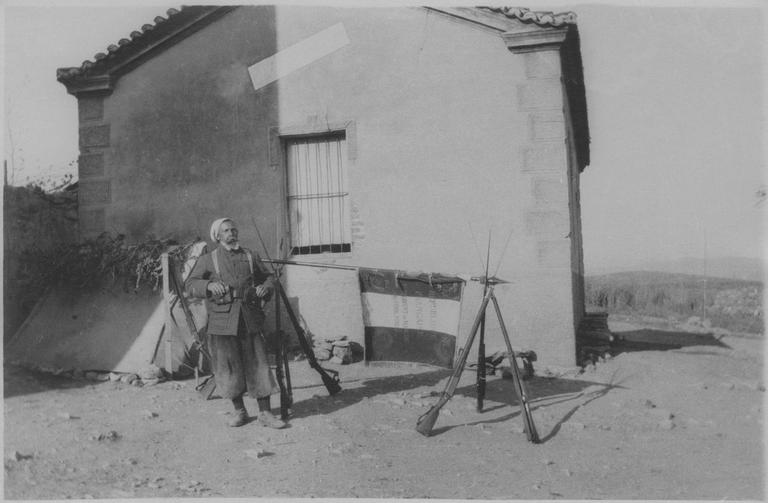
The colours of the 2nd Regiment photographed in June 1916

- 7 January - 27 August: occupation of a sector towards the Prespa and Okrida lakes (frequent local actions). Elements are detached towards Gorgopi, then to the Battle of Skra-di-Legen.
- 27 August - 16 September: relieved from the front line; dispatched to rest area towards Monastir.
- 16–29 September: occupation of a sector north of Monastir. From 21 September, the division's cavalry engaged in the fr:Manœuvre d'Uskub: advance towards Pribilci, and, on 29 September, to the outskirts of Sop (3 km north west of Cer, Kičevo) and Tsersko (sh:Golemo Cersko).
- 29 September - 11 November: Bulgarian Armistice; withdrawal from the front line; redeployed for a rest towards Lopatitsa (Lopatica, Bitola), then towards Kičevo.

=== 1919 ===
In December 1918, the 156th Division was transported to Southern Russia (as part of the Army of the Danube (AD) ). It then left this formation in November 1919 to form the Army of the Levant, during the Cilicia Campaign.

== Order of battle ==
=== May 1915 ===
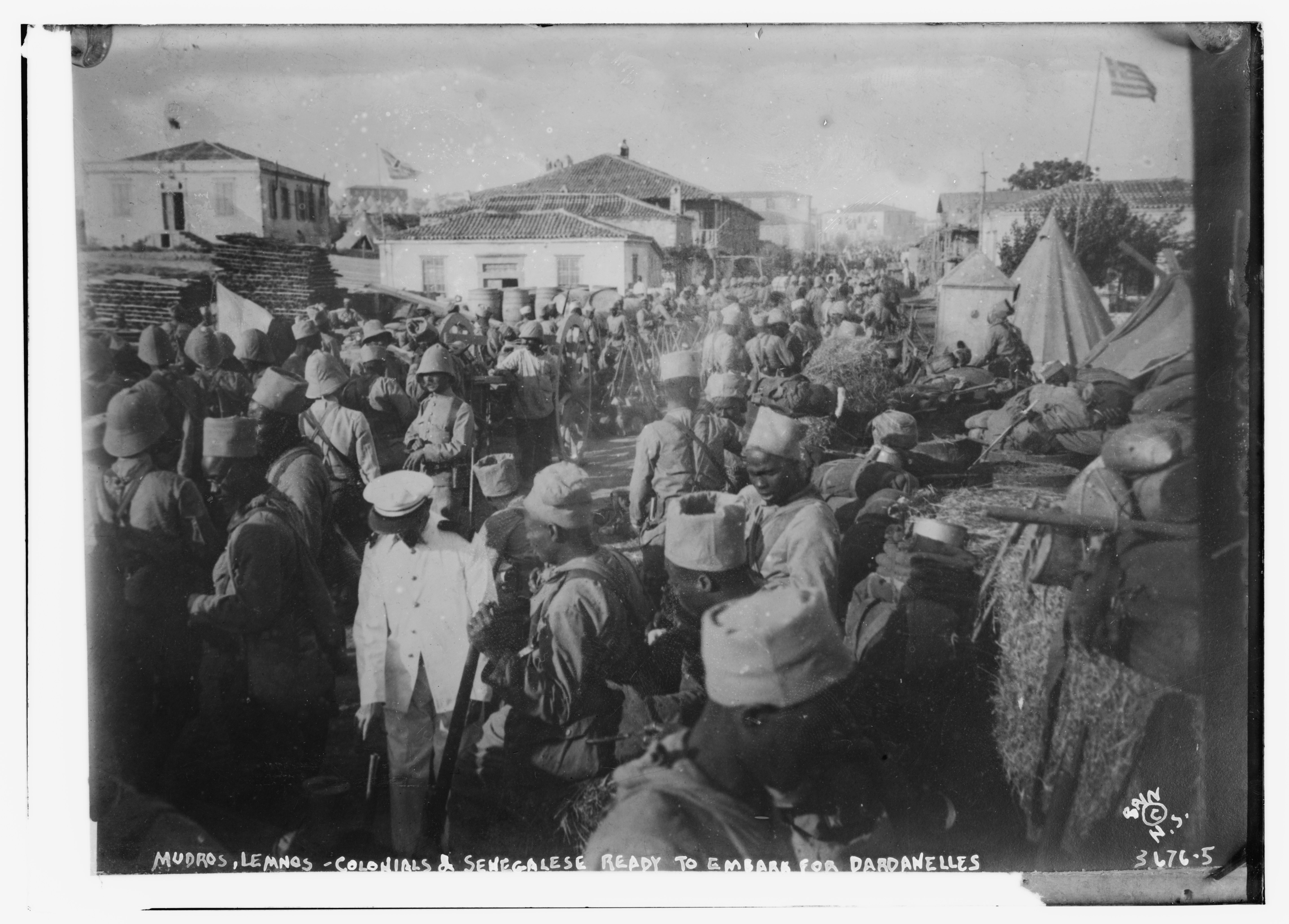
Marsouins (in pith helmets) and Senegalese (in fezzes) ready to embark for Dardanelles

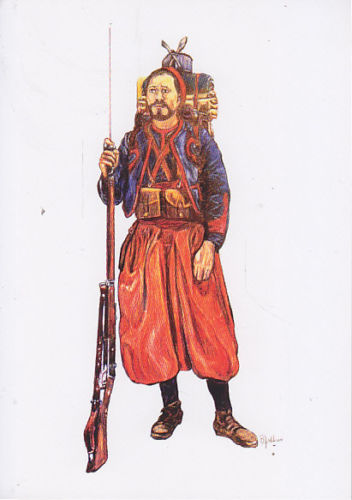
Zouave uniform for the early part of WW1

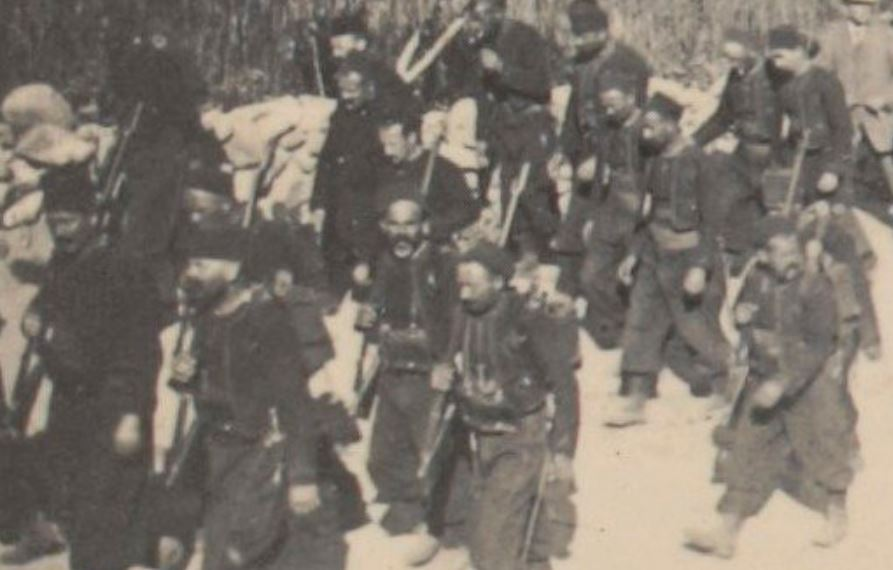
Zouaves ahead of a column of Greek recruits for the French Foreign Legion, training at Lemnos

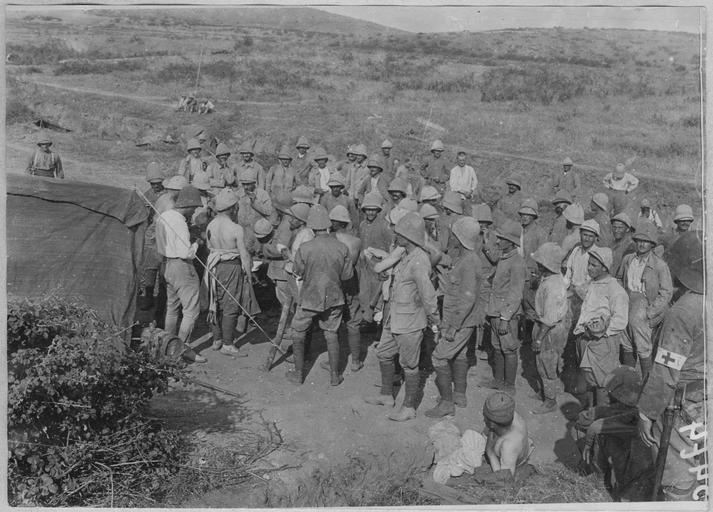
Zouaves attired in khaki field dress, wearing pith helmets, being vaccinated on 8 July 1916, in a location between Kilkis and Lake Doiran.

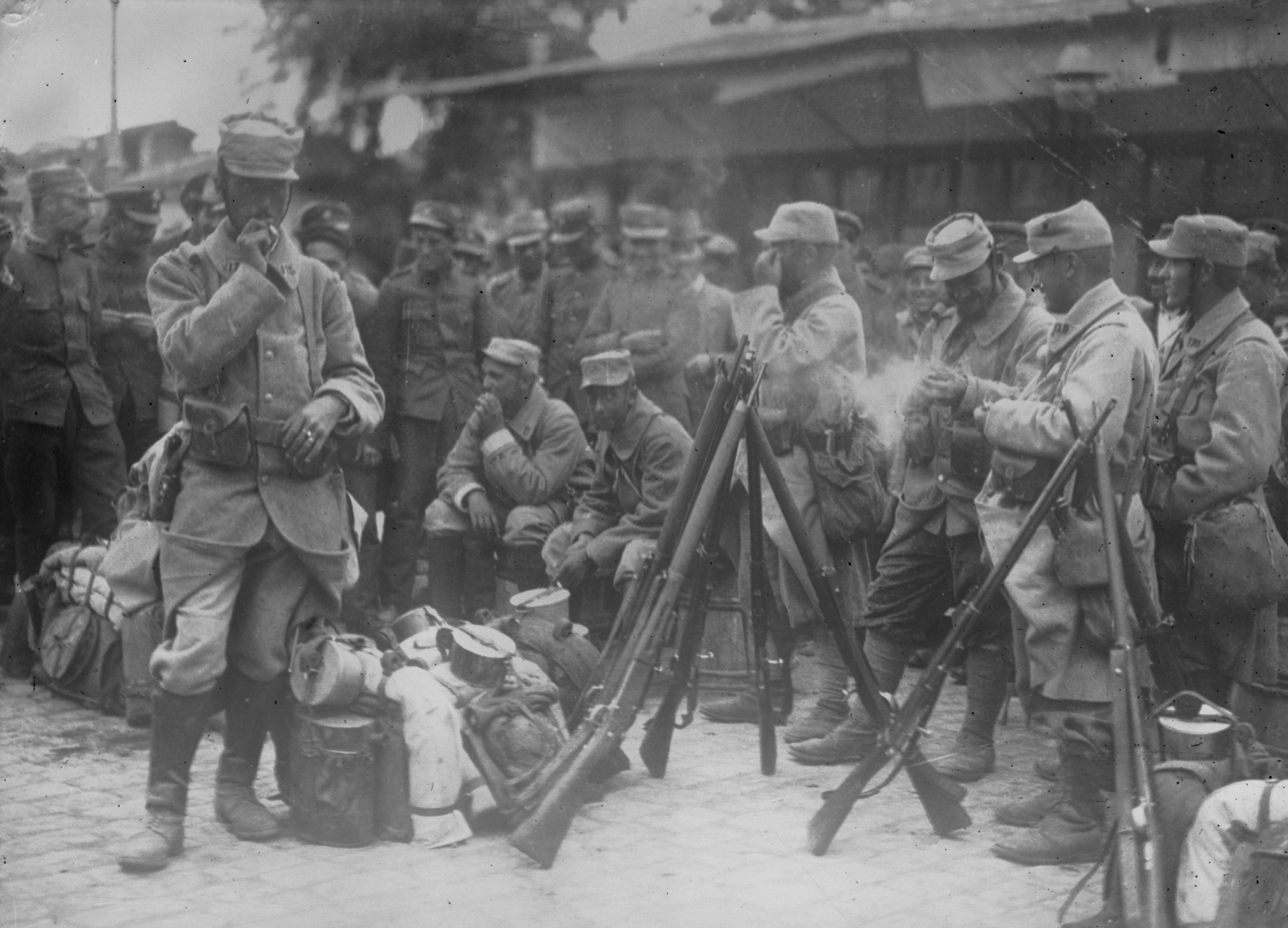
Soldiers of the 175th Infantry Regiment at Salonika in 1915

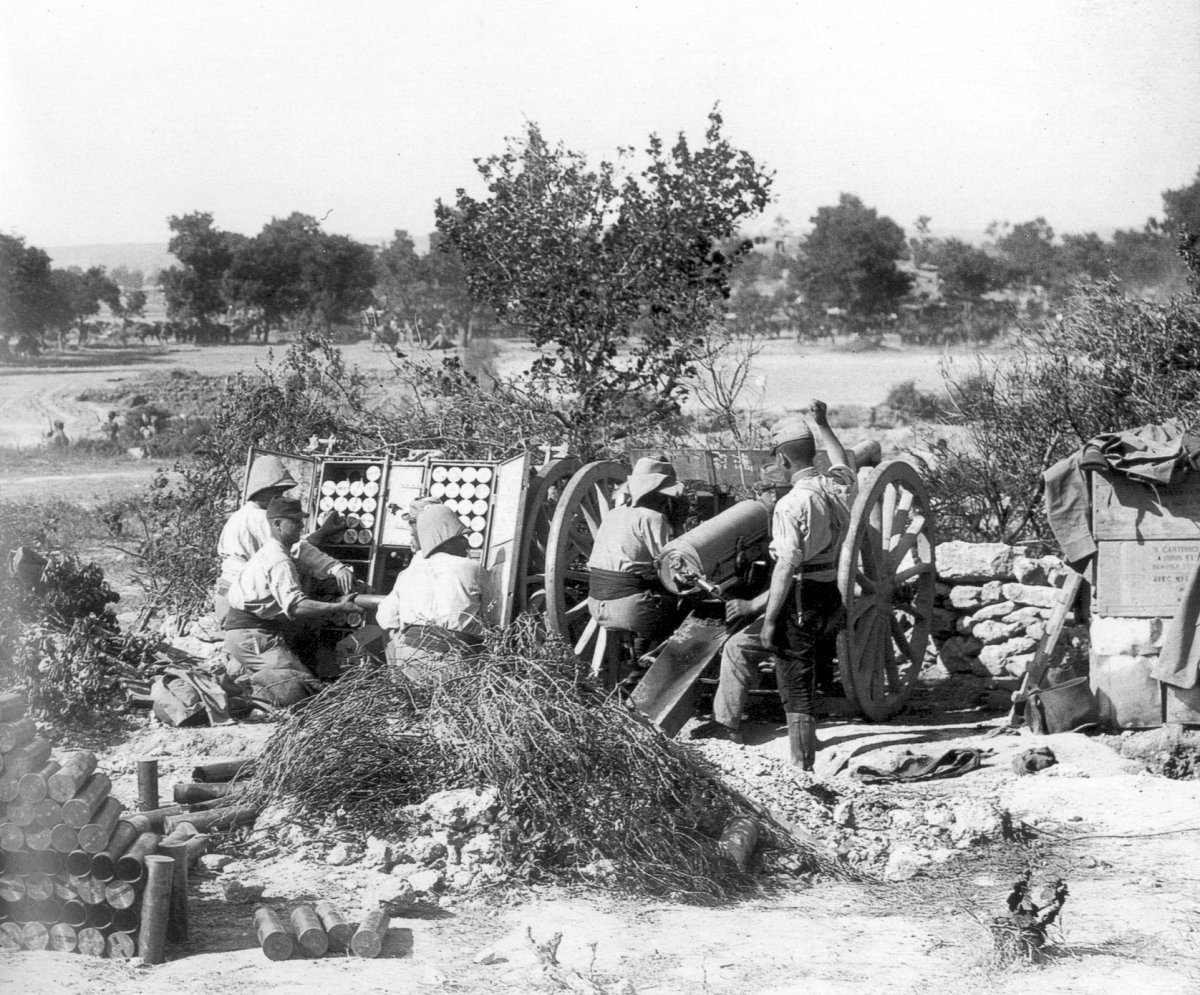
A French 75mm artillery piece firing around Cape Helles during the Third Battle of Krithia

2nd Division which disembarked at Gallipoli from 6–8 May 1915

- 3rd Metropolitan Brigade (Note: Dispatched in May 1915 to Gallipoli with the second division)
  - 176th Regiment
    - three battalions of metropolitan infantry
  - 2nd Provisional African Regiment
    - composed of three battalions of Zouaves
- 4th Colonial Brigade
  - 7th Mixed Colonial Regiment (Note: Change of regimental name and number in August 1915. The regimental war diary records that from 16 August 1915, it was no longer designated the 8th Mixed Colonial Regiment, but was henceforth the 58th Colonial Infantry Regiment. The same nomenclature saw the 4th, 6th and 7th become the 54th, 56th and 57th too.)
    - mixed composition of two battalions of Senegalese Tirailleurs, and one battalion of French regulars known as Marsouins. Both troop types classified as Troupes coloniales.
  - 8th Mixed Colonial Regiment
    - mixed composition of two battalions of Marsouins and one battalion of Senegalese
- Divisional Troops
  - Groupe Deslions - 3 batteries (4x 75mm field guns apiece) of the 17th Field Artillery Regiment commanded by Captain Deslions (Note: Dispatched in October 1915 from Gallipoli to Salonika with the second division)
  - Groupe Mercadier - 3 batteries (4x 75mm field guns apiece) of the 25th Field Artillery Regiment commanded by Captain Mercadier (succeeded by Captain Salin)
  - Groupe Roux - 3 batteries (4x 75mm field guns apiece) of the 47th Field Artillery Regiment commanded by Captain Roux (succeeded by Major Mercadier)
  - Supporting elements for engineering, logistical and medical services (Note: Appendix 3 of the French official history (AFGG 8,1) has a one page table chronologically listing the units that subsequently joined the C.E.O. at Gallipoli.)

=== October 1915 ===
Left the Dardanelles and disembarked on the Salonika front in October 1915 (Note: Général de Brigade Pierre Dauvé's 3rd Metropolitan Brigade now came under the command of the 156th Infantry Division. From this brigade, the 176th Infantry Regiment and the 2nd Regiment (of Armée d'Afrique) embarked on 30 September and 1 October respectively. Regarding the troops of Colonel Emmanuel Bertrand Alexis Bulleux's 1st Metropolitan Brigade, the 175th Infantry Regiment set sail on 1 October. The 1st Regiment (of Armée d'Afrique) were dispersed. The 2nd battalion (of Zouaves, commanded by Louis Marie Joseph Petitpas De La Vasselais) and the 3rd battalion (of Foreign Legion, commanded by Élie Jean) embarked on 1 October. The 1st Battalion (of Zouaves, commanded by Jean Louis Urbain Abadie) embarked on 6 October.) to become part of the Armée d'Orient (1915–19). The Division's War Diary lists the following elements of the Division to be embarked locally and from further afield:

- 1st Metropolitan Brigade
  - 175th Regiment
    - three battalions of metropolitan infantry
  - 1st Provisional African Regiment
    - composed of a Foreign Legion battalion and two Zouave battalions. (Note: The four companies of the Foreign Legion battalion were augmented by a further two companies composed of ethnic Greek volunteers forming the 13th and 14th companies of the provisional regiment.) Both troop types classified as Army of Africa (France)
- 3rd Metropolitan Brigade
  - 176th Regiment
    - three battalions of metropolitan infantry
  - 2nd Provisional African Regiment
    - composed of three Zouave battalions
- Divisional Troops
    - Groupe Deslions - 3 batteries (4x 75mm field guns apiece) of the 17th Field Artillery Regiment commanded by Captain Deslions
    - Groupe Salin - 3 batteries (4x 75mm field guns apiece) of the 25th Field Artillery Regiment formerly commanded by Captain Mercadier (succeeded by Captain Salin)
    - Groupe Grépinet - 2 batteries (4x 65 mm mountain guns apiece) of the 2nd Mountain Artillery Regiment formerly commanded by Major Benedittini (succeeded by Major Grépinet)
    - 6 58T trench mortars
    - Divisional Ammunition Column: Artillery park detachment, 12th Ordnance Section, half of a mobile repair workshop team. In transit from France: 1 infantry munitions section, 2 artillery munitions sections (S.M.I. - Section de Munitions d’Infanterie, S.M.A. - Section de Munitions d’Artillerie).
  - Supporting elements for engineering, logistical and medical services
    - Engineers: 2x field companies (5/15 and 5/15bis); engineer park detachment 5/22
    - Telegraphy: Divisional RT detachment, P2 signal lamp detachment, 2 radio sets to be sent from France
    - Medical: Group of divisional stretcher-bearers, ambulances 3 and 4, casualty evacuation section, half-Group of Corps stretcher-bearers. In transit from France: 1 Field Hospital, 2 Casualty Clearing Stations
    - Lines of Communication: A detachment of Army Catering Corps (COA - Commis et ouvriers d’administration), a field bakery in transit, two logistics companies in transit from Algeria, two motor transport sections in transit from France, a labour battalion.
- Corps Artillery:
  - 1 Heavy Battery of 120 mm field artillery commanded by Captain Delval
  - 1 Heavy Battery of 6x 155 mm howitzers of the 48th Field Artillery Regiment commanded by Captain Kolyczko

=== July 1916 ===
- 311th Brigade
  - 175th Regiment
    - three battalions of metropolitan infantry
  - 1st Provisional African Regiment
    - composed of a Foreign Legion battalion and two Zouave battalions. Both troop types classified as Army of Africa (France)
- 312th Brigade
  - 176th Regiment
    - three battalions of metropolitan infantry
  - 2nd Provisional African Regiment (disbanded in September 1917)
    - composed of three Zouave battalions
- Divisional Troops
  - Groupe Deslions - 3 batteries (4x 75mm field guns apiece) of the 17th Field Artillery Regiment commanded by Captain Deslions
  - Groupe Salin - 3 batteries (4x 75mm field guns apiece) of the 25th Field Artillery Regiment formerly commanded by Captain Mercadier (succeeded by Captain Salin)
  - Groupe Coloniale - 3 batteries (4x 75mm field guns apiece) of the 3rd Colonial Field Artillery Regiment, having arrived in January 1916. (There was nothing of significance to occur that warranted a mention in the regimental history.) All of the 75mm batteries above were grouped together in April 1917 to form the 242nd Field Artillery Regiment.
  - Groupe Grépinet - 2 batteries (4x 65 mm mountain guns apiece) of the 2nd Mountain Artillery Regiment formerly commanded by Major Benedittini (succeeded by Major Grépinet)
  - Mortar Battery - 102nd Battery of the 17th Field Artillery Regiment, equipped with the Mortier de 58 mm type 2, reclassified in July 1918 as the 5th Battery of the 179th Trench Artillery Regiment.
  - One cavalry squadron of the 4th Regiment of Chasseurs d'Afrique having arrived in February 1916 (disbanded November 1918).
  - Supporting elements for engineering, logistical and medical services

== Notes and citations ==
Notes

Citations
