= Soultogianneika =

Soultogiannaika Σουλτογιανναίικα
- Settlement
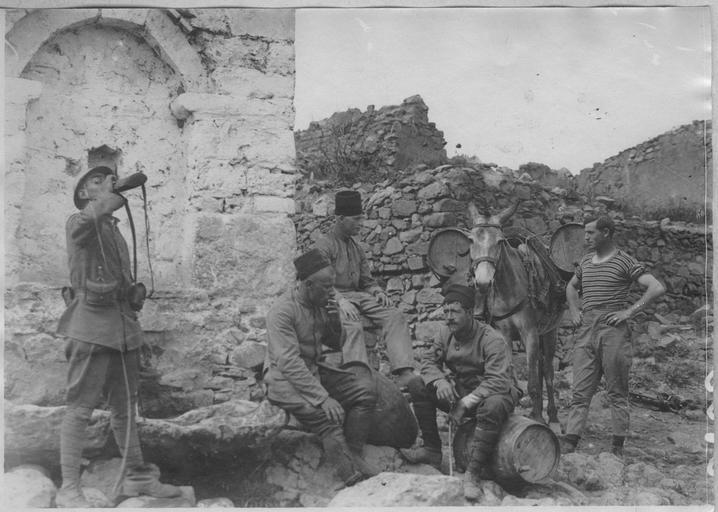
- French soldiers drink at the village fountain in May 1916

- Location within the regional unit

- Location within Greece
- Coordinates: 41°05′03″N 22°40′31″E
- Country: Greece
- Administrative region: Central Macedonia
- Regional unit: Kilkis
- Municipality: Kilkis
- Municipal unit: Cherso
- Community: Megali Sterna
- Elevation: 90 m (300 ft)

Population (2021)
  - Total: 22
- Time zone: UTC+2 (EET)
  - Summer (DST): UTC+3 (EEST)
- Postal code: 611 00
- Area code: +30 23410
- Vehicle registration: ΚΙ

Soultogiannaika (Greek: Σουλτογιανναίικα, old name: Greek: Καλίνοβο Kalinovo / Kalinova) is a village in the Kilkis region of Greece. It is situated in the municipal unit of Cherso, in the Kilkis municipality, within the Kilkis region of Central Macedonia. It is located 4 km to the west of Megali Sterna and 4 km south of Metamorfosi, Kilkis.

During the Second Balkan War, a battle took place, here at Kalinova, between Bulgarian and Greek troops, from 19–21 June 1913. The outcome is contested, with one party describing it as a Bulgarian victory (bg:Битка при Калиново), the other describing it as a part of the Greek victory at the Battle of Kilkis–Lachanas (el:Μάχη Κιλκίς-Λαχανά).

After the Second Balkan War, Kalinova came under Greece sovereignty. The Kalinova Sector of the Macedonian front was the scene of fighting between the Bulgarians and the Entente forces dominated by the Armée d'Orient (1915–1919). A number of photos from this time have survived.

Among the Sarakatsani residents who resettled in the area in the early 1920s were the Soultogiannis brothers to whom the later name of the village is due. The "Konaki" of the Soultogiannis brothers, located on the provincial road that connects Kilkis with Polykastro, has been characterized as a cultural monument since 1985 because "it is a remarkable example of architecture of the first twenty years of the 20th century and is characterized by elements of this transition for the Greek architecture of the period."

As a settlement it is officially mentioned with the old name in 1919, with the Government Gazette 48A-05/03/1919, to be annexed to the then community of Kilindir (Kalindria). In 1927 it was renamed to Sultogianeika and in 1934 it was corrected to Soultogianneika.

As per the Kallikratis plan, this village, together with Michalitsi and Megali Sterna, constitute the local community of Megali Sterna, which belongs to the municipal unit of Cherso in the municipality of Kilkis. According to the 2021 census it has a population of 22 permanent residents.
