= Michalitsi, Kilkis =

Michalitsi Μιχαλίτσι
- Settlement
- Location within the regional unit

- Location within Greece
- Coordinates: 41°04′16.18″N 22°42′10.37″E
- Country: Greece
- Administrative region: Central Macedonia
- Regional unit: Kilkis
- Municipality: Kilkis
- Municipal unit: Cherso
- Community: Megali Sterna
- Elevation: 50 m (160 ft)

Population (2021)
  - Total: 16
- Time zone: UTC+2 (EET)
  - Summer (DST): UTC+3 (EEST)
- Postal code: 611 00
- Area code: +30 23410
- Vehicle registration: ΚΙ

Michalitsi (Greek: Μιχαλίτσι, old name: Greek: Μιχάλοβο Michalovo) is a village in the Kilkis region of Greece. It is situated in the municipal unit of Cherso, in the Kilkis municipality, within the Kilkis region of Central Macedonia.

Michalitsi is located south of Dojran Lake, between the villages Soultogianneika (NW), Megali Sterna (NE), Iliolousto (SE) and Valtoudi (in Paionia) (N). It is 25.5 km NW of the city of Kilkis (via Cherso) and 71 km NW of Thessaloniki.

From the period of Turkish rule, but several years later, the area around the village was a manor of Soultogianni brothers and indicated with the name Michalovo . In 1927 it was renamed Michalitsi. As a settlement it is included in the censuses from 1981 part of the then community of Megali Sterna.

As per the Kallikratis plan, this village, together with Soultogianneika and Megali Sterna, constitute the local community of Megali Sterna, which belongs to the municipal unit of Cherso in the municipality of Kilkis. Michalitsi has a population of 14 permanent residents according to the 2021 census.
