= Kalindria =

Kalindria Καλίνδρια
- Settlement
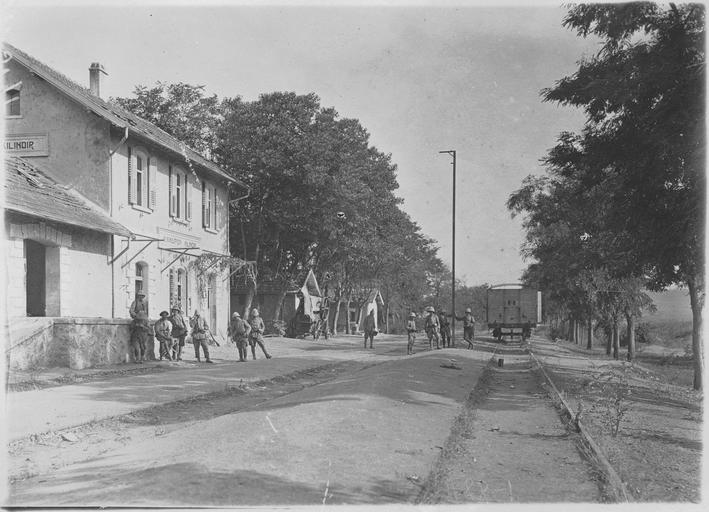
- The railway station photographed by the French Army in July 1916

- Location within the regional unit

- Location within Greece
- Coordinates: 41°06′51.01″N 22°47′23.79″E
- Country: Greece
- Administrative region: Central Macedonia
- Regional unit: Kilkis
- Municipality: Kilkis
- Municipal unit: Cherso
- Community: Cherso
- Elevation: 120 m (390 ft)

Population (2021)
  - Total: 98
- Time zone: UTC+2 (EET)
  - Summer (DST): UTC+3 (EEST)
- Postal code: 611 00
- Area code: +30 23410
- Vehicle registration: ΚΙ

Kalindria (Greek: Καλίνδρια, old name: Greek: Κιλινδίρ Kilindir Bulgarian: Крондирци Krondirtsi) is a village in the Kilkis region of Greece. It is situated in the municipal unit of Cherso, in the Kilkis municipality, within the Kilkis region of Central Macedonia.

== Geography ==
The village is located 18 km north of Kilkis on the road to Doiran Lake and Rodopoli, Serres. Cherso is 3 km to the south, and Plagia, Kilkis is 5 km to the west.

The terrain around Kalindria is hilly to the northeast, but to the southwest it is flat. (Note: Calculated from the variance in all elevation data (DEM 3 ") from Viewfinder Panoramas, within 10 km radius. sv:Lsjbot-algoritmnot) The highest point in the vicinity is 537 metres above sea level, 6.6 km northeast of Kalindria. (Note: Calculated from height data (DEM 3 ") from Viewfinder Panoramas.) Around Kalíndria it is quite sparsely populated, with 40 inhabitants per square kilometre. The nearest major community is Kilkis, 15.2 km southeast of Kalindria. The area around Kalindria consists mostly of agricultural land.

The climate in the area is temperate . Average annual temperature in the neighbourhood is 15 °C . The warmest month is August, when the average temperature is 28 °C, and the coldest is December, with 2 °C. Average annual rainfall is 984 millimetres. The wettest month is February, with an average of 137 mm of precipitation, and the driest is August, with 32 mm of precipitation.

The old name of the village, from the Turkish occupation, was Kilindir and with this name it is mentioned in 1919 in the Government Gazette 48A-05/03/1919 to be annexed to the then community of Kilindir. In 1926 it was renamed Kalindria and in 1934 it was detached from the prefecture of Thessaloniki to the prefecture of Kilkis. According to the Kallikratis plan, this village, together with Eleftherochori, Iliolousto and Cherso constitute the local community of Cherso which belongs to the municipal unit of Cherso of the municipality of Kilkis. According to the 2011 census it has a population of 98 permanent residents.

== History ==
=== In the Middle Ages ===
According to a hypothesis of Yordan Ivanov, near Krondirtsi was the fortress Kolidron (Kolidros, Kolindron), defended by Samuil's voivode Dimitar Tihon and conquered in 1002 by the Byzantine emperor Basil II.

=== In the Ottoman Empire ===
In the Ethnography of the Provinces of Adrianople, Monastir and Thessaloniki, published in Constantinople in 1878 and reflecting the statistics of the male population from 1873, Crondirtzi is mentioned as a village with 80 houses and 389 Bulgarian inhabitants within the Demirhisar Kaza of the Sanjak of Serres in the Ottoman Empire. According to Vasil Kanchov (" Macedonia. Ethnography and Statistics ") in 1900 Krondirtsi (Kelendir) has 200 Bulgarian inhabitants. The whole village is practically under the rule of the Constantinople Patriarchate - one of the few patriarchal villages in Kukushko. According to the Secretary of the Bulgarian Exarchate Dimitar Mishev(" La Macedoine et sa Population Chrétienne ") in 1905 in the village ( Alikhodjalar ) there were 312 Bulgarian patriarchal Greeks.

At the outbreak of the First Balkan War in 1912, three people from Krondirtsi were volunteers in the Macedonian-Edirne militia.

=== In Greece ===
After the Second Balkan War, Krondirtsi came under Greece sovereignty. The Kilindir Sector of the Macedonian front was the scene of fighting between the Bulgarians and the Entente forces dominated by the Armée d'Orient (1915–1919). A number of photos from this time have survived. In 1926 the village was renamed Kalindria.

Greek refugees are accommodated in the village. In 1928, Krondirtsi was presented as a mixed local refugee village with 96 refugee families and 366 refugees. Following the Balkan Wars and the exchange of populations, the Refugee Rehabilitation Commission (EAP) resettled 96 refugee families, mostly from Aimonas, Eastern Rumelia. Every year, on January 8, the inhabitants revive the custom of "Babos" (Feminism) according to which the women of the village impose their absolute power for one day with the central figure being "mammi" or grandmother.

== Notes and citations ==
Notes

Citations
