= Koromilia, Kilkis =

Koromilia Κορομηλιά
- Settlement
- Location within Greece
- Coordinates: 41°04′33.11″N 22°51′14.77″E
- Country: Greece
- Administrative region: Central Macedonia
- Regional unit: Kilkis
- Municipality: Kilkis
- Municipal unit: Cherso
- Community: Plagia
- Elevation: 240 m (790 ft)

Population (2021)
  - Total: 264
- Time zone: UTC+2 (EET)
  - Summer (DST): UTC+3 (EEST)
- Postal code: 611 00
- Area code: +30 23410
- Vehicle registration: ΚΙ

Koromilia (Greek: Κορομηλιά, old name: Greek: Ερεκλή Erekli) is a village in the Kilkis region of Greece. It is situated in the municipal unit of Cherso, in the Kilkis municipality, within the Kilkis region of Central Macedonia.

== Geography ==
Koromilia is located 248 meters above sea level and the population as of 2021 was 264.

The terrain around Koromilia is flat to the southwest, but to the northeast it is hilly. (Note: Calculated from the variance in all elevation data (DEM 3 ") from Viewfinder Panoramas, within 10 km radius. sv:Lsjbot-algoritmnot) The highest point in the vicinity is 373 meters above sea level, 1.1 km east of the Koromilia. (Note: Calculated from height data (DEM 3 ") from Viewfinder Panoramas.) Around Koromilia it is sparsely populated, with 10 inhabitants per square kilometre. The nearest major community is Kilkis, 9.4 km south of Koromilia. The area around Koromilia consists mostly of agricultural land.

The climate in the area is temperate . Average annual temperature in the neighbourhood is 15 °C . The warmest month is July, when the average temperature is 28 °C, and the coldest is December, with 2 °C. Average annual rainfall is 984 millimetres. The wettest month is February, with an average of 137 mm of precipitation, and the driest is August, with 32 mm of precipitation.

== Notes and citations ==
Notes

Citations
