= Corps expéditionnaire d'Orient =

French Gallipoli campaign unit (1915–16)

Corps Expeditionnaire d'Orient
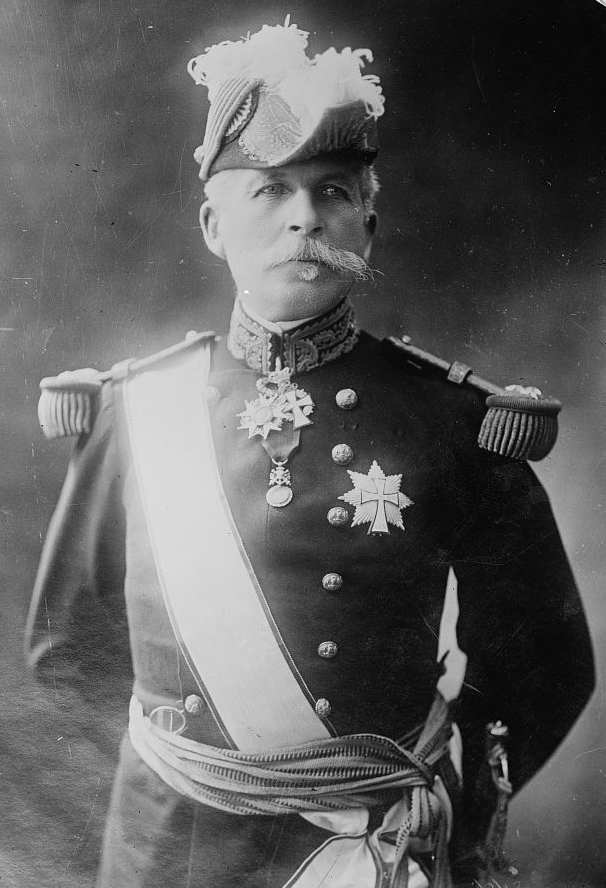
- Albert d'Amade, the CEO's first commander
- Active: 1915–1916
- Country: France
- Role: Expeditionary force
- Size: 1–2 Divisions
- Garrison/HQ: Paris
- Engagements: World War I: Gallipoli campaign

Commanders
- Notable commanders: Albert d'Amade; Henri Gouraud; Maurice Bailloud

The Corps Expéditionnaire d'Orient (Oriental Expeditionary Force) (CEO) was a French expeditionary force raised for service during the Gallipoli Campaign in World War I. The corps initially consisted of a single infantry division, but later grew to two divisions. It took part in fighting around Kum Kale, on the Asiatic side of the Dardanelles, at the start of the campaign before being moved to Cape Helles where it fought alongside British formations for the remainder of the campaign. In October 1915, the corps was reduced to one division again and was finally evacuated from the Gallipoli peninsula in January 1916 when it ceased to exist.

== Formation ==
Initially, the force consisted of 16,700 troops organised into one division, made up of two brigades, which included "metropolitan" French, and colonial troops. The so-called metropolitan units included two battalions of zouaves, mainly recruited from French settlers (Pieds-Noirs) in Algeria and Tunisia, plus one battalion of the Foreign Legion, both troop types associated with the 19th Military District of Metropolitan France, known as the Armee d'Afrique. They were joined by the 175th regiment of French line infantry, its troops provided by the other 18 military districts of (mainland) Metropolitan France. The colonial troops consisted of both West African Tirailleurs Senegalais and white regulars of colonial infantry ("marsouins"), amounting to four and two battalions respectively. The force had a strong divisional artillery, consisting of six field and two mountain batteries, (Note: Appendix 1 of the French official history (AFGG 8,1) has a four page table listing the units of the C.E.O. at its departure on 4 March 1915. Appendix 2 has a four page breakout of the transport vessels and units aboard.) but having been raised quickly, it received only limited training as a formation. With only two brigades it was smaller than the British divisions that took part in the campaign, having a strength of 16,762 men.

Later in the campaign, the corps was expanded to include a second division. Supporting Corps troops and additional artillery were subsequently shipped to Gallipoli. (Note: Appendix 3 of the French official history (AFGG 8,1) has a one page table chronologically listing the units that subsequently joined the C.E.O. at Gallipoli.) Four squadrons of cavalry were also present, the unit being renamed as the 8th provisional regiment of Chasseurs d'Afrique on 29 July 1915.

Troops assigned to the corps wore varying coloured uniforms, even in combat, in contrast to those worn by some of the other nations which they fought alongside. War correspondent Ellis Ashmead-Bartlett, writing from Gallipoli, provides this account of a scene around Krithia in May 1915:

"Neither was the picturesque element of colour absent from the scene, as in most modern battles, for amidst the green and yellow of the fields and gardens the dark blue uniforms of the Senegalese, the red trousers of the Zouaves, and the new light blue uniform of the Infantry showed up in pleasant contrast amidst the dull-hued masses of the British brigades."

== Operational service ==
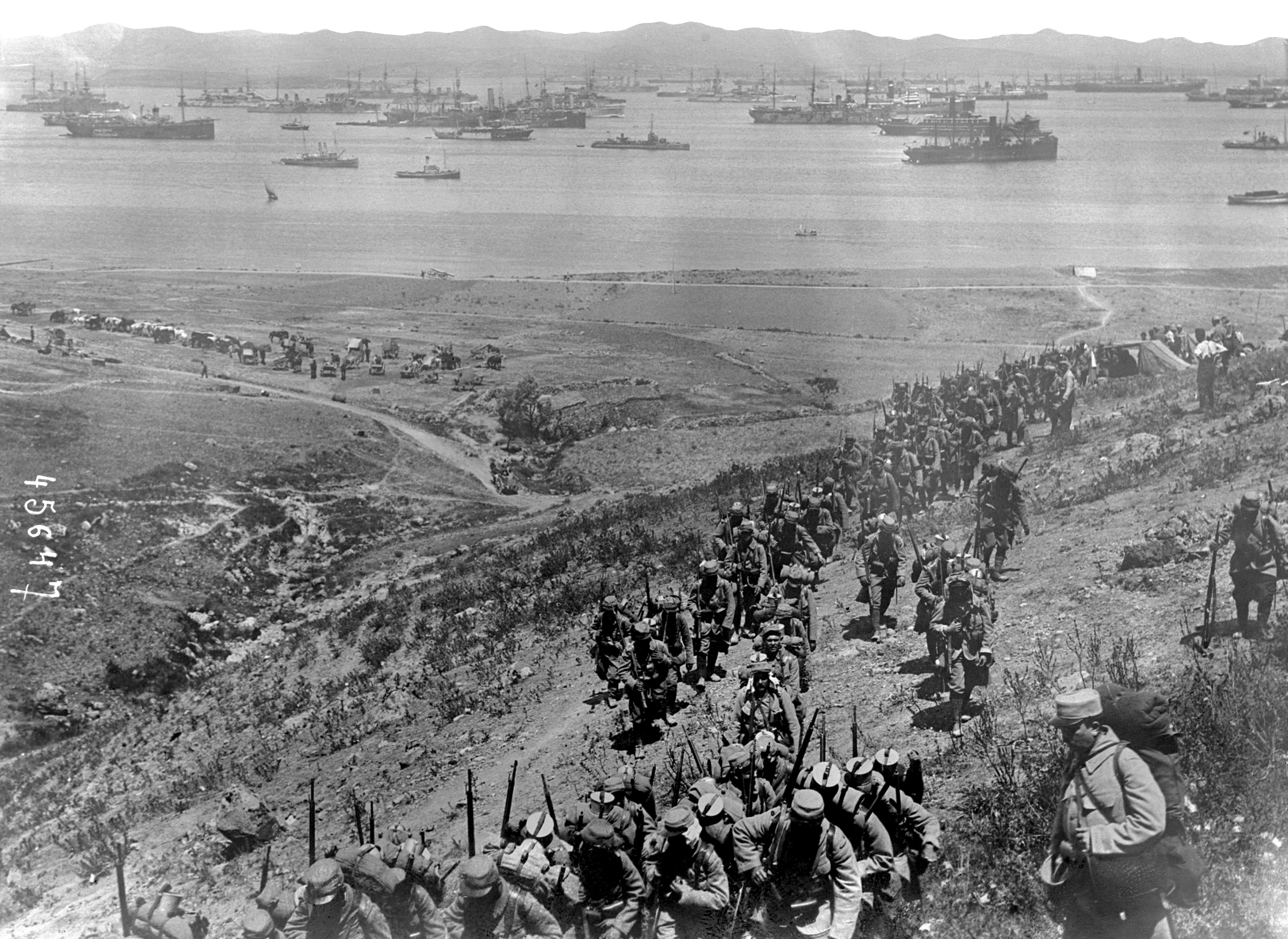
French troops landing on Lemnos, 1915, prior to the Gallipoli Campaign.

Following the Ottoman Empire's entry into the war on the Central Powers side in late 1914, the Allies began preparations to capture the Dardanelles in order to secure a supply route to Russia. As part of these preparations, the Corps Expeditionnaire d'Orient was raised on 22 February 1915 under the command of General Albert d'Amade, who had previously served in Morocco and the Western Front.

Throughout February and March, Anglo-French naval forces attempted to penetrate the Dardanelles, aided by small landing parties that were put ashore to destroy Ottoman fortifications. Several small-scale operations were undertaken, starting on 19 February, but they were hampered by bad weather which delayed the main attack until 18 March. Entering the straits in broad daylight, the force was heavily engaged by Ottoman shore batteries and following heavy losses from mines and shelling, they were forced to turn back. After this, the Allied strategy to capture the Dardanelles turned towards a large-scale landing.

Colonial troops of the second division en route to Gallipoli in May 1915

Hastily formed, after assembling on Lemnos there had been no time for the corps to undertake large-scale training before it was committed to the land campaign. During the initial Allied landing on 25 April, the corps undertook a diversionary landing on the Dardanelles Asiatic coast around Kum Kale, to divert Ottoman forces away from the main landings on the Gallipoli Peninsula, and to disrupt Ottoman artillery that could have fired upon the main landings. The 6th Mixed Colonial Regiment led the division ashore, supported by three battleships and a Russian warship. Part of the first wave was turned back by heavy fire, but the rest managed to get ashore and they proceeded to secure the village and an Ottoman fort. Throughout the course of 26 April, the Ottoman 3rd Division counterattacked, but the following day, having lost over 2,200 killed or wounded, the Ottomans began surrendering to the French in large numbers. Nevertheless, the French were withdrawn shortly afterwards, having lost about 300 killed and 500 wounded.

Following this, the French force re-embarked and was landed at Cape Helles, where they took up a position on the right flank around 'S' Beach. On 28 April, the commander of the C.E.O. set up the French headquarters at the old castle situated at Sedd el Bahr. With a strength of 24 companies, they subsequently took part in the First Battle of Krithia on 28 April. In early May, the Ottoman forces launched a heavy counterattack on the Allied positions with a force of over 16,000 men. The attack was beaten back, but the French division suffered heavy casualties – up to 2,000 men – and at the height of the assault some of the Senegalese and Zouaves "broke and ran". As a result, the 2nd Naval Brigade from the British Royal Naval Division, had to take over some of their positions. Reinforcements were brought in, including a second French division, which arrived between 6 and 8 May, although they did not arrive in time to take part in the Second Battle of Krithia, during which the 1st Division attacked towards the Kereves Dere gully, and although they made slow progress they eventually managed to secure the high ground overlooking this position before the attack petered out.

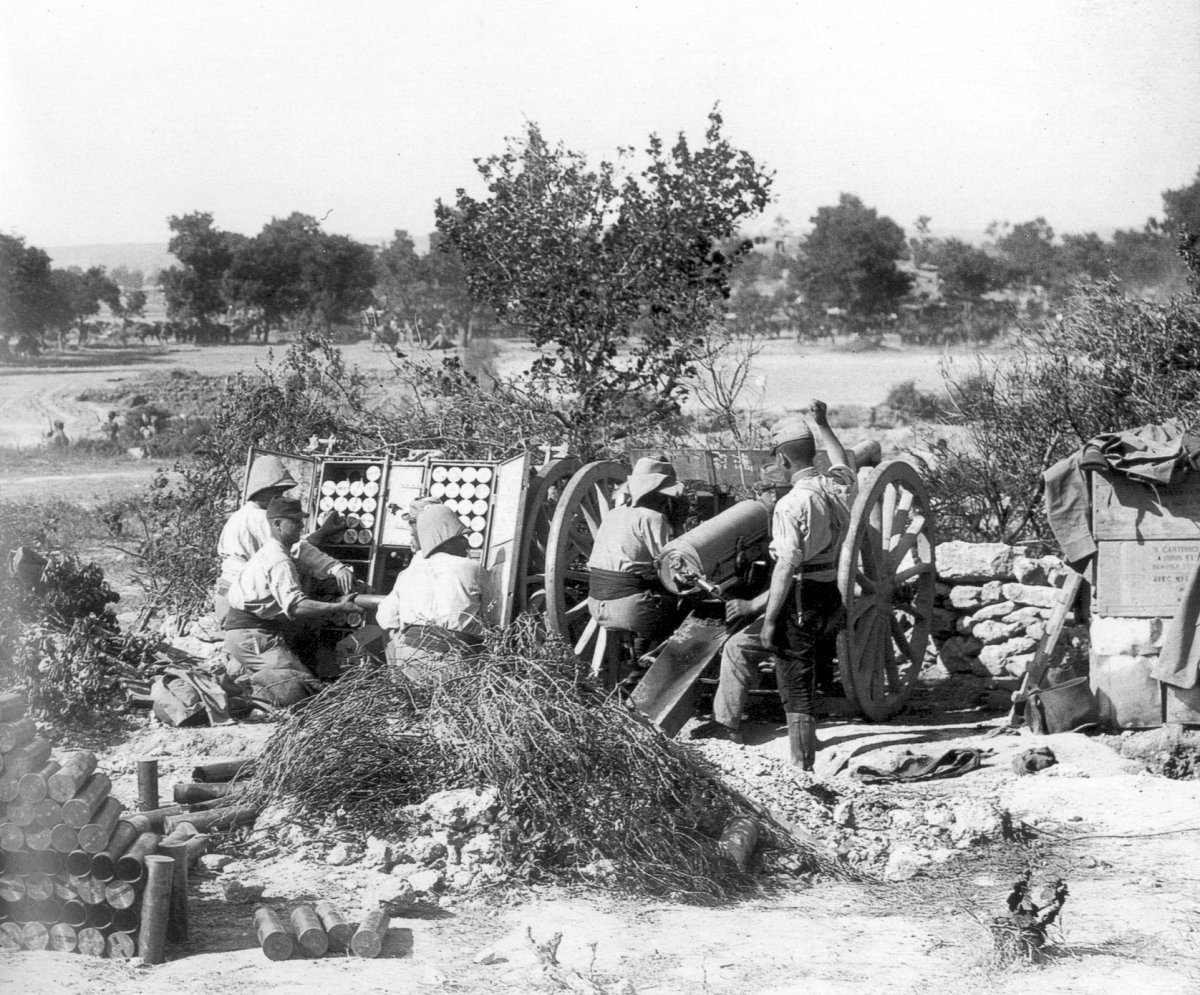
A French 75mm artillery piece firing around Cape Helles during the Third Battle of Krithia

D'Amade was replaced as commander of the corps in late May when he was dismissed and recalled to France. He was replaced by General Henri Gouraud. On 4 June, both divisions took part in the Third Battle of Krithia, once again forming the right of the Allied line as part of the effort to take Achi Baba, a high feature that dominated the Allied position. The six French batteries were detached to support the British, while the infantry were tasked with attacking the Haricot Redoubt, overlooking the Kereves Dere spur. Attacking in daylight, but possessing a numerical superiority, the Allies made ground across a broad front, before the French were forced back by an Ottoman counterattack, and suffering 2,000 casualties. Regaining positions on the right, the Ottomans were able to enfilade the British positions and eventually they too were forced back, and the attack ultimately failed. In preparation for the August Offensive, minor attacks continued around Helles, and the French undertook further attacks on the Haricot Redoubt, which they subsequently took on 21 June albeit with heavy casualties. In the four days fighting, from 21 to 25 June, the French suffered over 2,500 killed and wounded.

On 30 June, command of the corps changed again when Gouraud, who had been viewed with considerable respect by the British commander, Ian Hamilton, was wounded while touring the front line to boost the morale of his troops. He was replaced by Maurice Bailloud, who had previously commanded one of the corps' divisions. On 12 July, an Allied attack at the centre of the line along Achi Baba Nullah (Bloody Valley), gained very little ground and lost 2,500 casualties out of 7,500 men; the Royal Naval Division had 600 casualties and French losses were 800 men. Ottoman losses were about 9,000 casualties and 600 prisoners.

== Corps expéditionnaire des Dardanelles ==
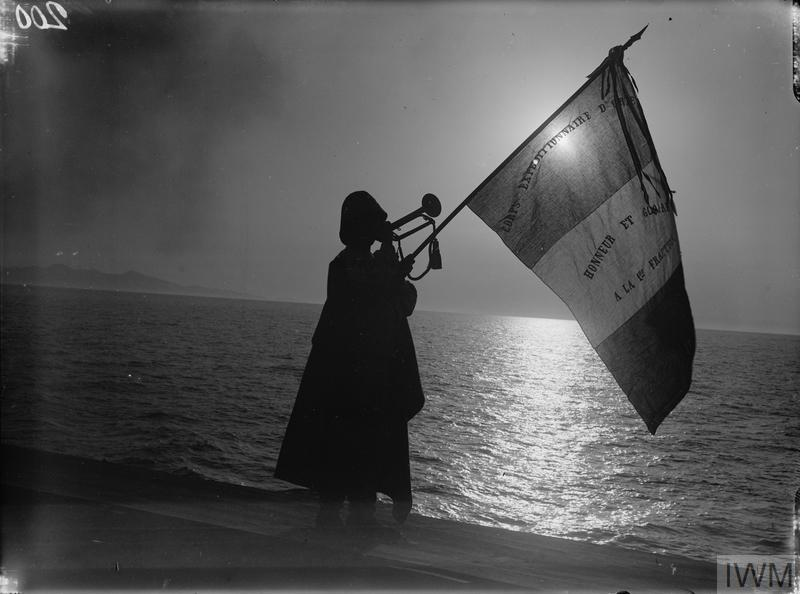
Bugler of the Corps expeditionaire d'Orient sounding a call at sunset on a French transport ship - 1915

A period of stalemate followed, and after the August Offensive failed to break the deadlock, the Allied commanders at Gallipoli requested heavy reinforcements. The French initially proposed to send a further four divisions, but following Bulgaria's entry into the war, this was cancelled, and in late September one of the corps' divisions was diverted to Salonika, on the Macedonian front. On 24 September, a secret telegram was despatched from the French Minister of War to Bailloud. He was ordered to prepare a division of the C.E.O. composed exclusively of metropolitan units to be sent to aid Serbia. Bailloud and the reconstituted division commenced embarkation on 30 September. (Note: Général de Brigade Pierre Dauvé's 3rd Metropolitan Brigade now came under the command of the 156th Infantry Division. From this brigade, the 176th Infantry Regiment and the 2nd Regiment (of Armée d'Afrique) embarked on 30 September and 1 October respectively. Regarding the troops of Colonel Emmanuel Bertrand Alexis Bulleux's 1st Metropolitan Brigade, the 175th Infantry Regiment set sail on 1 October. The 1st Regiment (of Armée d'Afrique) were dispersed. The 2nd battalion (of Zouaves, commanded by Louis Marie Joseph Petitpas De La Vasselais) and the 3rd battalion (of Foreign Legion, commanded by Élie Jean) embarked on 1 October. The 1st Battalion (of Zouaves, commanded by Jean Louis Urbain Abadie) embarked on 6 October.) The division resumed its nomenclature of 156th Infantry Division, and was no longer referred to as the 2nd Division of the C.E.O. thereafter. At the same time, the 10th (Irish) Division was also shipped from Gallipoli, to counter the threat from Bulgaria.

As the French began to refocus their actions in the Mediterranean around Salonika, the Corps expéditionnaire d'Orient was renamed the "Corps expéditionnaire des Dardanelles" on 4 October. Notwithstanding the reduction in troop levels, a total of 21,000 French troops remained on the peninsula to show political support to the British nevertheless. There were 8,599 men in the 12 infantry battalions as at 1 October 1915, according to the first report from the C.E.D.'s new commander. (Note: Colonel Pierre Giradon's report to the Minister of War on the Corps expéditionnaire de Dardanelles, dated 4 November 1915, has 16,000 men drawing rations on Gallipoli, and 8,000 on Mudros. Of these, the combat strength is 10,000 rifles and 60 artillery pieces. In this report, he recommends the withdrawal of the unacclimatised Senegalese, prior to, if not before, 15 December 1915, who are incapable of tolerating a winter in the Dardanelles.) The attrition through combat deaths and sickness due to the poor sanitary conditions meant that none of the four infantry regiments had maintained their establishment strength of 120 officers and 3,150 other ranks. The corps remained in existence until 6 January 1916 (Note: "General Birdwood had already been told that the evacuation of the French contingent, other than the guns to be left in British care, must be completed by the 6th January.") when, following the evacuation of French forces from the peninsula, it was subsumed into the larger Army of the Orient serving in Salonika.

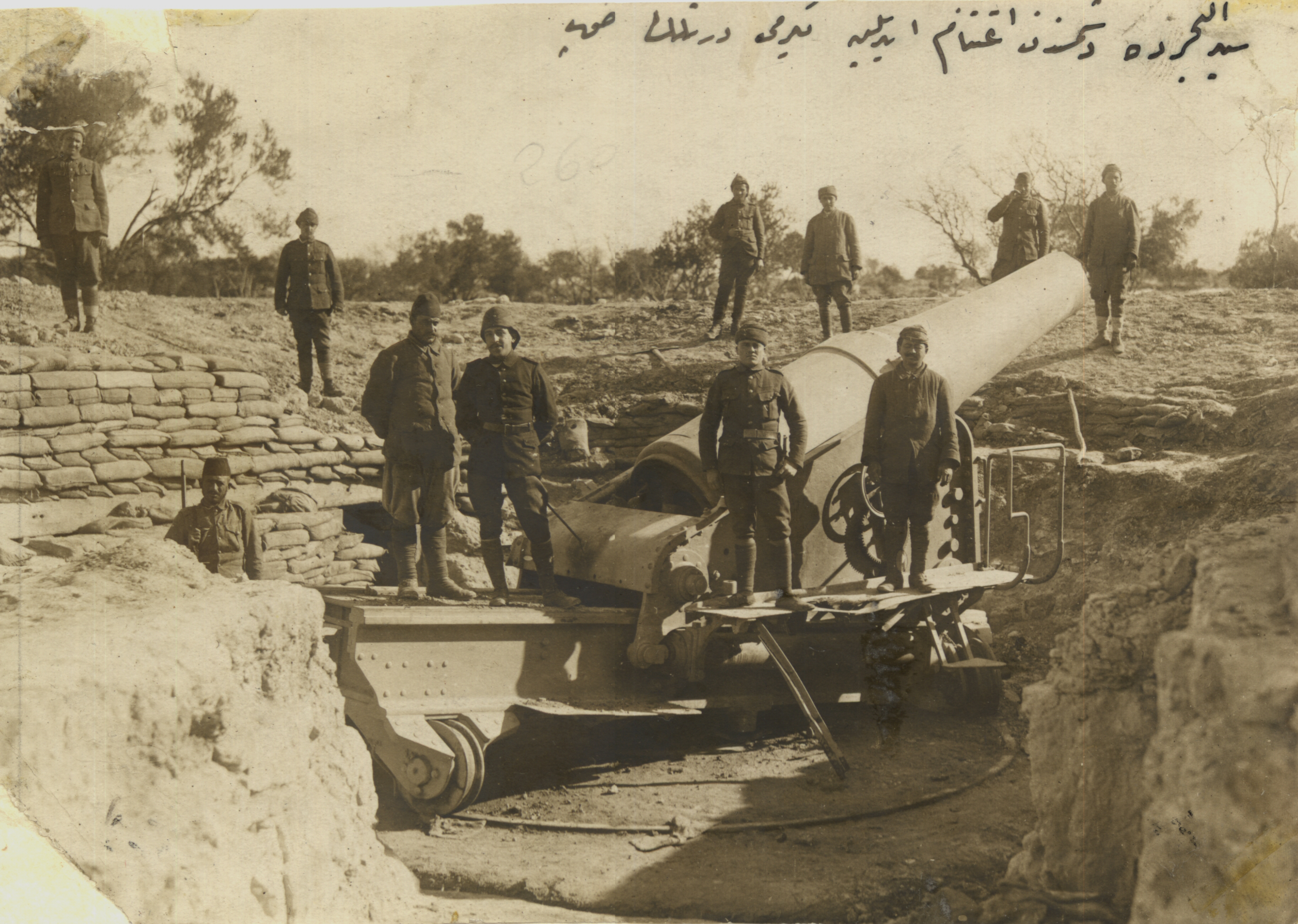
A mle 1876 captured by Ottoman forces at Gallipoli, after the Allied evacuation of January 1916.

In the autumn of 1915, there were concerns as to the ability of the Senegalese to cope with the winter weather, and their withdrawal from Gallipoli was proposed, once the British agreed to replace them. In order to facilitate this, the 57th and 58th regiments were to be composed of Senegalese, with the 54th and 56th composed of Marsouins. This reconstitution took place on 11 December 1915. Similarly, five companies of creoles were detached from the 54th and 56th in order to be sent to a wintering camp. The plan did not go ahead. The creole companies of the 54th were detached on 15 December, and returned to their unit on 22 January 1916. The two locations for the "wintering" were either Egypt or Algeria. For political reasons, it was deemed inappropriate to send them there, but to keep them on Lesbos. It was usual practice for Senegalese to be sent to Fréjus for a period of "wintering" (hivernage), but this location did not get proposed as an alternative, notwithstanding its previous mention by General Joffre. The men of the 58th were evacuated in batches between 16 December and 5 January, whilst the 57th were evacuated by a convoy of several ships on 13 December 1915. The marsouins of the 54th and the 56th were evacuated on 2 and 3 January 1916 respectively. Six older artillery pieces were destroyed and abandoned, two 140 mm guns (modèle 1884) and four 240 mm guns (modèle 1876), given that it was not possible to embark all of the heavy guns.

At its height, following the deployment of its second division in May, the corps' strength was around 42,000 men. (Note: General Jean César Graziani, as Chief of the General Staff of the French Army, was asked to provide statistical information, in respect of in the Gallipoli and Salonika campaigns, to highlight French participation in these theatres of war to the Russians. The peak strength of the C.E.O. was 950 officers and 41,000 other ranks, of whom 6,792 were of creole or African ethnicity, when the corps had a strength of two divisions. Following the redeployment to Salonika, the remaining division and supporting staff were 600 officers and 22,000 other ranks.) Overall, 79,000 men served in the corps throughout the duration of the campaign. Casualties during the campaign amounted to around 47,000 killed, wounded or sick. Of these, 27,169 were specifically killed, wounded or missing with an implied 20,000 who fell sick. (Note: Appendix 5 of the French official history (AFGG 8,1) has a one page table that not only splits these into subcategory columns but also breaks out the casualties into nine time period rows. For comparative purposes, out of 205,000 British casualties, 115,000 were killed, missing and wounded, 90,000 were evacuated sick.) Out of 6,092 missing men, less than one percent were taken prisoner. There is a sole French cemetery on the peninsula, situated to the north of Morto Bay. Veterans were eligible for the Dardanelles campaign medal that was authorised on 15 June 1926.

== Order of battle ==
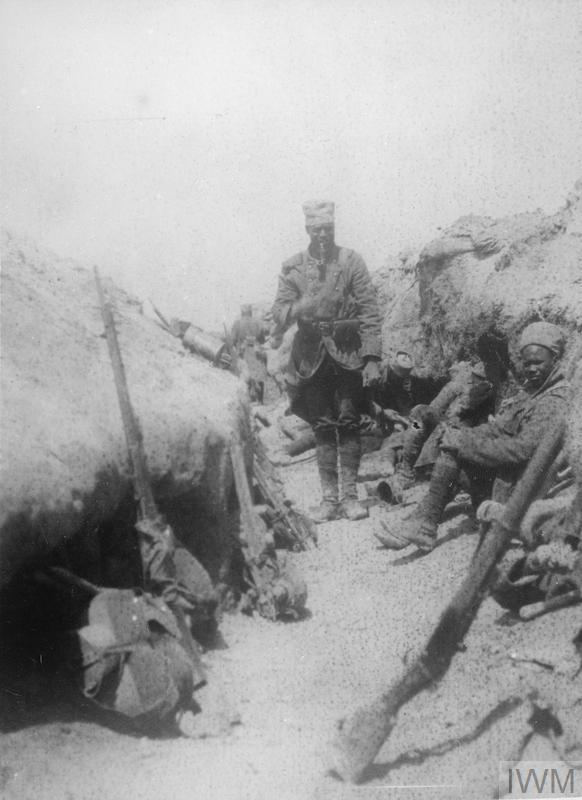
Tirailleurs Sénégalais from a Régiment Mixte Coloniale in French positions on Gallipoli on 15 May 1915

1st Division (renamed as fr:17e division d'infanterie coloniale on 6 January 1916) under Jean-Marie Brulard

- 1st Metropolitan Brigade (Note: Dispatched in October 1915 from Gallipoli to Salonika with the second division)
  - 175th Regiment
    - three battalions of metropolitan infantry
  - 1st Provisional African Regiment
    - composed of a Foreign Legion battalion and two Zouave battalions. (Note: The four companies of the Foreign Legion battalion were augmented by a further two companies composed of ethnic Greek volunteers forming the 13th and 14th companies of the provisional regiment.)
- 2nd Colonial Brigade
  - 4th Mixed Colonial Regiment (Note: Change of regimental name and number in August 1915. The regimental war diary records that from 16 August 1915, it was no longer designated the 8th Mixed Colonial Regiment, but was henceforth the 58th Colonial Infantry Regiment. The same nomenclature saw the 4th, 6th and 7th become the 54th, 56th and 57th too.)
    - mixed composition of two Senegalese battalions and one European battalion
  - 6th Mixed Colonial Regiment
    - mixed composition of two Senegalese battalions and one European battalion
- Divisional Troops
  - Groupe Holtzapfel – 3 batteries (4x 75mm field guns apiece) of the 1st Field Artillery Regiment commanded by Major Holtzapfel
  - Groupe Charpy – 3 batteries (4x 75mm field guns apiece) of the 8th Field Artillery Regiment commanded by Major Charpy
  - Groupe Benedittini – 2 batteries (4x 65 mm mountain guns apiece) of the 2nd Mountain Artillery Regiment commanded by Major Benedittini (succeeded by Major Grépinet)
  - Supporting elements for engineering, logistical and medical services

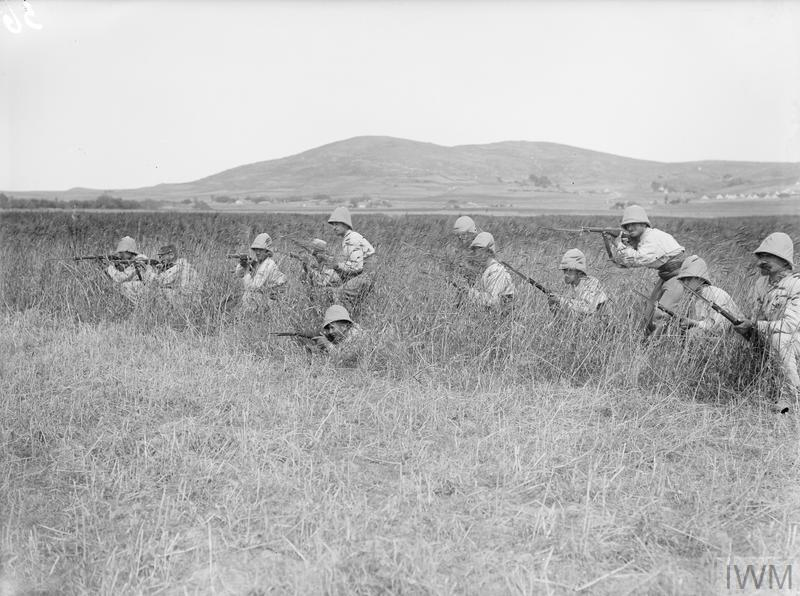
French colonial infantry ('marsouins') from a Régiment Mixte Coloniale practising an advance at Mudros

2nd Division (156th Infantry Division (France)) under Maurice Bailloud, which disembarked in May 1915

- 3rd Metropolitan Brigade
  - 176th Regiment
    - three battalions of metropolitan infantry
  - 2nd Provisional African Regiment
    - composed of three Zouave battalions
- 4th Colonial Brigade
  - 7th Mixed Colonial Regiment
    - mixed composition of two Senegalese battalions and one European battalion
  - 8th Mixed Colonial Regiment
    - mixed composition of two European battalions and one Senegalese battalion
- Divisional Troops
  - Groupe Deslions – 3 batteries (4x 75mm field guns apiece) of the 17th Field Artillery Regiment commanded by Captain Deslions (Note: Dispatched in May 1915 to Gallipoli with the second division)
  - Groupe Mercadier – 3 batteries (4x 75mm field guns apiece) of the 25th Field Artillery Regiment commanded by Captain Mercadier (succeeded by Captain Salin)
  - Groupe Roux – 3 batteries (4x 75mm field guns apiece) of the 47th Field Artillery Regiment commanded by Captain Roux (succeeded by Major Mercadier)
  - Supporting elements for engineering, logistical and medical services

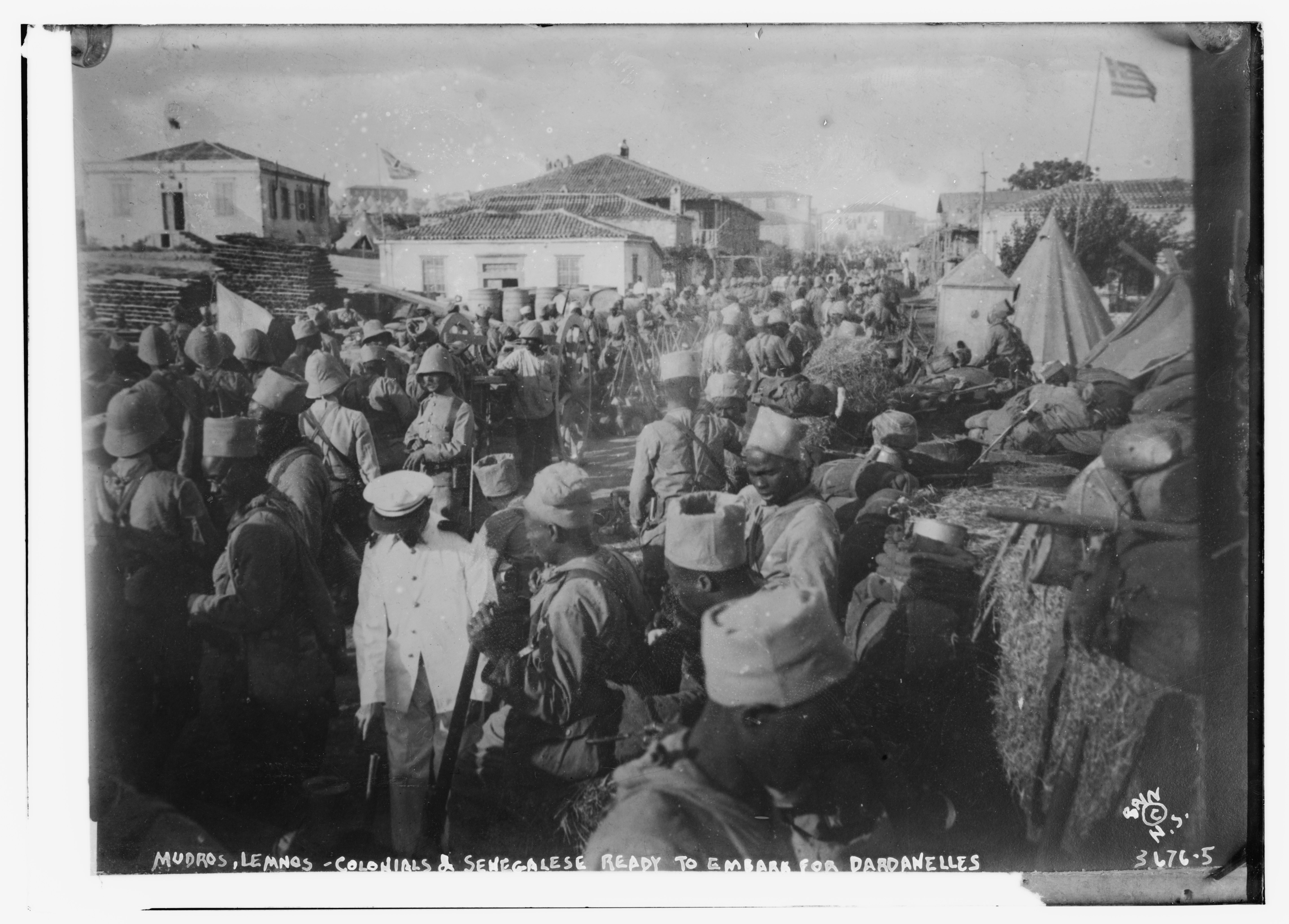
Marsouins (in pith helmets) and Senegalese (in fezzes) ready to embark for Dardanelles

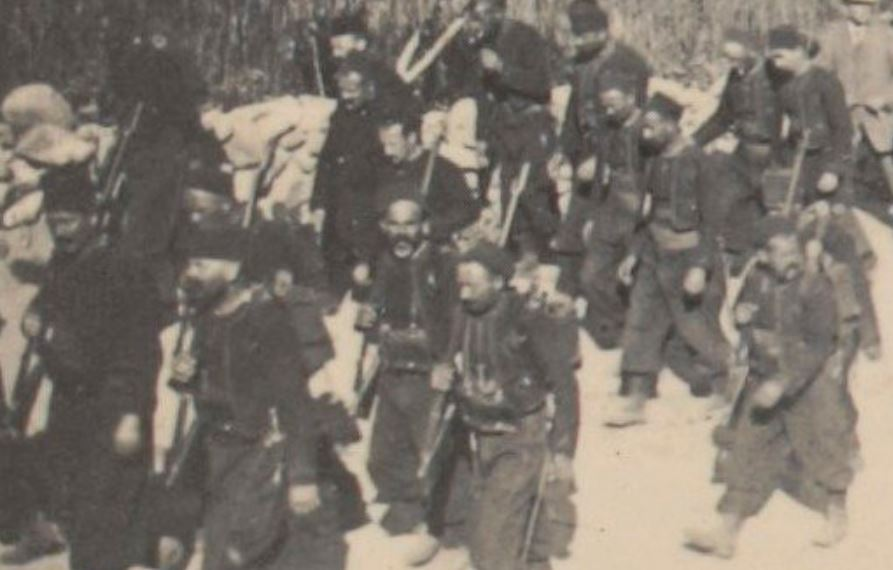
Zouaves ahead of a column of Greek recruits for the French Foreign Legion, training at Lemnos

Corps Troops

- Corps Artillery:
  - 1 Heavy Battery of 120 mm field artillery commanded by Captain Delval
  - 1 Heavy Battery of 155 mm field artillery
  - 1 Heavy Battery of 6x 155 mm howitzers of the 2nd Field Artillery Regiment commanded by Captain Gavois
  - 1 Heavy Battery of 6x 155 mm howitzers of the 48th Field Artillery Regiment commanded by Captain Kolyczko
  - 1 Siege gun battery of 2x Canon de 240 mm mle 1884 sur affût à échantigolles
  - 1 Siege gun battery of 4x 240 mm mle 1876 on a pivoted firing platform
  - Battery of naval guns of 2 Canon de 100 mm Modèle 1891 and 2 Canon de 140 sur affut-truc mle 1884
- Corps Cavalry
  - 4 squadrons of Chasseurs d'Afrique
- Miscellaneous
  - 1 squadron of supply train
  - 4 sections to support the Artillery park
  - 1 field company of Engineers
  - Signallers, comprising two detachments of telegraphists, and one of radio-telegraphy
  - 2 detachments of Military Police
  - Escadrille MF98T situated at Tenedos airfield
  - Rear echelon support units at Mudros base
  - Rear echelon support units at Cape Helles base

== Notes and citations ==
Notes

Citations
