= Megali Sterna =

Megali Sterna Μεγάλη Στέρνα
- Community
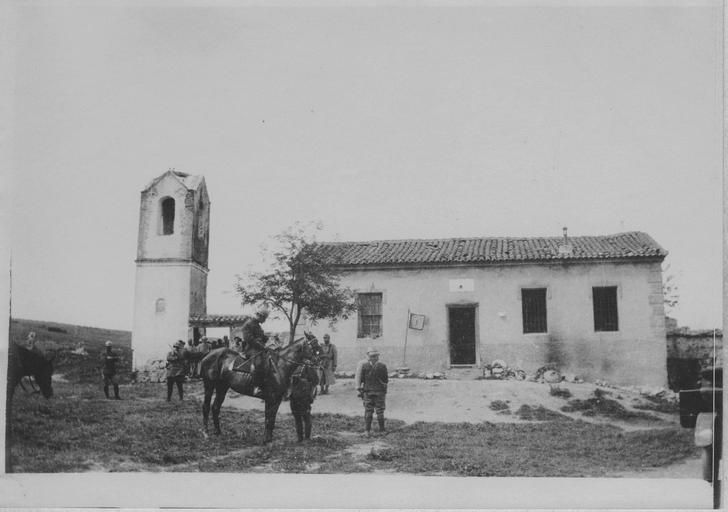
- The church photographed by the French Army in July 1916

- Location within the regional unit

- Location within Greece
- Coordinates: 41°05′29.64″N 22°43′30.64″E
- Country: Greece
- Administrative region: Central Macedonia
- Regional unit: Kilkis
- Municipality: Kilkis
- Municipal unit: Cherso
- Elevation: 125 m (410 ft)

Population (2021)
  - Community: 323
- Time zone: UTC+2 (EET)
  - Summer (DST): UTC+3 (EEST)
- Postal code: 611 00
- Area code: +30 23410
- Vehicle registration: ΚΙ

Megali Sterna (Greek: Μεγάλη Στέρνα, old name: Greek: Τσιγούντσα Cugunci / Tsigountsa) is a village in the Kilkis region of Greece. It is situated in the municipal unit of Cherso, in the Kilkis municipality, within the Kilkis region of Central Macedonia.

== Geography ==
The village is located 20 km northwest of the town of Kilkis, 6 km west of Cherso and 9 km south of Dojran Lake.

The terrain around Megali Sterna is flat to the southeast, but to the northwest it is hilly. The terrain around Megali Sterna slopes south. (Note: Calculated from the variance in all elevation data (DEM 3 ") from Viewfinder Panoramas, within 10 km radius. sv:Lsjbot-algoritmnot) The highest point in the vicinity is 331 metres above sea level, 2.9 km north of Megali Sterna. (Note: Calculated from height data (DEM 3 ") from Viewfinder Panoramas.) Around Megali Sterna it is quite sparsely populated, with 42 inhabitants per square kilometre. The nearest major community is Kilkis, 16.5 km southeast of Megali Sterna. The area around Megali Sterna consists mostly of agricultural land.

The climate in the area is temperate. Average annual temperature in the neighbourhood is 16 °C. The warmest month is July, when the average temperature is 30 °C, and the coldest is January, with 3 °C. Average annual rainfall is 984 millimetres. The wettest month is February, with an average of 137 mm of precipitation, and the driest is August, with 32 mm of precipitation.

Megali Sterna

Climate chart (precipitation, max. and min. temperature)
J	F	M	A	M	J	J	A	S	O	N	D
71 7 −1	137 10 1	77 18 4	112 21 6	85 28 13	69 36 17	47 40 20	32 39 20	103 32 14	56 24 10	79 16 2	116 7 −1
- █ Average max. and min. temperatures in °C
- █ Precipitation totals in mm
Imperial conversion
J	F	M	A	M	J	J	A	S	O	N	D
2.8 45 30	5.4 50 34	3 64 39	4.4 70 43	3.3 82 55	2.7 97 63	1.9 104 68	1.3 102 68	4.1 90 57	2.2 75 50	3.1 61 36	4.6 45 30
- █ Average max. and min. temperatures in °F
- █ Precipitation totals in inches

As per the Kallikratis plan, this village, together with Michalitsi and Soultogianneika, constitute the local community of Megali Sterna, which belongs to the municipal unit of Cherso in the municipality of Kilkis. According to the 2021 census has a population of 323 permanent residents.

== History ==
=== In the Ottoman Empire ===
In the 19th century Chuguntsi was a Bulgarian village in the Demirhisar Kaza of the Sanjak of Serres of the Ottoman Empire. In the "Ethnography of the Provinces of Adrianople, Monastir and Thessaloniki", published in Constantinople in 1878 and reflecting the statistics of the male population from 1873, Chiguntsi (Tchigountzi) is listed as a settlement with 368 Bulgarians in 70 households.

According to the statistics of Vasil Kanchov ("Macedonia. Ethnography and Statistics") in 1900 Chuguntsi was a village in Dojran said with 250 Bulgarian Christian inhabitants.

The population of the village is under the rule of the Bulgarian Exarchate. According to the secretary of the Exarchate Dimitar Mishev (" La Macedoine et sa Population Chrétienne ") in 1905 Chuguntsi (Tchougountzi) is a village in Kilkis said with 400 Bulgarian exarchists and a Bulgarian school.

At the outbreak of the Balkan War in 1912, two people from Chuguntsi were volunteers in the Macedonian-Edirne militia.

=== In Greece ===
After the Second Balkan War, Cugunci came under Greek sovereignty. The Cugunci Sector of the Macedonian front was the scene of fighting between the Bulgarians and the Entente forces dominated by the Armée d'Orient (1915–1919). A number of photos from this time have survived.

In 1913, after the Second Balkan War, the village was in Greece. Its population emigrated to Bulgaria and was replaced by Greek refugees who were resettled there. In 1926 the village was renamed Megali Sterna. Pontian refugees from Varkenes in the Kars region of Turkey settled in the village. In 1928, the population of the village was entirely refugee with 124 families and 445 refugees.

To the north of the village is the church of the Exaltation of the Holy Cross which is a post-Byzantine three-aisled basilica of the middle of the 19th century and has been characterised as a monument in need of special state preservation. The Church of the Exaltation of the Holy Cross from the middle of the 19th century was declared a historical monument on June 27, 1987.

== Notes and citations ==
Notes

Citations
