= Plagia, Kilkis =

Plagia Πλαγιά
- Community
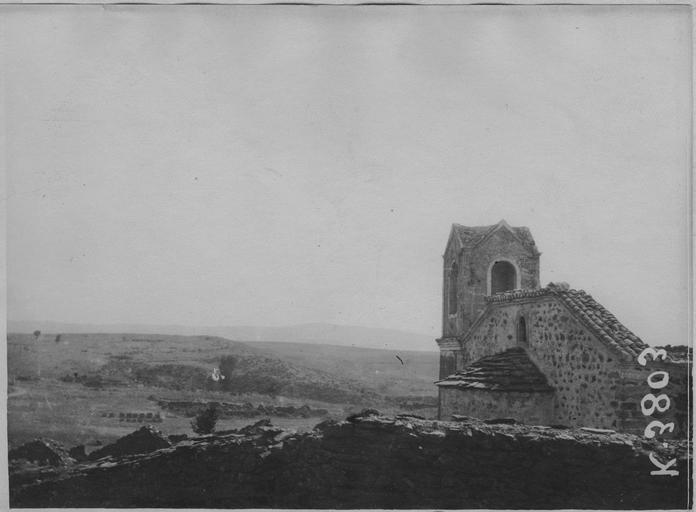
- The church photographed by the French Army in August 1916

- Location within the regional unit

- Location within Greece
- Coordinates: 41°06′13.08″N 22°50′49.24″E
- Country: Greece
- Administrative region: Central Macedonia
- Regional unit: Kilkis
- Municipality: Kilkis
- Municipal unit: Cherso
- Elevation: 220 m (720 ft)

Population (2021)
  - Community: 615
- Time zone: UTC+2 (EET)
  - Summer (DST): UTC+3 (EEST)
- Postal code: 610 02
- Area code: +30 23410
- Vehicle registration: ΚΙ

Plagia (Greek: Πλαγιά, old name: Greek: Ουσουσλού Ususlu / Boguklu) is a village and a community in the Kilkis region of Greece. It is situated in the municipal unit of Cherso, in the Kilkis municipality, within the Kilkis region of Central Macedonia. The community consists of the villages Plagia, Koromilia and Agia Kyriaki.

== Geography ==
The village is located 15 km north of Kilkis in the Thessaloniki plain. Cherso is 6 km to the west, and Koromilia is 3 km to the south, with Milochori 4 km to the east.

The terrain around Plagia is hilly to the northeast, but to the southwest it is flat. (Note: Calculated from the variance in all elevation data (DEM 3 ") from Viewfinder Panoramas, within 10 km radius. sv:Lsjbot-algoritmnot) The highest point nearby is 438 metres above sea level, 1.5 km east of Plagia. (Note: Calculated from height data (DEM 3 ") from Viewfinder Panoramas.) Around Plagia it is quite sparsely populated, with 40 inhabitants per square kilometre. The nearest major community is Kilkis, 12.6 km south of Plagia. The area around Plagia consists mostly of agricultural land.

The climate in the area is temperate . Average annual temperature in the neighbourhood is 15 °C . The warmest month is August, when the average temperature is 28 °C, and the coldest is December, with 2 °C. Average annual rainfall is 984 millimetres. The wettest month is February, with an average of 137 mm of precipitation, and the driest is August, with 32 mm of precipitation.

== Notes and citations ==
Notes

Citations
