= Maurice Bailloud =

French general (1847–1921)

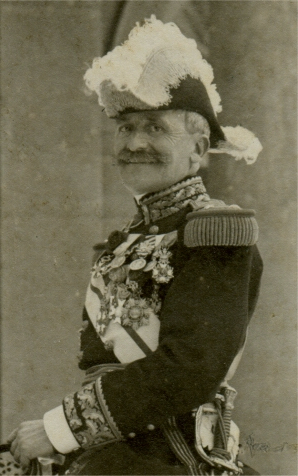
Maurice Bailloud

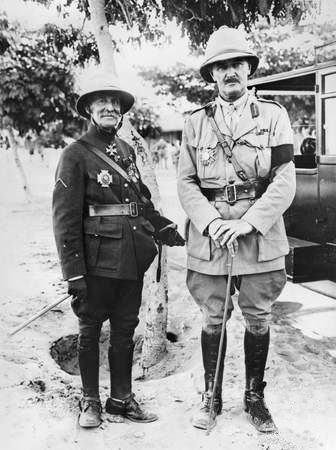
Bailloud and Allenby in Palestine (1917)

Maurice Camille Bailloud (Tours, 13 October 1847 – 1 July 1921) was a French general.

== Career ==
He was the son of Ennemond Henri Bailloud, a Navy lieutenant, and Virginie Marie Marchand. He studied from 1866 at the École spéciale militaire de Saint-Cyr and graduated on 5 October 1868. He participated in the Franco-Prussian War (1870–1871). In 1879, he married with Marie Chambert and had 4 children.

He participated in the Second Madagascar expedition as Chief of staff of the French Expeditionary force under command of Jacques Duchesne. In 1900, he was sent to China as commander of the 2nd Infantry Brigade to suppress the Boxer Rebellion.

Promoted to Division General, he was stationed in Algeria from 1902 to 1906. He became commander of the XX Army Corps (1906), the XVI Army Corps (1907) and the XIX Army Corps (1907). He went in retirement in 1912.

== World War I ==
Aged 67 at the outbreak of World War I, he was recalled and became commander of the 17th and later the 10th Military District. In March 1915, he received command of the new 156th Infantry Division, which was to be sent to Gallipoli as part of the Corps expéditionnaire d'Orient. When the commander of the Corps, Henri Gouraud, was wounded on 30 June 1915, Bailloud replaced him at the head of the Corps. In October 1915, he was sent with his division to establish a new front against the Central Powers in Northern Greece after their conquest of Serbia.

He remained there until he was moved to the reserve on 26 August 1916. In April 1917, he was appointed Inspector-General of the French troops in Egypt, Palestine and Cyprus. He died in 1921 after a plane crash at Bar-le-Duc.

== Notes ==
- http://www.ecole-superieure-de-guerre.fr/nb-maurice-camille-bailloud.html
