= Pribilci =

Pribilci Прибилци
- Village
- Air view of the village

- Location within North Macedonia
- Coordinates: 41.272445°N 21.202130°E
- Country: North Macedonia
- Region: Pelagonia
- Municipality: Demir Hisar

Population (2002)
  - Total: 266
- Time zone: UTC+1 (CET)
  - Summer (DST): UTC+2 (CEST)
- Website: .

Pribilci (Прибилци) is a village in the municipality of Demir Hisar, North Macedonia.

== Demographics ==
Pribilci is attested in the Ottoman defter of 1467/68 as a village in the vilayet of Manastir, consisting of 35 households, 5 bachelors and 4 widows. The inhabitants attested mostly bore Slavic names, with a minority carrying Albanian ones, such as Bojko son of Gon or Gerg son of Todor.

In statistics gathered by Vasil Kanchov in 1900, the village of Pribilci was inhabited by 450 Muslim Albanians.

According to the 2002 census, the village had a total of 266 inhabitants. Ethnic groups in the village include:

- Macedonians 266
