= Armée d'Orient (1915–1919) =

French Army in WW1

The Armée d'Orient (AO) was a field army of the French Army during World War I who fought on the Macedonian front.

The Armée d'Orient was formed in September 1915 during the Conquest of Serbia by German-Austrian-Bulgarian forces. It was shipped to the Greek port of Salonika, where its first units arrived on 5 October. Despite several offensives, the front stabilized on the Greek-Serbian border until September 1918, when the Bulgarian army disintegrated after defeat in the Battle of Dobro Pole.

On 11 August 1916, all allied troops on the Salonika front came under a united command, and named Allied Army of the Orient (AAO). The AAO supreme commander became the French commander of the Armée d'Orient Maurice Sarrail. He was succeeded as commander of the Armée d'Orient by Victor Cordonnier, and the army itself was renamed the Armée française d'Orient (AFO).

== Commanders ==
- General Maurice Sarrail (5 October 1915 – 11 August 1916)
- General Victor Cordonnier (11 August 1916 – 19 October 1916)
- General Paul Leblois (19 October 1916 – 1 February 1917)
- General Paul François Grossetti (1 February 1917 – 30 September 1917)
- General Charles Louis Jacques Régnault (30 September 1917 – 31 December 1917)
- General Paul Prosper Henrys (31 December 1917 – April 1919)

== Units ==
- 156th Infantry Division (France) (since October 1915), was formerly part of the Corps expéditionnaire d'Orient
- 57th Infantry Division (since October–November 1915)
- 122nd Infantry Division (since October–November 1915)
- 17th Colonial Infantry Division (France) (since February 1916), was formerly part of the Corps Expeditionnaire des Dardanelles (Note: General Jean César Graziani, as Chief of the General Staff of the French Army, was asked to provide statistical information, in respect of in the Gallipoli and Salonika campaigns, to highlight French participation in these theatres of war to the Russians. As at 17 August 1916, French forces comprised 3,075 officers, 113,000 other ranks, 45,593 horses & mules, 6,954 carriages and 1,110 automobiles.)
- 30th Infantry Division (France) (fr:30e division d'infanterie (France)) (since September–December 1916)
- fr:76e division d'infanterie (France) (since September–December 1916)
- 11th Colonial Infantry Division (since September–December 1916)
- 16th Colonial Infantry Division (since September–December 1916)
- Cavalry component
    - A Groupe Léger of six dismounted light cavalry squadrons, which equated to the strength of an infantry battalion. (Note: The Groupe Léger formation comprised six dismounted cavalry squadrons) (One squadron was from the 11th Hussar Regiment (France), the remainder were from the 3rd, 13th, 17th, 18th and 22nd regiments of Chasseurs à cheval.) This formation arrived in 1915 and was disbanded on 15 June 1917, its personnel being transferred to the depot of the 4th Regiment of Chasseurs d'Afrique.
    - 4 squadrons of Chasseurs d'Afrique, redeployed from Gallipoli. Disembarked at Salonika on 13 October 1915, the unit was disbanded on 10 December 1917. Its men were absorbed into the three cavalry regiments of the Jouinot-Gambetta brigade.
  - A cavalry brigade formed in 1917. The brigade was commanded by François Léon Jouinot-Gambetta
    - fr:4e régiment de chasseurs d'Afrique disembarked in November 1915.
    - fr:1er régiment de chasseurs d'Afrique disembarked in February 1916.
    - régiment de marche de spahis marocains (RMSM) disembarked in March 1917.
  - A provisional regiment of Zouaves attached to the cavalry, with the division provisoire Venel They were subsequently in the 11th Colonial Division (November 1916 to May 1917), but never fought as a part of that Division.
- Escadrille N.391

== After World War I ==
After the victory against Bulgaria in the autumn of 1918, the AFO is divided in 3 parts :

=== Army of the Danube ===
- Army of the Danube (AD), created on 28 October 1918, operated in Romania and the Crimea. Commanded by :
  - Henri Mathias Berthelot (until 5 May 1919)
  - Jean César Graziani (until January 1920)
    - Under the orders of General d'Anselme, French and allied elements were transported to Odessa at the end of December as part of the Southern Russia intervention. In April 1919, they were evacuated from Odessa and Sevastopol, and redeployed to occupy a sector next to the Dnieper.
    - It was primarily composed of the 30th, 76th and 156th Infantry Divisions, along with the 16th Colonial Infantry Division. It was supported by 26th Division (United Kingdom) until 15 December 1918 and the Greek Archipelago Division.

=== Army of Hungary ===
- Army of Hungary (AH), created on 1 March 1919 and dissolved on 31 August 1919. Commanded by
  - Paul-Joseph de Lobit

=== Corps for the Occupation of Constantinople ===
- Expeditionary corps for the Occupation of Constantinople (COC). Commanded by
  - Louis Franchet d'Esperey (November 1918 – January 1919)
  - Albert Defrance (February 1919 – December 1920)
  - Maurice Pellé (1921 – 22 October 1923)

== Gallery ==
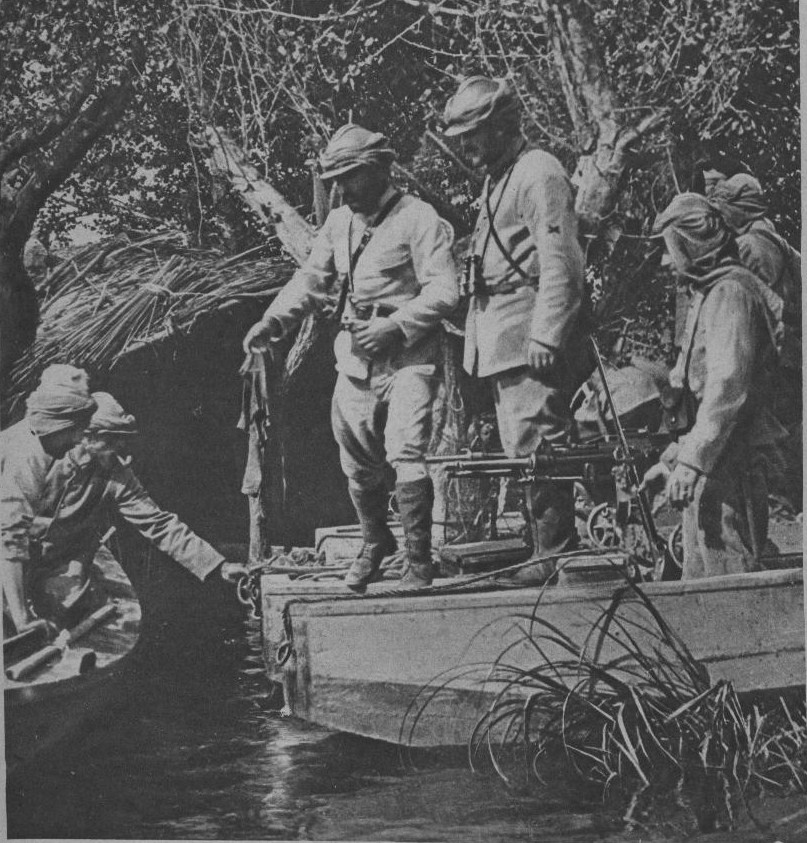
A patrol on the Vardar in September 1916

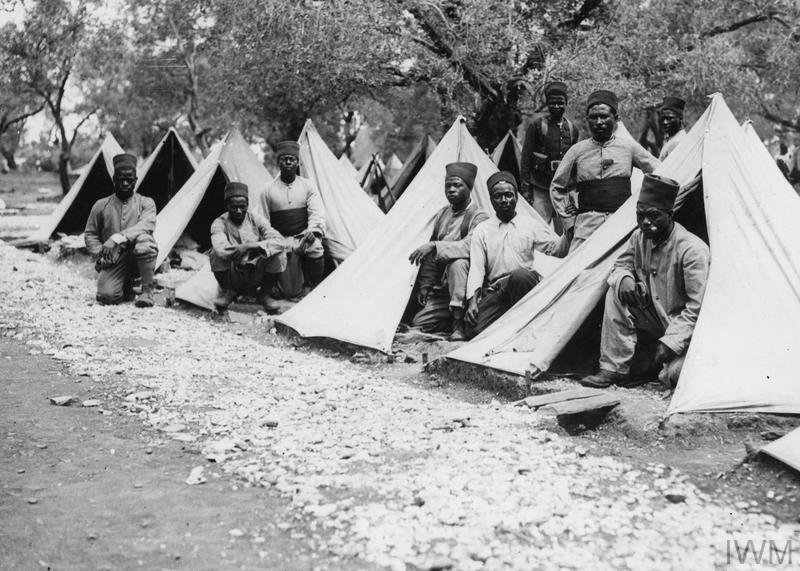
French colonial troops from Madagascar resting outside tents in their camp, October 1917, Salonika front.

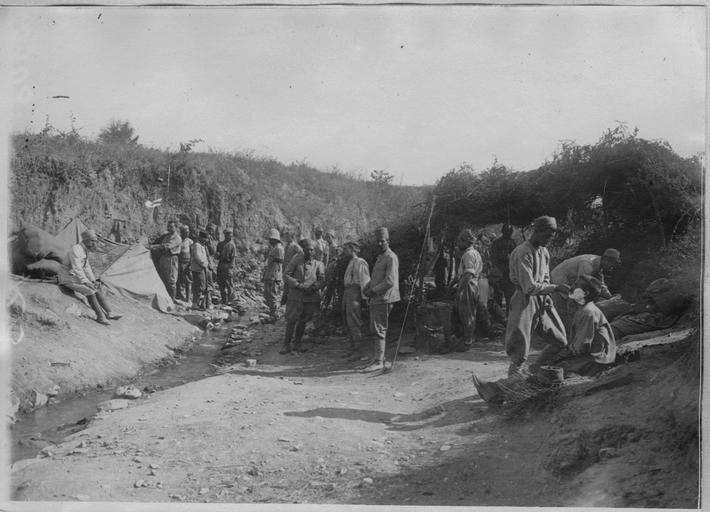
Zouaves of the 156th Division in the ravine of Hill 420 in the Cugunci sector, July 1916.

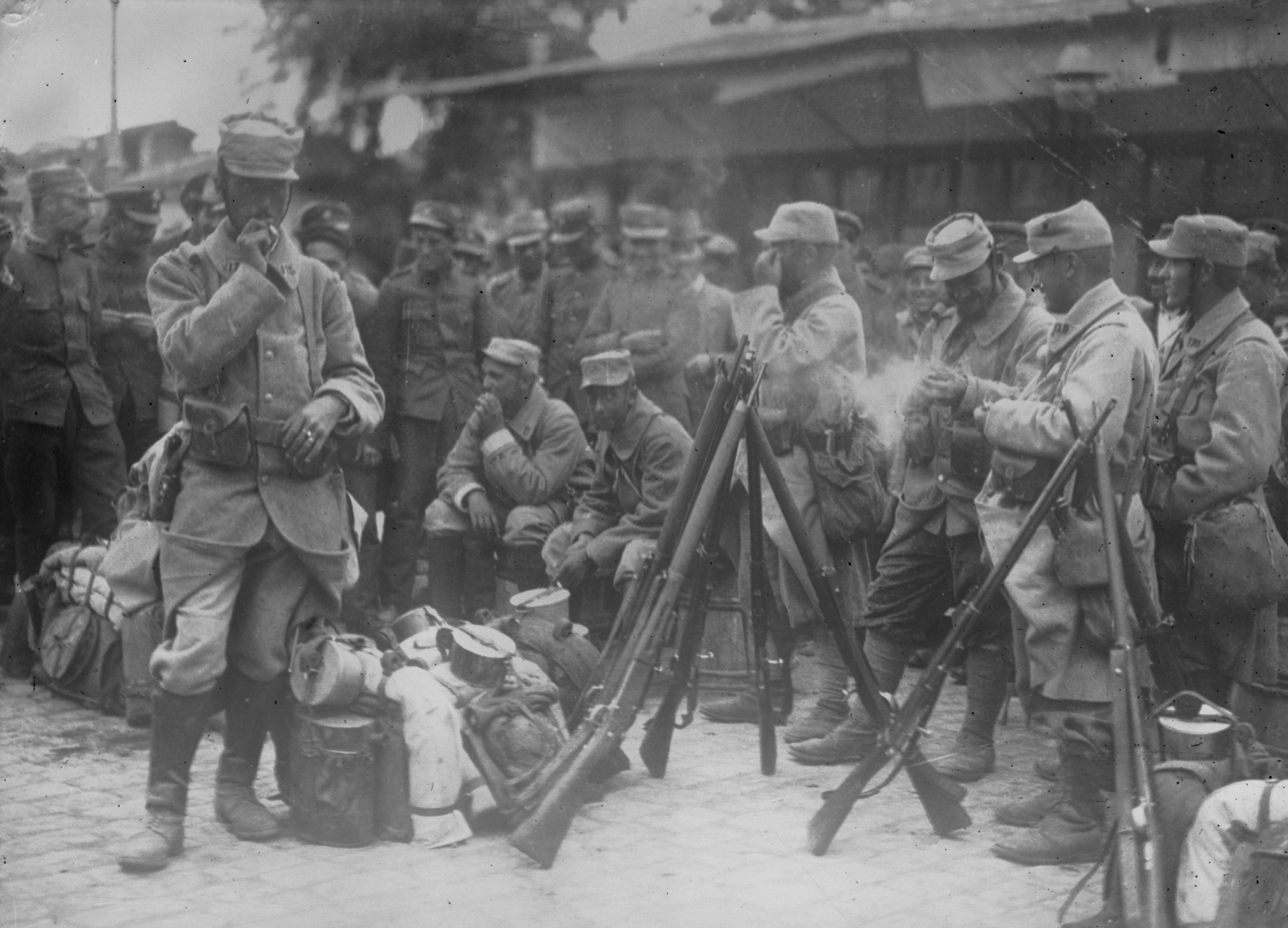
Soldiers of the 175th Infantry Regiment at Salonika in 1915

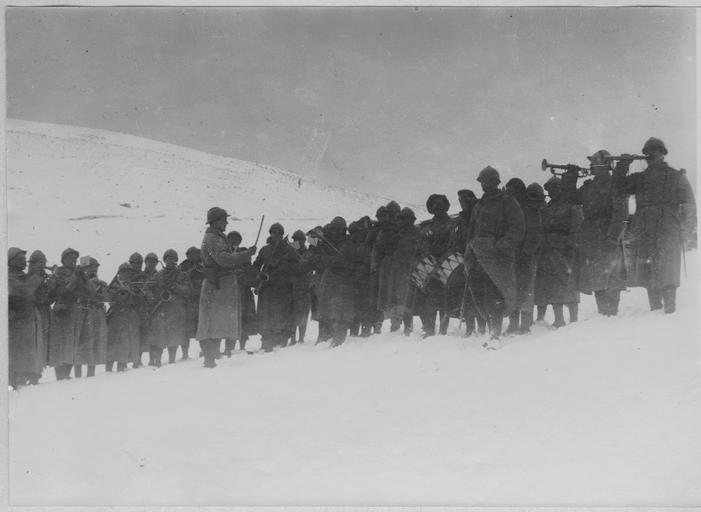
The band of the 84th infantry, on the Livadia front, to the west of the Vardar on 20 January 1917.

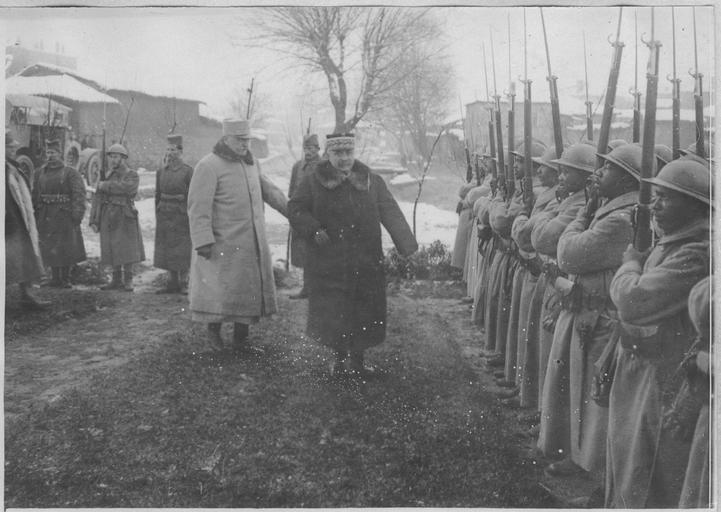
Review of Senegalese Tirailleurs by General Guillaumat. Photo taken at the village of Vatokhorion, in the municipality of Florina in Greece, on 7 March 1918.

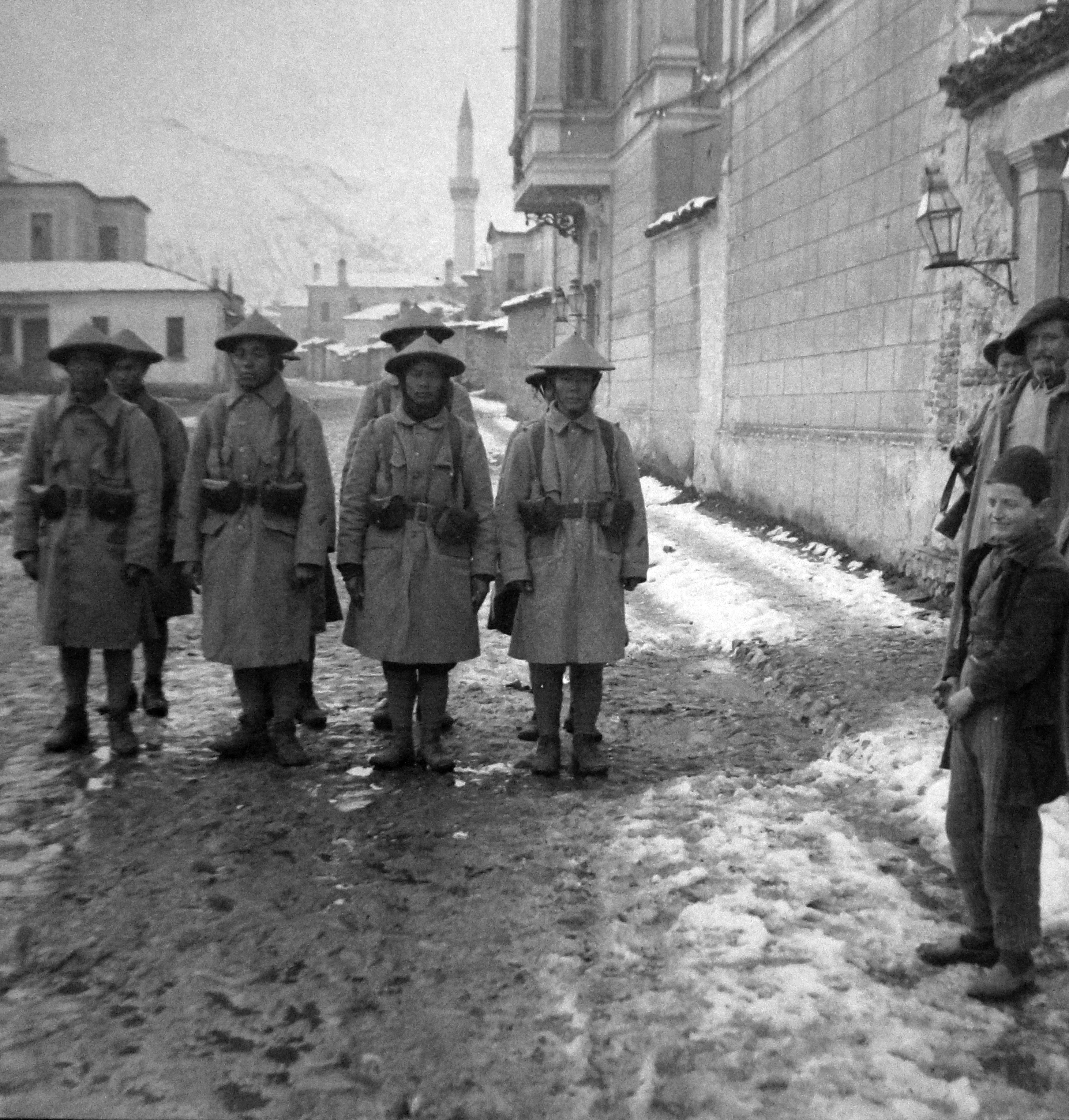
Tirailleurs indochinois from Vietnam in the Autonomous Province of Korçë in Albania in January 1917.

== See also ==
- List of French armies in WWI
