= Cherso =

Cherso Χέρσο
- Municipal unit
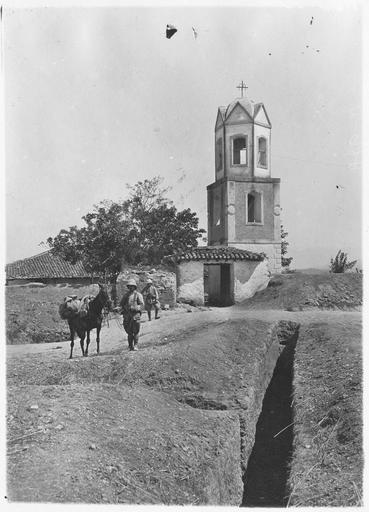
- The church photographed by the French Army in July 1916

- Location within the regional unit

- Location within Greece
- Coordinates: 41°05′N 22°47′E
- Country: Greece
- Administrative region: Central Macedonia
- Regional unit: Kilkis
- Municipality: Kilkis
- Municipal unit: Cherso

Area
  - Municipal unit: 157.9 km^{2} (61.0 sq mi)

Population (2021)
  - Municipal unit: 2,078
  - Municipal unit density: 13.16/km^{2} (34.08/sq mi)
  - Community: 872
- Time zone: UTC+2 (EET)
  - Summer (DST): UTC+3 (EEST)
- Postal code: 610 02
- Vehicle registration: ΚΙ

Cherso (Greek: Χέρσο, old name: Greek: Χέρσοβο Bulgarian: Хърсово Hersovo / Hirsova) is a village in the Kilkis region of Greece. It is situated in the municipal unit of Cherso, in the Kilkis municipality, within the Kilkis region of Central Macedonia.

In 19th century the village was populated by Orthodox Christian Slavs, which were called Bulgarians by Bulgarian ethnogrtapher Vasil Kanchov.

Since the 2011 local government reform (Kallikratis Plan), it has been part of the municipality Kilkis, of which it is a municipal unit. The municipal unit has an area of 157.907 km^{2}. Population 2,078 (2021). In the municipal unit of Cherso lies the historical village of Kalindria.

In the area of Tumba Hrisafi, 1200 m northwest of the village, an ancient settlement was discovered, declared in 1996 a protected monument.

== Transport ==
The settlement is served by Hersos railway station, with services to Thessaloniki, Serres and Alexandroupoli.
