= Bulgarian Front of First Balkan War =

1912–1913 conflict

Bulgarian Front
- Part of the First Balkan War
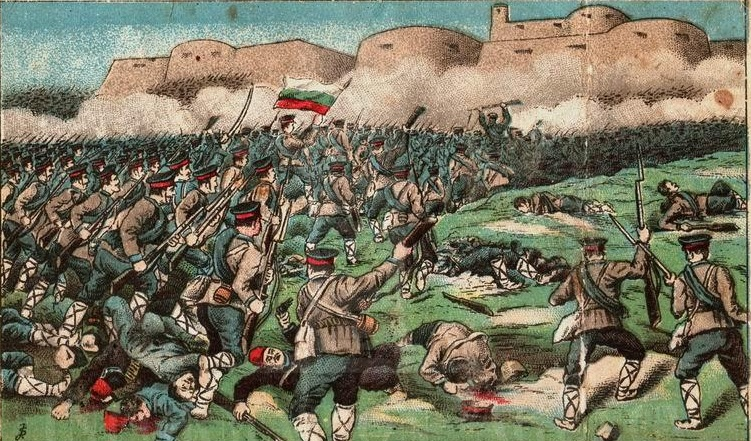
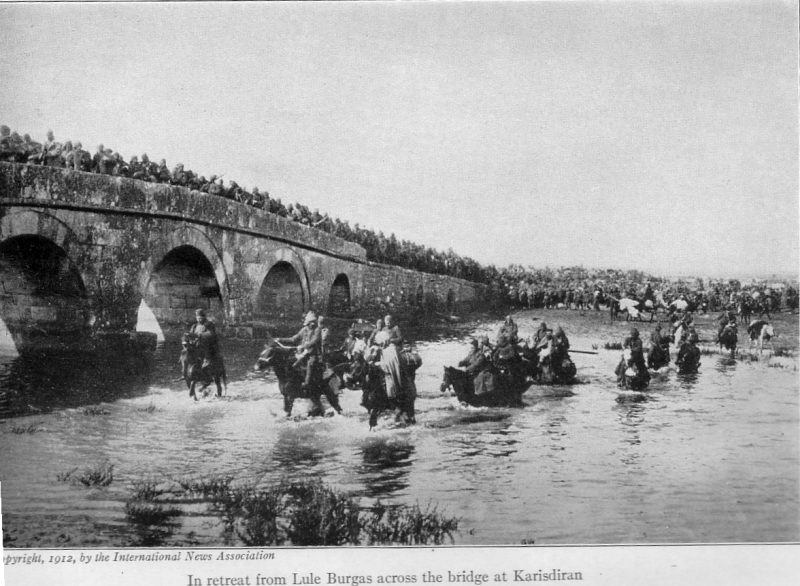
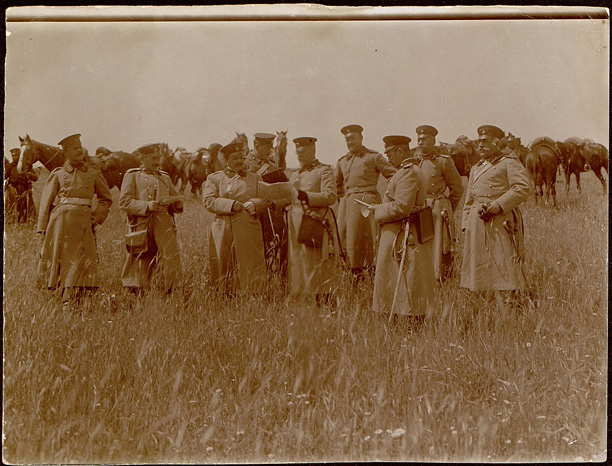
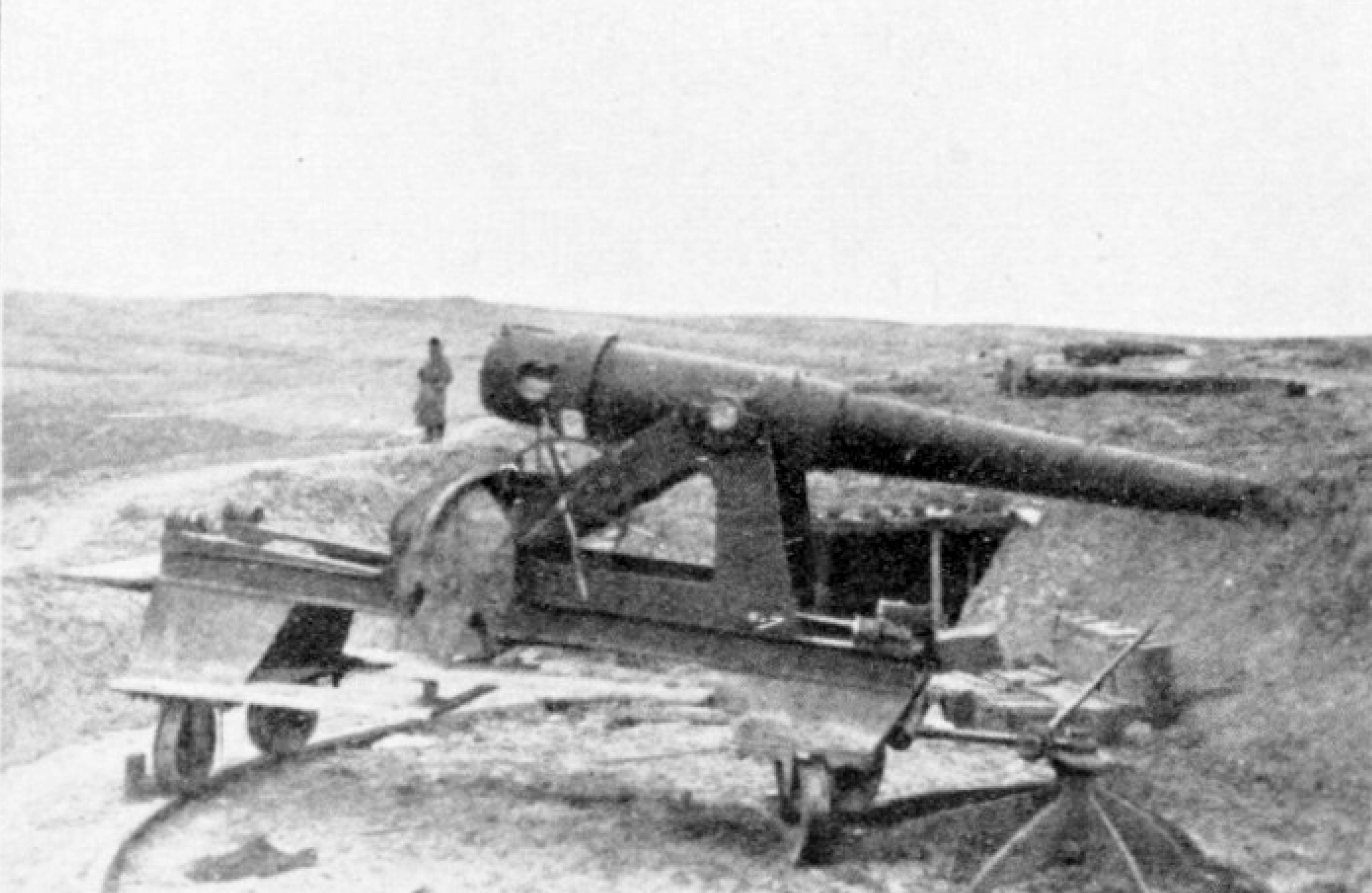
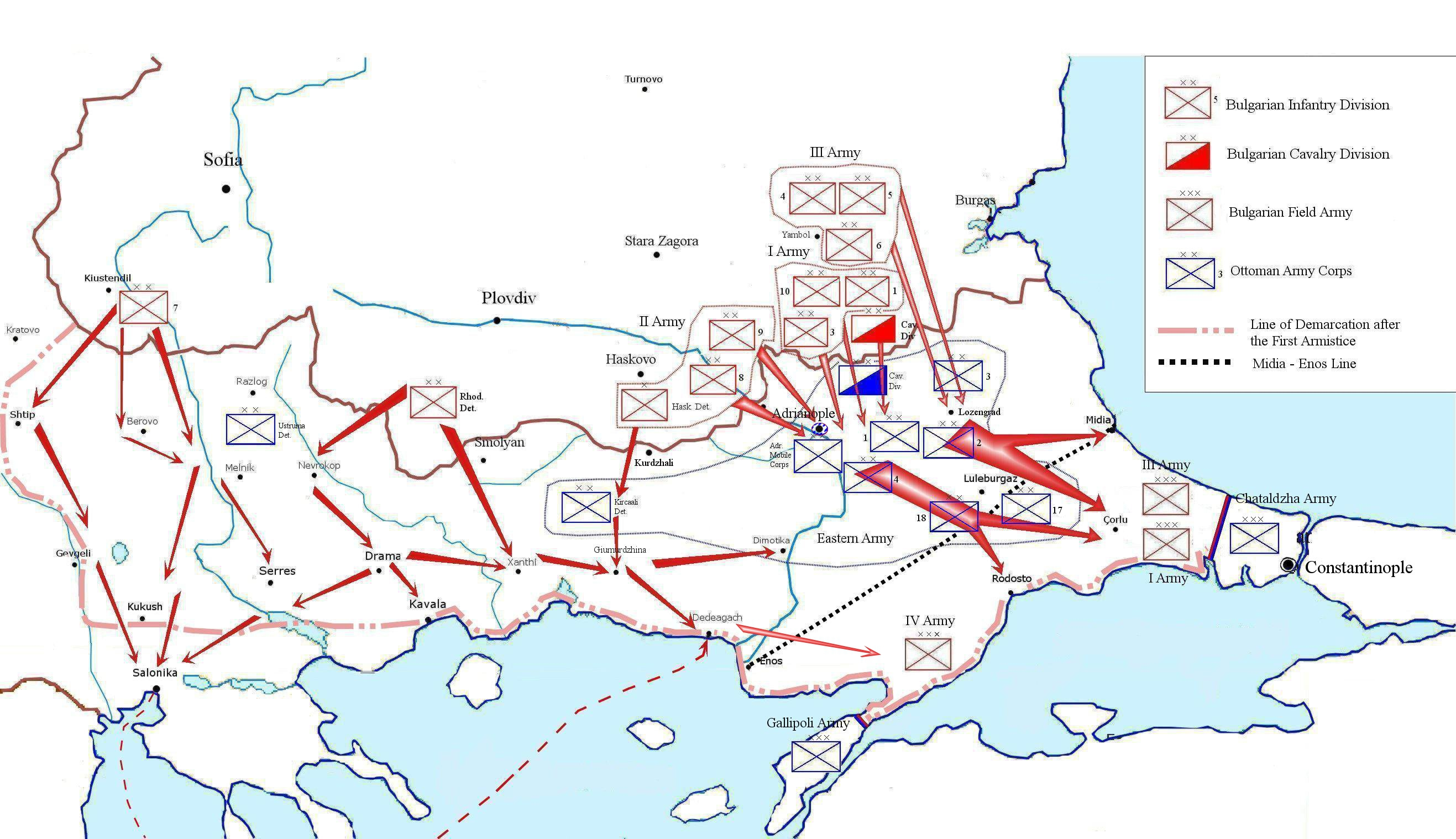
- Clockwise from top left: An illustration of the Battle of Lozengrad in the Balkan Wars.; Ottoman troops in retreat from Lule Burgas across the bridge at Karisdiran; Radko Dimitriev and his staff at Catalca; Captured Ottoman artillery in Adrianople; Operations of the Bulgarian Army in the First Balkan War
Date	17 October 1912 – 16 April 1913
Location	Thrace, Macedonia, Rhodope Mountains
Result	Bulgarian victory; Treaty of London (1913)

Belligerents
(Tsardom of Bulgaria (1908–1946)) Bulgaria	Ottoman Empire

Commanders and leaders
(Bulgaria) Ferdinand I (Bulgaria) Mihail Savov (Bulgaria) Ivan Fichev (Bulgaria) Vasil Kutinchev (Bulgaria) Nikola Ivanov (Bulgaria) Radko Dimitriev (Bulgaria) Stiliyan Kovachev (Bulgaria) Georgi Todorov	Mehmed V Shevket Pasha; Enver Pasha; Nazım Pasha; Abdullah Pasha; Ali Rıza Pasha; Şükrü Pasha (POW); Mahmud Pasha (WIA)

Strength
(Tsardom of Bulgaria (1908–1946)) 400,000+ men	400,000+ men

Casualties and losses
Bulgaria: 87,926 casualties; 14,000 killed; 19,000 dead of disease; 50,000 wounded; 4,926 missing	130,000 casualties

The Bulgarian Front comprised two main theatres of military operations between the Tsardom of Bulgaria and the Ottoman Empire during the First Balkan War. Fighting took place primarily in Thrace, where Bulgarian forces launched a large-scale offensive against the Ottoman army. In Macedonia, the 7th Rila Division supported Serbian operations and advanced as far as Thessaloniki, while the Bulgarian Haskovo and Kardzhali detachments conducted operations in the Rhodope Mountains and Western Thrace. The campaign included one of the largest military engagements fought in Europe since the Franco-Prussian War. The Thracian theatre of operations played the decisive role in the Ottoman Empire's defeat in the First Balkan War.

== Background ==
Tensions among the Balkan states over their rival aspirations to the provinces of Ottoman-controlled Rumelia (Eastern Rumelia, Thrace and Macedonia) subsided somewhat after the mid-19th-century intervention by the Great Powers, which aimed to secure both more complete protection for the provinces' Christian majority as well as to maintain the status quo. By 1867, Serbia and Montenegro had both secured their independence, which was confirmed by the Treaty of Berlin (1878). The question of the viability of Ottoman rule was revived after the Young Turk Revolution in July 1908, which compelled the Ottoman Sultan to restore the suspended constitution of the empire.

Serbia's aspirations to take over Bosnia and Herzegovina were thwarted by the Bosnian crisis, which led to the Austrian annexation of the province in October 1908. The Serbs then directed their war efforts to the south. After the annexation, the Young Turks tried to induce the Muslim population of Bosnia to emigrate to the Ottoman Empire. The Ottoman authorities resettled those who took up the offer in districts of northern Macedonia with few Muslims. The experiment proved to be a catastrophe since the immigrants readily united with the existing population of Albanian Muslims and participated in the series of 1911 Albanian uprisings and the Albanian revolt of 1912. Some Albanian government troops switched sides.

In May 1912, Albanian rebels seeking national autonomy and the re-installment of Sultan Abdul Hamid II to power drove the Young Turkish forces out of Skopje and pressed south towards Manastir (now Bitola), forcing the Young Turks to grant effective autonomy over large regions in June 1912. Serbia, which had helped the arming of Catholic Albanians in the Mirditë region and Hamidian rebels and sent secret agents to some of the prominent leaders, took the revolt as a pretext for war. Serbia, Montenegro, Greece, and Bulgaria had all been in talks about possible offensives against the Ottoman Empire before the 1912 Albanian revolt had broken out, and a formal agreement between Serbia and Montenegro had been signed on 7 March. On 18 October 1912, King Peter I of Serbia issued a declaration, 'To the Serbian People,' which appeared to support Albanians as well as Serbs:

The Turkish governments showed no interest in their duties towards their citizens and turned a deaf ear to all complaints and suggestions. Things got so far out of hand that no one was satisfied with the situation in Turkey in Europe. It also became unbearable for the Serbs, the Greeks, and the Albanians. By the grace of God, I have therefore ordered my brave army to join in the Holy War to free our brethren and to wish for a better future. In Old Serbia, my army will meet not only upon Christian Serbs but also upon Muslim Serbs, who are equally dear to us, and in addition to them, upon Christian and Muslim Albanians with whom our people have shared joy and sorrow for thirteen centuries now. To all of them, we bring freedom, brotherhood and equality.

In a search for allies, Serbia was ready to negotiate a treaty with Bulgaria. The agreement provided that in the event of victory against the Ottomans, Bulgaria would receive all of Macedonia south of the Kriva Palanka–Ohrid line. Bulgaria accepted Serbia's expansion as being to the north of the Shar Mountains (Kosovo). The intervening area was agreed to be "disputed" and would be arbitrated by the Tsar of Russia in the event of a successful war against the Ottoman Empire. During the war, it became apparent that the Albanians did not consider Serbia as a liberator, as had been suggested by King Peter I, and the Serbian forces failed to observe his declaration of amity toward Albanians.

After the successful coup d'état for unification with Eastern Rumelia, Bulgaria began to dream that its national unification would be realized. For that purpose, it developed a large army and was identified as the "Prussia of the Balkans". However, Bulgaria could not win a war alone against the Ottomans.

In Greece, Hellenic Army officers had rebelled in the Goudi coup of August 1909 and secured the appointment of a progressive government under Eleftherios Venizelos, which they hoped would resolve the Crete question in Greece's favour. They also wanted to reverse their defeat in the Greco-Turkish War (1897) by the Ottomans. An emergency military reorganization, led by a French military mission, had been started for that purpose, but its work was interrupted by the outbreak of war in the Balkans. In the discussions that led to Greece joining the Balkan League, Bulgaria refused to commit to any agreement on distributing territorial gains, unlike its deal with Serbia over Macedonia. Bulgaria's diplomatic policy was to push Serbia into one that limited its access to Macedonia while simultaneously refusing any such agreement with Greece. Bulgaria believed that its army could occupy the big part of Aegean Macedonia and the port city of Salonica (Thessaloniki) before the Greeks could do so.

In 1911, Italy had launched an invasion of Tripolitania, now in Libya, which was quickly followed by the occupation of the Dodecanese Islands in the Aegean Sea. The Italians' decisive military victories over the Ottoman Empire and the successful 1912 Albanian revolt encouraged the Balkan states to imagine that they might win a war against the Ottomans. By the spring and summer of 1912, the various Christian Balkan nations had created a network of military alliances, becoming known as the Balkan League.

The Great Powers, most notably France and Austria-Hungary, reacted to the formation of the alliances by trying unsuccessfully to dissuade the Balkan League from going to war. In late September, the League and the Ottoman Empire mobilized their armies. Montenegro was the first to declare war on 25 September (O.S.)/8 October. After issuing an impossible ultimatum to the Ottoman Porte on 13 October, Bulgaria, Serbia and Greece declared war on the Ottomans on 17 October (1912). The declarations of war attracted a large number of war correspondents. An estimated 200 to 300 journalists from around the world covered the war in the Balkans in November 1912.

== Order of battle and plans ==
=== Bulgaria ===
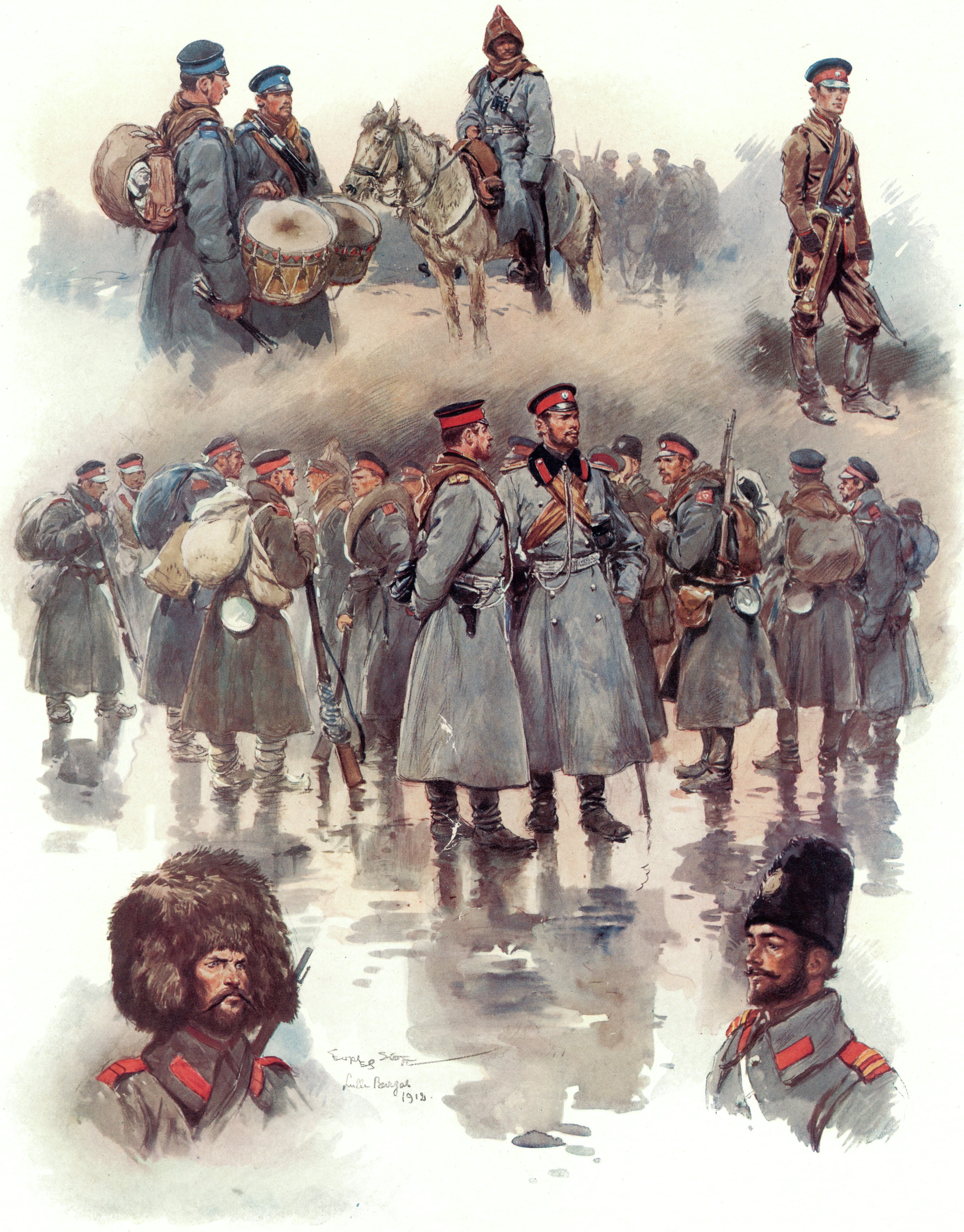
Bulgarian soldiers of the Balkan Wars

Bulgaria was militarily the most powerful of the four Balkan states, with a large, well-trained, well-equipped army. The Bulgarian Army had mobilized in good order and organization a total of 599,879 soldiers and non-commissioned officers and 6,757 officers. A shortage of around 4,813 officers was filled by reserve and non-commissioned officers. At that time, the non-commissioned officers amounted to 48,102 men. The Bulgarian field army counted for nine infantry divisions and one cavalry division. The artillery pieces of the Bulgarian Army amounted to 1,103 guns with 835,435 shells in total. These guns were diverse in type and calibre, consisting of Russian, German and French guns. Only half of them were modern quick-firing systems. The others were old models, without recoil mechanisms and heavily worn out. The lack of spare parts made their repair and maintenance difficult. The Macedonian and Thracian refugee communities developed a broad volunteer movement throughout Bulgaria. This led to the formation of the Macedonian-Adrianopolitan Volunteer Corps, with a strength of 14,670 men, under the command of Nikola Genev.

The Main Command of the Bulgarian Army consisted of the Headquarters of the Active Army and the Main Directorate. Tsar Ferdinand I was the commander-in-chief, but did not actively command the army, and created the post of Assistant to the Commander-in-Chief, to which Lieutenant General Mihail Savov was appointed. Major General Ivan Fichev served as Chief of Staff. The Bulgarian navy and river fleets included six 98-ton torpedo boats, a training cruiser called “Nadezhda” and other small vessels. The protection of the Black Sea coast was the main purpose of the Bulgarian navy, as well as the prevention of an Ottoman blockade that might disrupt the important connection to Russia.

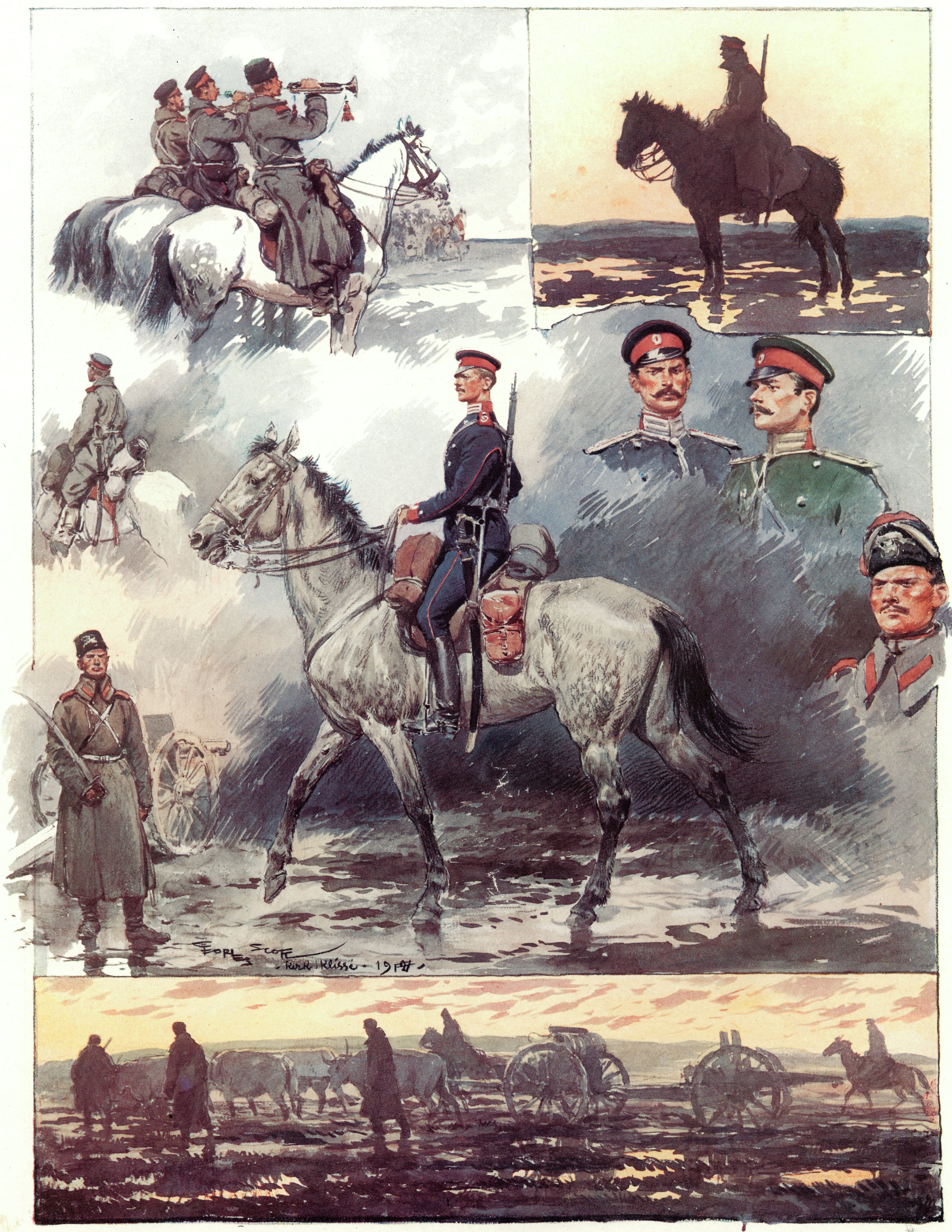
Bulgarian cavalry of the Balkan Wars

The Bulgarian plan envisaged that 80% of the Bulgarian Field Army (350,000 men, 750 guns and 230 machine guns) would deliver the main blow in Eastern Thrace along the Lozengrad–Babaeski direction. The aim was to press the Ottoman Army between the Maritsa and Ergene rivers and in this way block or destroy them before the intervention of the European powers could stop the conflict. The remaining 20% of the Field Army: the Haskovo and Rhodope detachments, as well as the 7th Rila Division (which was part of the Second Allied Army), were assigned to destroy the Ottoman forces deployed in the Rhodopes and in the valleys of the Mesta and Struma rivers and also for operations toward Thessaloniki. The remaining forces were left in reserve and concentrated in regions of Bulgaria with a compact Turkish population.

It deployed its main force in Thrace by forming three armies. The First Army (79,370 men), under General Vasil Kutinchev, had three infantry divisions and was deployed to the south of Yambol and assigned operations along the Tundzha River. The Second Army (122,748 men), under General Nikola Ivanov, with two infantry divisions and one infantry brigade, was deployed west of the First Army and was assigned to capture the strong fortress of Adrianople (Edirne). Plans had the Third Army (94,884 men), under General Radko Dimitriev, to be deployed east of and behind the First Army and to be covered by the cavalry division that hid it from the Ottomans' sight. The Third Army had three infantry divisions and was assigned to cross Mount Stranja and to take the fortress of Kirk Kilisse (Kırklareli). The 2nd (49,180) and 7th (48,523 men) Divisions were assigned independent roles, operating in Western Thrace and Eastern Macedonia, respectively.

==== Bulgarian Air Force in the Balkan Wars ====
When mobilization was declared on September 17, 1912, the Kingdom of Bulgaria’s Air Force consisted of the Air Force Headquarters (headed by Major Vasil Zlatarov), the Balloon Division (commanded by Lieutenant Yordan Kazandzhiev), and the Airplane Division (commanded by Lieutenant Simeon Petrov). At that time, the Bulgarian army had only two spherical balloons (“Sofia 1” and the spare “Godar”), one Blériot XI aircraft, and several Albatros C.III (model 1911) aircraft. During the war, the number of aircraft in the Bulgarian Army reached 29, and the number of pilots 26. These included 12 Bulgarians and 14 foreign volunteers. Among the foreign pilots were several Russians led by Sergei Sergeyevich Shchetinin (the founder of Russia’s first aircraft factory), who organized a Russian volunteer squadron of five pilots. This squadron consisted of Shchetinin himself, Pyotr Evsyukov, Kolchin, Kostin, and Sedov, flying licensed Farman aircraft. Other foreign volunteers included Ernst Buri from Switzerland, Giovanni Sabelli from Italy, and pilots from France and Great Britain.

During the mobilization at the outbreak of the war, the air force was relocated to Tarnovo Seimen. After the war began, the main base was the newly liberated Mustafa Pasha. Lieutenant Radul Milkov was the commander of the aircraft detachment. It was operationally subordinate to the headquarters of the Second Army, which was besieging the Adrianople Fortress. On November 3, 1912, the Second Air Unit was formed under the command of Lieutenant Dimitar Sakelarov; it was operationally subordinate to the combined First and Third Armies, which were operating on the front near Çatalca. It was successively based at the Chorlu airfield near Çatalca, then temporarily at the railway junction near the village of Kabakcha close to Silivria (from where an attempt was made to bomb Constantinople), and finally at the Çerkezköy airfield. On November 10, 1912, the Third Airplane Detachment was formed, commanded by Lieutenant Penyo Popkrustev; it was first based near the village of Balabandzhik near Malgara, and later at Ursa Airfield not far from Bulair, operationally subordinate to the Fourth Army, which had taken the Bulair Front. Logistically and organizationally, the three airplane detachments were subordinate to the Aviation Park, headed by Major Vasil Zlatarov, as part of the railway company (battalion). Also attached to the Aviation Park were the balloon detachment and the service for aeronautical supply and maintenance of equipment. After the armistice at the end of the war, the 1st and 3rd detachments were based in Drama, and the 2nd in Slivnitsa.

The Bulgarian Air Division was based one kilometer southeast of Mustafa Pasha now Svilengrad to support the Second Army’s siege of Edirne. On October 16, 1912, pilot Radul Milkov and observer Prodan Tarakchiev flew the first reconnaissance mission in an “Albatros” aircraft. Between October 16 and November 17, the detachment’s aircraft made 15 sorties to carry out combat missions primarily reconnaissance of Ottoman positions around Edirne (Karaağaç, Yuruş, Kadınköy, Doganja, Emekçiköy, and the area between the Maritsa and Tundzha rivers). On November 17, 1912, Italian aviator Giovanni Sabelli and observer Major Vasil Zlatarov, flying a “Bleriot XI,” carried out an aerial bombardment of Ottoman positions near Edirne, the first such operation in the history of the Bulgarian Air Force. Contrary to popular belief in Bulgaria, this was not the world’s first aerial bombing; the world’s first aerial bombing was carried out on November 1, 1911, by Italian Lieutenant Giulio Gavotti, who bombed Turkish-Arab forces in Libya.

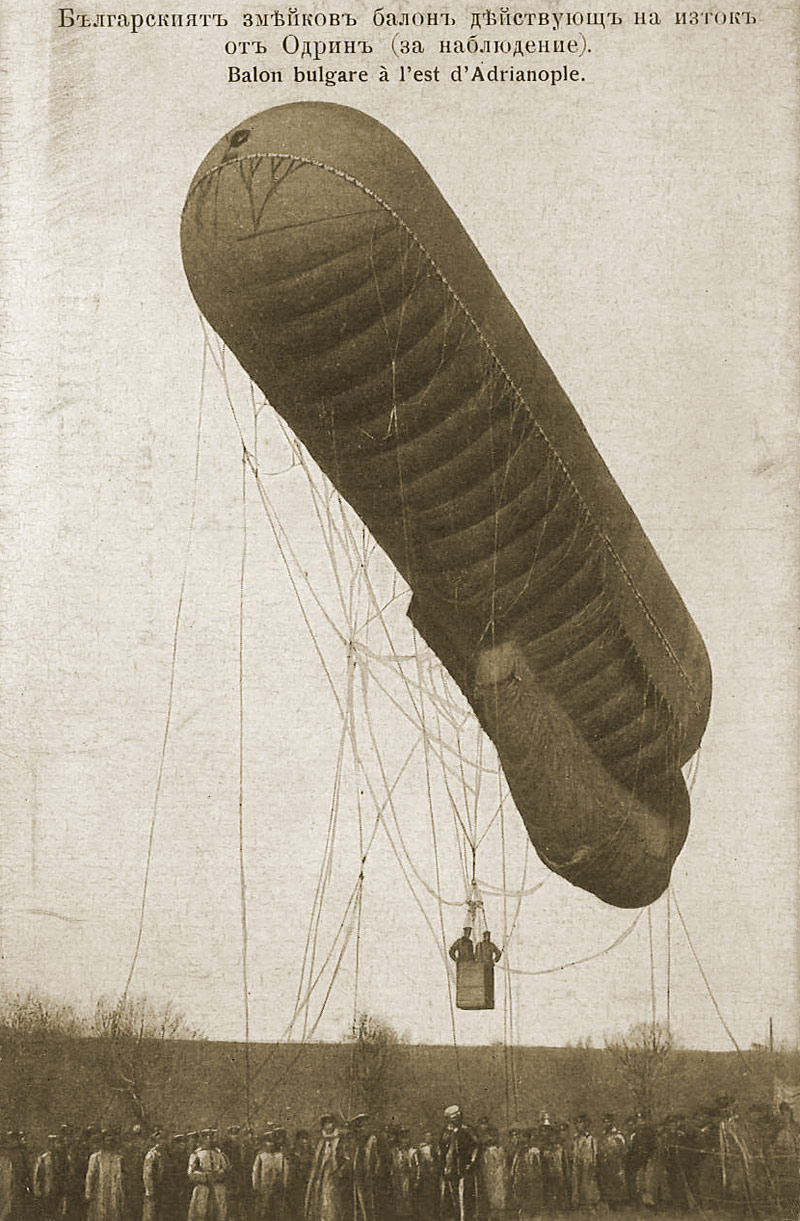
A Bulgarian reconnaissance balloon near Edirne

Initially, the Balloon Unit of the Aeronautical Corps was under the command of the commander of the 2nd Brigade of the 9th Pleven Infantry Division and was primarily engaged in battlefield reconnaissance near Edirne. The “Sofia-1” balloon was first launched on October 15 above a position 2 km east of Dogandja, and it conducted reconnaissance for 10 days of combat until the first armistice. Between October 16 and 18, the balloon was moved to the village of Kemal, after which, due to poor weather conditions, it was not launched again until October 22. On October 23, it was assigned to the Serbian Timok Division, but again, due to poor conditions, it was not launched until October 30, when, in addition to observing the battlefield, it was also used to correct artillery fire.

During the second phase of the war, the Kingdom of Bulgaria’s Air Force consisted of 3 aircraft units and 2 balloon units.

The First Airplane Squadron was attached to the Second Army and carried out missions in the Edirne area, primarily conducting reconnaissance of individual sectors of the fortress, as well as dropping bombs and leaflets. During this period, the squadron flew 19 combat missions. The Second Airplane Detachment was attached to the Third Army (in practice, it was used by the combined armies); it was based in Çerkezköy and was used for reconnaissance of the Çatalca position, between the Marmara Sea and the Black Sea. During this period, the detachment carried out 27 combat flights. The Third Air Squadron was attached to the Fourth Army and carried out missions in the Gallipoli Peninsula area. After hostilities subsided (see Battle of Bulair) on the Gallipoli front, the squadron was used to observe the Bulair position. During this period, it flew 9 combat missions.

The two balloon detachments carried out limited combat operations during this period of the war, with the 1st Detachment being attached to the First Army and the 2nd to the Third.

==== Bulgarian Navy ====
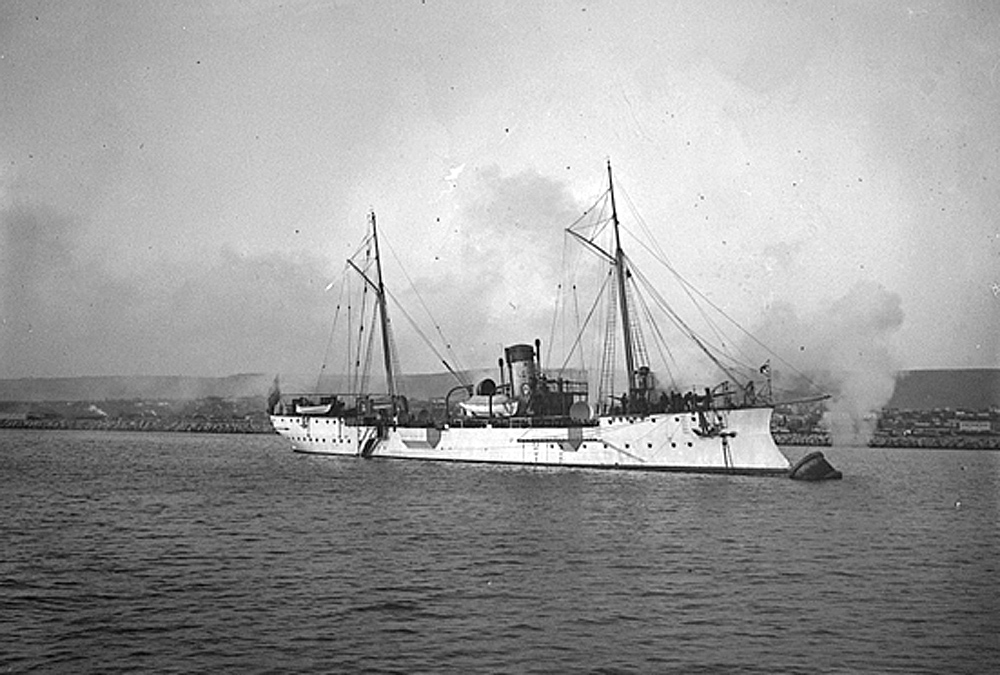
The Bulgarian Navy cruiser Nadezhda

In 1911, the Bulgarian Navy consisted of the Danube Flotilla (headquarters in Ruschuk, 2 old torpedo boats, 4 steam launches, 2 transport ships, 1 yacht, 1 sailing ship, 4 barges, and 14 pontoons) and the Black Sea Flotilla (headquarters in Varna, the cruiser *Nadezhda*, six 97-metric-ton torpedo boats, 1 electric launch, 6 steam launches, 1 steam yacht, 1 sailing yacht, and 3 pontoons for laying mines); coastal defenses consisted of 4 batteries with 8 guns. Immediately prior to the Balkan War of 1912, modernization of the fleet began; a powerful radio station was installed on the cruiser *Nadezhda*, which, during hostilities, jammed radio communications between the besieged Turkish fortress of Adrianople and the high command in Istanbul. After the war began, coastal defenses were reinforced with 13 field artillery batteries from the Vidin and Shumen fortress battalions. In addition, Varna Bay was mined, with a minefield consisting of 214 naval mines laid there.

On October 8, 1912, a Bulgarian coastal defense battery (two 240-mm “Schneider” guns, model 1907, of French manufacture), deployed to defend the port of Varna, opened fire on the Turkish cruiser “Medjidiye” as it approached the port, forcing it to retreat. On November 21, 1912, a detachment of four Bulgarian Navy destroyers achieved its first naval victory the destroyer “Drazki” inflicted serious damage on the Turkish cruiser “Hamidiye”. During the First Balkan War, ships of the Bulgarian Merchant Marine were used to supply Bulgarian troops in Eastern Thrace with food, fodder, fuel, and ammunition. The most significant contribution was made by the steamship “Varna” (Captain V. Filev), which delivered food and fodder to the port of Dedeağaç, thereby contributing to the success of the 4th Bulgarian Army’s operations on the Gallipoli.

=== Ottoman Empire ===
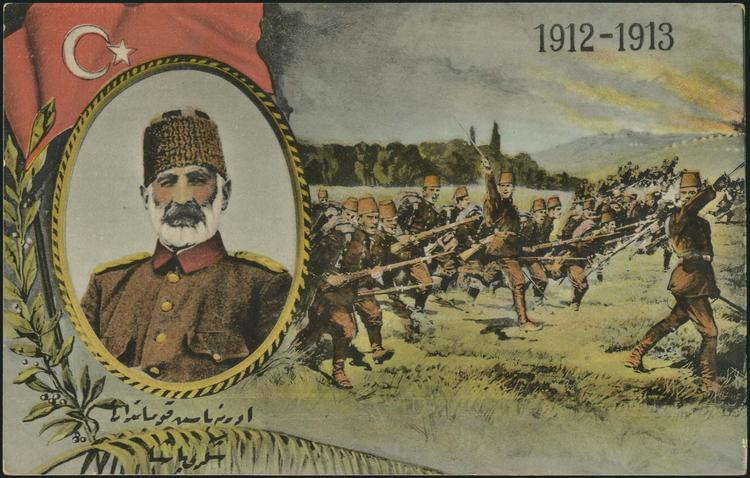
Ottoman postcard celebrating the defender of Adrianople, Mehmed Şükrü Pasha

By the time the Allies were mobilizing, some Ottoman forces had already been mobilized for the war against Italy. On 10 and 12 September, partial mobilization of reservists from Thrace, Macedonia, Kosovo, and Albania was ordered, and on 18 September, general mobilization was announced. On 5 October, as Bulgaria and Greece attacked, a peace treaty was signed with Italy at Lausanne, allowing the Ottoman Empire to concentrate its efforts against its Balkan allies.

The Ottoman command's plans relied on a total fighting strength of 750,000 men. However, due to poor organization and problems with transportation (shortage of railway personnel and pack animals), the mobilization and concentration of troops progressed significantly more slowly than in Bulgaria, Serbia, and Greece. By the start of hostilities, the Ottomans had managed to muster 430,000 soldiers with 930 guns (according to some sources, only 300,000 soldiers). Subsequently, their forces grew to 570,000 soldiers and 4,000 guns.

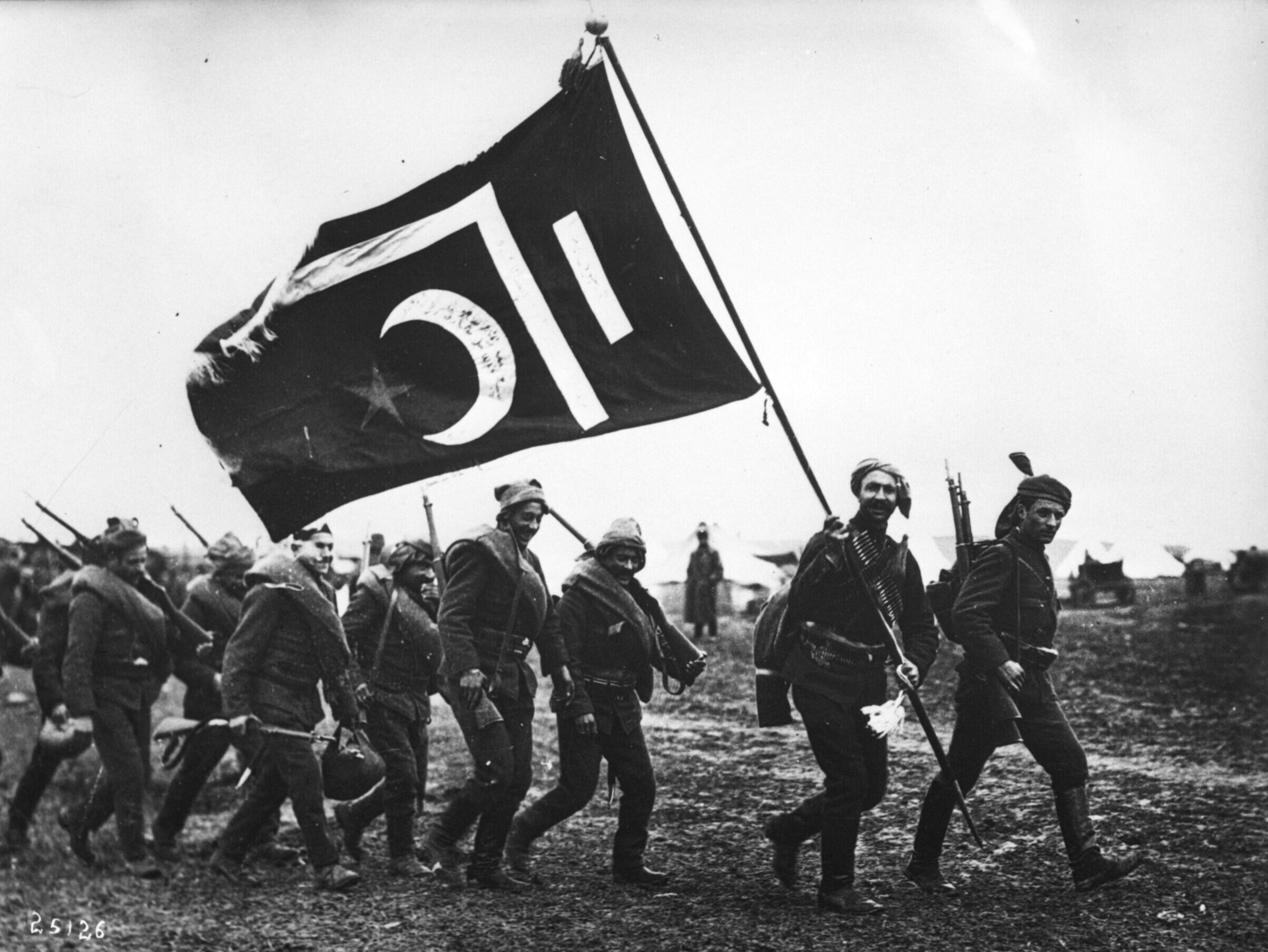
Ottoman troops during the Balkan Wars

The Ottoman war plan against the Balkan allies envisaged: 1) the concentration of the main forces in the north against the Bulgarians and Serbs in Thrace and Macedonia, and 2) containment operations against Greece and Montenegro, for which weaker covering units were allocated.

The Eastern Army, led by Abdullah Pasha, faced the Bulgarians in Thrace. By 4 October, it numbered only 128,000 instead of the planned 342,000. It included the incomplete formations of the I, II, III, IV and XVII Corps, troops from the Edirne fortified area (six divisions and additional units), an independent cavalry division and the Kardzhali detachment. Until the completion of the concentration northwest of Vize, the Eastern Army was to hold the Edirne fortress. The Kardzhali detachment (composed of two divisions and one regiment) occupied positions along the Arda river, blocking the Bulgarian route to the Aegean Sea and thus protecting the land communications between Istanbul and Macedonia. The Bulgarian troops advancing between Tundzha and Strandzha were to be lured into advancing in depth and surrounded by concentric attacks on the flanks. In the event of a favorable turn of events, the Ottoman command planned to advance into the Kingdom of Bulgaria along both banks of the Maritsa River, capture Haskovo and Tarnovo Seimen (Simeonovgrad), and push the Bulgarian armies north towards the Balkan Mountains. However, it underestimated the size of the Bulgarian forces in Thrace and remained unaware of the location and mission of the 3rd Bulgarian Army, which was advancing against Lozengrad.

The Vardar Army, led by Zeki Pasha, was concentrated in Macedonia against the Serbo-Bulgarian offensive. Anticipating the main Serbian attack from Vranje, he gathered his main forces (V, VI and VII Corps – a total of about 58,000 men) for a counterattack from the area between Štip and Kumanovo. The Struma Corps (28,000) was to deliver a supporting blow from the Kresna Gorge against the Allied 2nd Army, thus securing the Ottoman right flank in the battles around Kumanovo and Vranje.

==== Ottoman Air Force in the Balkan Wars ====
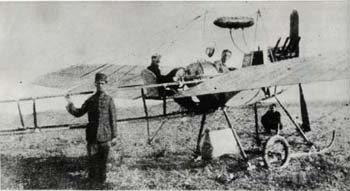
Ottoman pilots during the Balkan Wars (1912–1913)

The Ottoman military aircraft saw their first active combat involvement during the First Balkan War, against the Balkan countries of Montenegro, Serbia, Bulgaria and Greece. Seventeen Ottoman aircraft were used for reconnaissance, from September 1912 to October 1913. The Ottoman military aviation, due to the organization's inexperience in combat, initially lost a number of airplanes. However, as the pilots hardened with battle experience, they improved their combat skills, and many new recruits applied to join the aviation squadrons.

Nevertheless, the Balkan League won the war. A short while later, Bulgaria attacked Greece and Serbia to kick off the Second Balkan War, and the Ottoman Empire declared war on Bulgaria, thus recovering a portion of its lost territories in Eastern Thrace, including the major city of Adrianople.

==== Ottoman Navy ====
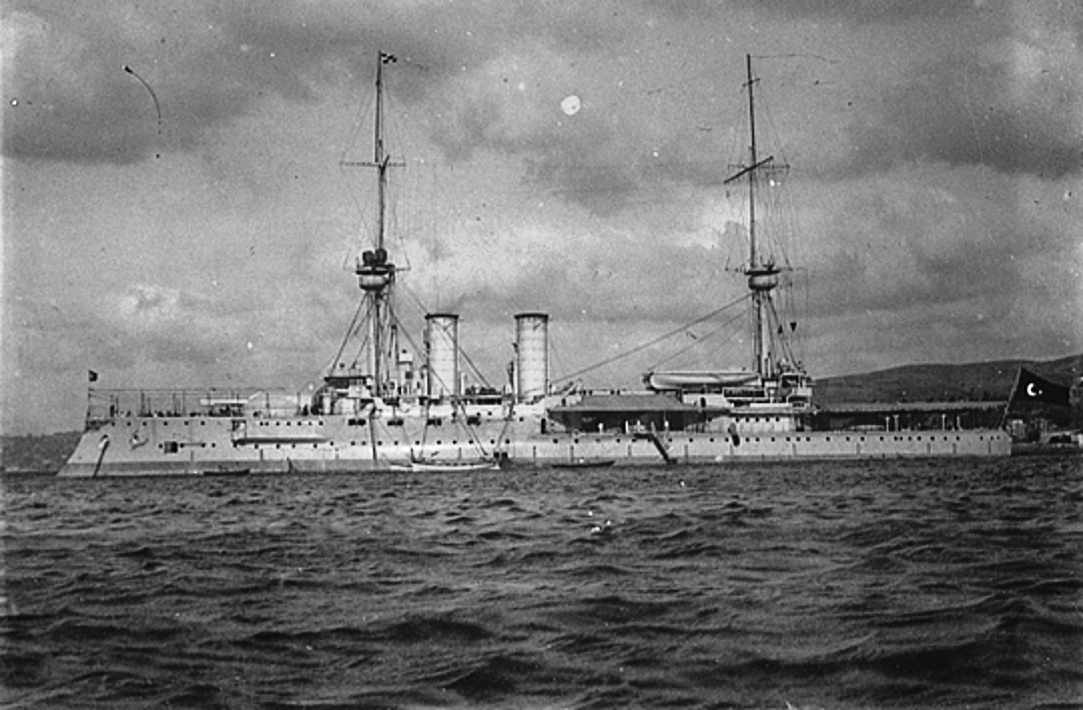
Ottoman flagship Barbaros Hayreddin (photo) and her sister Turgut Reis were more heavily armed and armoured than Georgios Averof, but five knots slower.

The Ottoman fleet had performed abysmally in the 1897 Greco-Turkish War, forcing the Ottoman government to begin a drastic overhaul. Older ships were retired, and newer ones were acquired, chiefly from France and Germany. In addition, in 1908, the Ottomans called in a British naval mission to update their training and doctrine. The British mission, headed by Admiral Sir Douglas Gamble, would find its task almost impossible. The political upheaval in the aftermath of the Young Turk Revolution prevented it to a large extent. Between 1908 and 1911, the office of the Navy Minister changed hands nine times. Interdepartmental infighting and the entrenched interests of the bloated and averaged officer corps, many of whom occupied their positions as quasi-sinecure, further obstructed drastic reform. In addition, the Ottoman ministers met the British attempts to control the navy's construction programme with suspicion. Consequently, funds for Gamble's ambitious plans for new ships were unavailable.

To counter the Greek acquisition of the Georgios Averof, the Ottomans initially tried to buy the new German armoured cruiser SMS Blücher or the battlecruiser SMS Moltke. Not able to afford the ships' high cost, the Ottomans acquired two old Brandenburg-class pre-dreadnought battleships, which became Barbaros Hayreddin and Turgut Reis. Along with the cruisers Hamidiye and Mecidiye, both ships were to form the relatively modern core of the Ottoman battlefleet. By the summer of 1912, however, they were already in poor condition because of chronic neglect: the rangefinders and ammunition hoists had been removed, the telephones were not working, the pumps were corroded, and most of the watertight doors could no longer be closed.

The Ottoman navy performed many duties, including protecting military transport in the Black Sea, conducting operations in the Aegean Sea, and supporting the retreating army. While the navy was based in Istanbul, the ships provided support to the army in the Sea of Marmara at Silivri and Marmaraereğlisi, and in the Black Sea near Çatalca and Midye, while also providinig fire support against enemy units. The Bulgarian Navy, consisting of the 726-ton torpedo gunboat Nadezhda and six torpedo boats, established its main base in Varna and carried out port defense duties and operations against merchant ships. The main objective of the Bulgarian navy was to keep the sea lanes open to Russia. In transport between Constanța and Istanbul, Ottoman ships, to avoid the threat of Bulgarian torpedo boats, either sailed under the protection of Ottoman warships, passed Varna during daylight hours, or took a detour to stay outside the range of the torpedo boats.

== Thracian theatre ==
=== Eastern Thrace ===
==== Battle of Kirk Kilisse (Lozengrad) ====
Map of the Battle of Kirk Kilisse

The Battle of Kirk Kilisse or Battle of Kirklareli or Battle of Lozengrad was part of the First Balkan War between the armies of Bulgaria and the Ottoman Empire. It took place between 22–24 October 1912, when the Bulgarian army defeated an Ottoman army in Eastern Thrace and occupied Kirk Kilisse.

On 21 October, on the orders of Minister of War Nazım Pasha, Abdullah Pasha launched an offensive along a line from Adrianople to Kirk Kilisse in the direction of the Bulgarian frontier before his troops were fully concentrated. The Ottoman offensive was intended as a short push against the Bulgarians advancing across the Tundzha River and aimed to envelop both flanks of the Bulgarian advance.

On 22 October, the Bulgarians and Ottomans met in the fields near Kirk Kilisse. The fighting began in the afternoon, when units of the First Army repelled an Ottoman sortie from Adrianople and managed to put themselves between the fortress and the Ottoman Eastern Army. Meanwhile, the Bulgarian Second Army began to tighten its ring around Adrianople, removing its 50,000 strong garrison from active operations on the battlefield. The First Army continued its advance against the main Ottoman forces, while the Third Army conducted its flanking manoeuvre, aimed at the fortress of Kirk Kilisse.

Postcard depicting Bulgarian troops at the Battle of Lozengrad

During the night of 22 October, General Dimitriev ordered the Third Army to make a night attack, but an order for a concentrated artillery barrage misled the Bulgarians into believing that Kirk Kilisse contained considerable artillery, causing Dimitriev to wait and concentrate his forces before beginning an assault. On 23 October, however, using the cover of darkness, the garrison of Kirk Kilisse abandoned the fortress, leaving only a few artillery crews behind to fire and deceive the Bulgarians.

Meanwhile, the First Army, conducting several artillery barrages combined with bayonet attacks, gained a decisive advantage over the demoralized Ottomans, pushing them back and beginning a counterattack. On 23 October, another Ottoman attack was met and stopped by Bulgarian forces, while a Bulgarian attack personally led by General Dimitriev stabilized the Bulgarian positions. On the morning of 24 October, Dimitriev’s forces entered Kirk Kilisse and found the fortress abandoned by its defenders. Several hours later, the entire Ottoman line collapsed. The Bulgarian units continued their advance, but the General Staff ordered that the enemy be driven back without being pursued, fearing a possible Ottoman ambush. The Ottomans retreated in disorder, abandoning weapons, supplies and artillery along their route. Heavy rains added to their difficulties and demoralization.

==== Battle of Lule Burgas ====
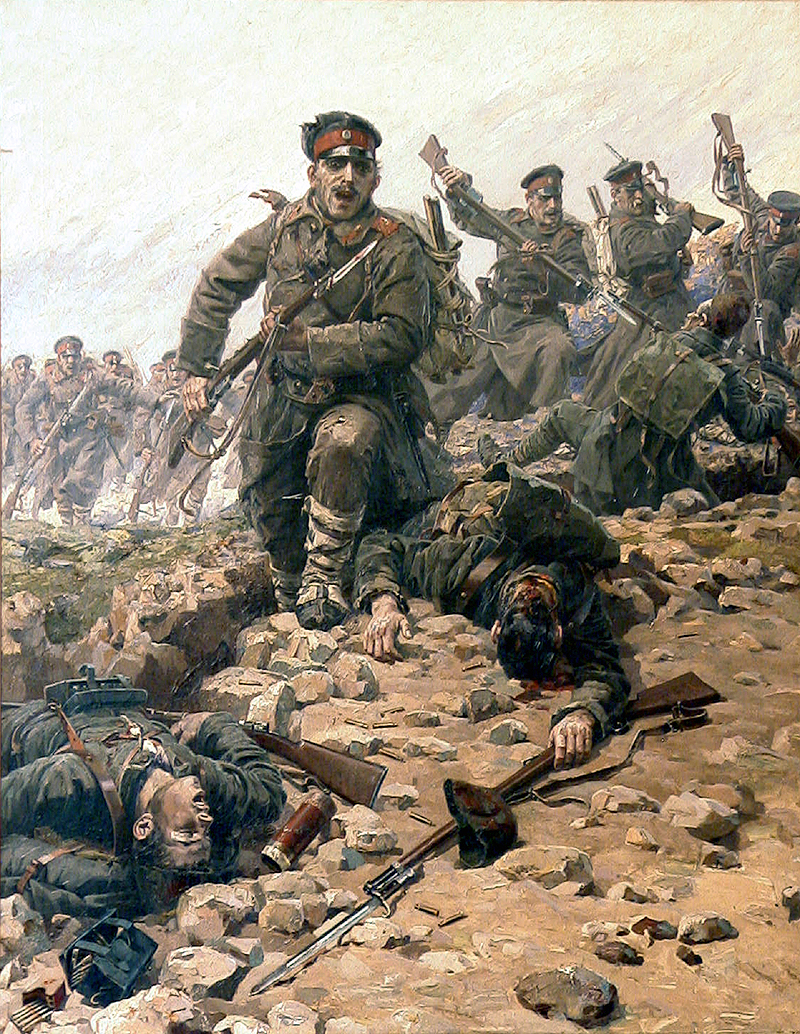
"Bulgarians overrun the Ottoman positions à la bayonette"

The Battle of Lule Burgas (Turkish: Lüleburgaz Muharebesi) or Battle of Luleburgas – Bunarhisar (Bulgarian: Битка при Люлебургас – Бунархисар, Turkish: Lüleburgaz – Pınarhisar Muharebesi) was a battle between the Kingdom of Bulgaria and the Ottoman Empire and was the bloodiest battle of the First Balkan War. The battle took place from 28 October to 2 November 1912. The outnumbered Bulgarian forces made the Ottomans retreat to Çatalca line, 30 km from the Ottoman capital Constantinople. In terms of forces engaged it was the largest battle fought in Europe between the end of the Franco-Prussian War and the beginning of the First World War. After the Bulgarian victory at Lozengrad, the Bulgarians decided to rest their armies for 2–3 days instead of immediately pursuing their enemy. The demoralized Ottoman forces were retreating in disorder, abandoning guns, baggage trains and anything else that might slow them down. Mahmud Muhtar Pasha started to reorganize the Ottoman forces, restoring order and establishing a new defensive position along the 30-kilometre-long Lüleburgaz–Bunarhisar line. The new defensive position stretched from the Ergene River past the villages of Lüleburgaz and Bunarhisar and included shallow trenches along an extended ridge. Reinforcements from Constantinople further strengthened the Ottomans, and officers had somewhat restored discipline. General Dimitriev urged the Bulgarian High Command to order a general advance, but his request was denied by Generals Savov and Fichev. General Fichev did not wish to order the army forward due to poor logistics, bad reconnaissance and uncertainty about the number of Ottoman soldiers. The Bulgarian army resumed its advance on 27 October, with the Third Bulgarian Army advancing rapidly and becoming separated from the First Bulgarian Army.

Map of the Battle of Lule Burgas-Bunarhisar

The newly reinforced Ottoman forces were divided into two armies: the 1st Army, positioned around Lüleburgaz under the command of Abdullah Pasha, and the 2nd Army, positioned around Bunarhisar under the command of Hamdi Pasha, with Abdullah Pasha retaining overall command of the Ottoman forces in Thrace. The Ottomans planned to hold their left flank and centre while sweeping around the Bulgarian left with their right flank. The Bulgarian plan was for the Third Army to pin the Ottoman forces on the Lüleburgaz–Bunarhisar line, while the First Army flanked and defeated the Ottoman left, rolling up the line and driving the Ottomans toward Viza, with the Black Sea behind them, in order to destroy the Ottoman army decisively.

On 28 October, skirmishing between Bulgarian and Ottoman soldiers began around the village of Kolibi Karagach. Fighting throughout the day, 5th Danube Division flanked and successfully drove back the Ottoman forces. On 29 October, the Bulgarian Third Army attacked the Ottomans along the entire front from Lüleburgaz to Bunarhisar. The 4th Preslav Division managed to break through the Ottoman positions with a bayonet attack and capture 36 guns. The Bulgarians encountered Ottoman formations near Viza, meeting heavy resistance and artillery fire. General Dimitriev requested that General Kutinchev come to his aid and envelop the Ottoman left flank, while the Third Bulgarian Army made a frontal advance.

On 30 October, around 50,000 Ottomans advanced against the 5th Danube Division, but after several attacks and counterattacks by both sides, Ottoman numerical superiority and artillery support finally drove back the Bulgarians, forcing them to withdraw and entrench themselves east of Bunarhisar. The Bulgarian Headquarters decided to temporarily combine the 1st and 3rd Armies under the command of General Dimitriev. General Kutinchev became subordinate to the commander of the 3rd Army and was tasked with assisting him as much as possible.

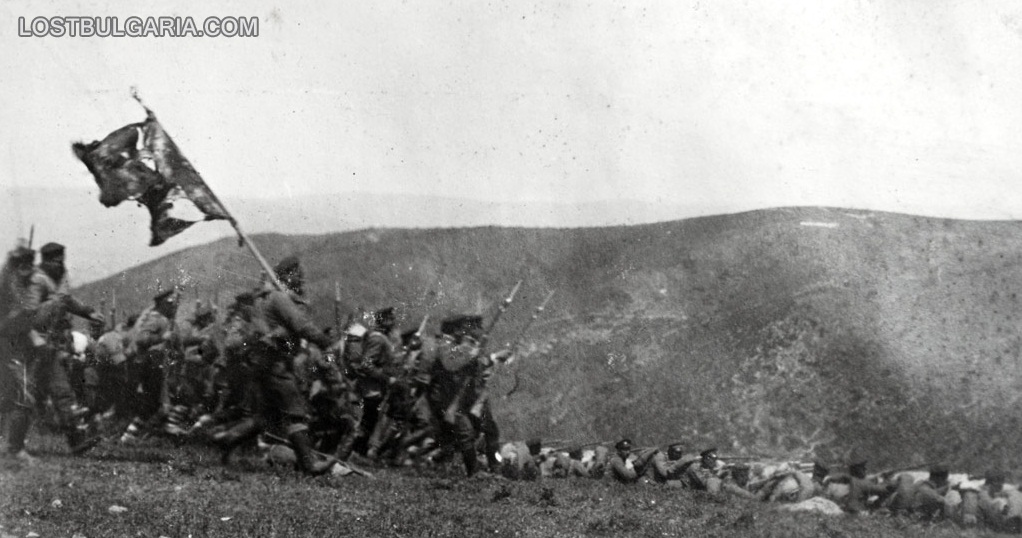
Bulgarian bayonet charge at Lule Burgas

On 31 October, General Dimitriev ordered Kutinchev to attack the Ottoman left flank and push the Ottomans toward Strandzha, while the 3rd Army was to pin them in place and prevent them from reinforcing their left flank. The 1st Bulgarian Army managed to break through the Ottoman positions and began advancing along the entire front, forcing the Ottoman formations into a disorderly retreat. The Bulgarian generals wanted to pursue the retreating Ottomans; however, General Fichev ordered them to halt, put their armies back into order and prepare them for further operations. On 1 November, the 4th Preslav Division attacked the Ottoman forces and subsequently halted an Ottoman attack against the 5th Danube Division. The Preslav Division blocked Mahmud Muhtar Pasha's final attempt to break through the Bulgarian positions.

The Battle of Lüleburgaz–Bunarhisar was the second major defeat for the Ottomans in Thrace. The loss of all of Thrace, with the exception of Adrianople, combined with the heavy casualties, collapsed logistical system, and the disorganized retreat, was a disaster. During their disorganized retreat an outbreak of cholera epidemic made the situation even worse, causing thousands of deaths. Despite beating the Ottoman army twice, the Bulgarians remained in their positions, uncertain of the strategic situation. The victory caught the Bulgarian command unprepared, as Fichev's plans extended only as far as the Ergene River. He assumed that by now the Great Powers should have intervened and stopped the war. The Bulgarian army at last set out and marched as far as Çatalca, the Bulgarian High Command started discussing an eventual attack against the Ottoman positions at Çatalca. The Bulgarian army had become exhausted, suffering from poor supply, stretched lines of communication and an emerging cholera epidemic.

==== First Battle of Çatalca ====
The First Battle of Çatalca, fought between 17 and 18 November [O.S. 4–5 November] 1912 and also known as the Çatalca Operation, was one of the heaviest battles of the First Balkan War. Bulgarian troops under the command of Lieutenant General Radko Dimitriev attempted to break through the defensive lines of the Ottoman Çatalca Army on the approaches to the Ottoman capital Constantinople, but after suffering heavy casualties they were forced to call off the attack. This was the most significant military success of the Ottoman Empire during the First Balkan War and the first major defeat of the Bulgarian Army after the creation of the Third Bulgarian Tsardom.

Map of the First Battle of Çatalca (in Serbian)

On 17 November, at 5 a.m., under the cover of darkness, four Bulgarian divisions began their advance against the fortified positions at Çatalca. It became apparent from the beginning that the Ottoman artillery was operating much more effectively, while the Bulgarian guns were lagging behind and could not match its effect. The 3rd Balkan Division, despite being severely affected by cholera, was tasked with delivering the main blow against the Ottoman right flank. The Balkan Division managed to capture the village of Lazarköy and the surrounding heights, but was forced to dig in there due to heavy Ottoman fire. The Ottoman artillery was better positioned and more effective, while the Bulgarian batteries, being 5–6 km behind the frontline, could not effectively not support the infantry attacks.

At the headquarters of the United 1st and 3rd Armies, a debate began over whether to continue the attack for another day or two or to wait for Adrianople to fall, after which, with the assistance of the Bulgarian siege artillery, another attempt would be made to break through the Ottoman positions. However, after the 3rd Balkan Division captured Fortification No. 2 and the 9th Pleven Division captured the trenches between Fortification No. 7 and the village of Chimachke, hopes of breaking the enemy and achieving success were revived.

General Dimitriev ordered the successes against the Ottoman right flank to be developed further. The Bulgarians then attacked the heights between Lake Derkos and the Black Sea and advanced 4 kilometres. The commander of the United Armies ordered the 1st Army to attack in the direction of Hamidiye–Mahmudiye and to capture some of the strongholds, thereby easing the situation of the 3rd Balkan Division, where fierce fighting was taking place. However a retreat of parts of the 9th Pleven Division, combined with reports that other Bulgarian units had also abandoned previously captured positions, shook General Dimitriev's confidence and made him order the offensive to stop and the troops to dig in. After General Kutinchev learned of the unexpected order to the 3rd army to halt its opeartions he also ordered the 1st to stop and entrench themselves on its current positions

==== Siege of Adrianople ====
The siege of Adrianople (Bulgarian: oбсада на Одрин, Serbian: oпсада Једрена, Turkish: Edirne kuşatması), was fought during the First Balkan War. The siege began on 3 November 1912 and ended on 26 March 1913 with the capture of Edirne (Adrianople) by the Bulgarian 2nd Army and the Serbian 2nd Army.

The loss of Edirne delivered the final decisive blow to the Ottoman army and brought the First Balkan War to an end. A treaty was signed in London on 30 May. The city was reoccupied and retained by the Ottomans during the Second Balkan War.

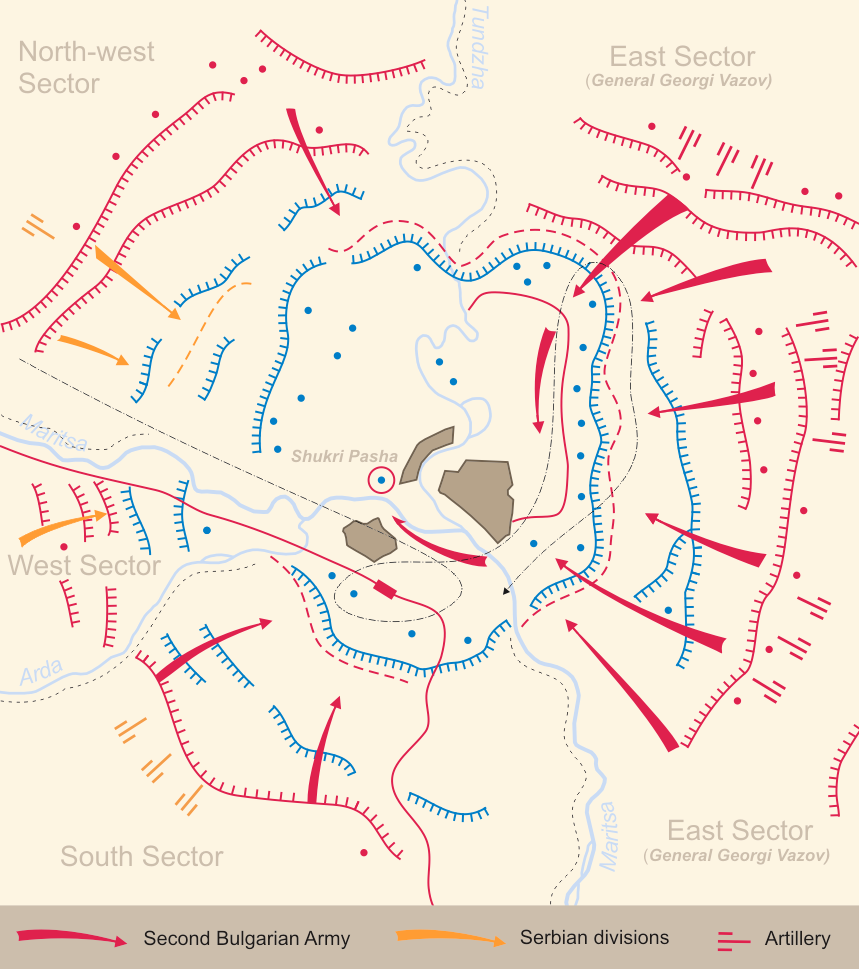
Siege of Adrianople 1912-13

The victorious end of the siege was considered to be an enormous military success because the city's defenses had been carefully developed by leading German siege experts and called 'undefeatable'. The Bulgarian army, after five months of siege and two bold night attacks, took the Ottoman stronghold.

The victors were under the overall command of Bulgarian General Nikola Ivanov while the commander of the Bulgarian forces on the eastern sector of the fortress was General Georgi Vazov, the brother of the famous Bulgarian writer Ivan Vazov and of General Vladimir Vazov.

The early use of an airplane for bombing took place during the siege; the Bulgarians dropped special hand grenades from one or more airplanes in an effort to cause panic among the Ottoman soldiers. Many young Bulgarian officers and professionals who took part in this decisive battle would later play important roles in Bulgarian politics, culture, commerce and industry. The final battle consisted of two night attacks. Preparations for the battle included covering all metal parts of the uniforms and weapons with tissue to avoid any shine or noise. The armies that took part in the siege were put under joint command, creating a prototype of a front. Some light artillery pieces towed by horses followed the advancing units, which played the role of infantry support guns. Attempts were made to perturb all Ottoman radio communications to isolate and demoralize the besieged troops. On 24 March 1913, the external fortifications began to be captured and the next night, the fortress itself fell into Bulgarian hands. Early in the morning on 26 March 1913, the commander of the fortress, Mehmed Şükrü Pasha, surrendered to the Bulgarian Army, which ended the siege.

After the surrender, large parts of the city, especially the houses of Muslims and Jews, were subjected to looting for three days. The perpetrators of the looting, however, are disputed, in that some accounts accuse the Bulgarian army of looting while other sources accuse the local Greek population.

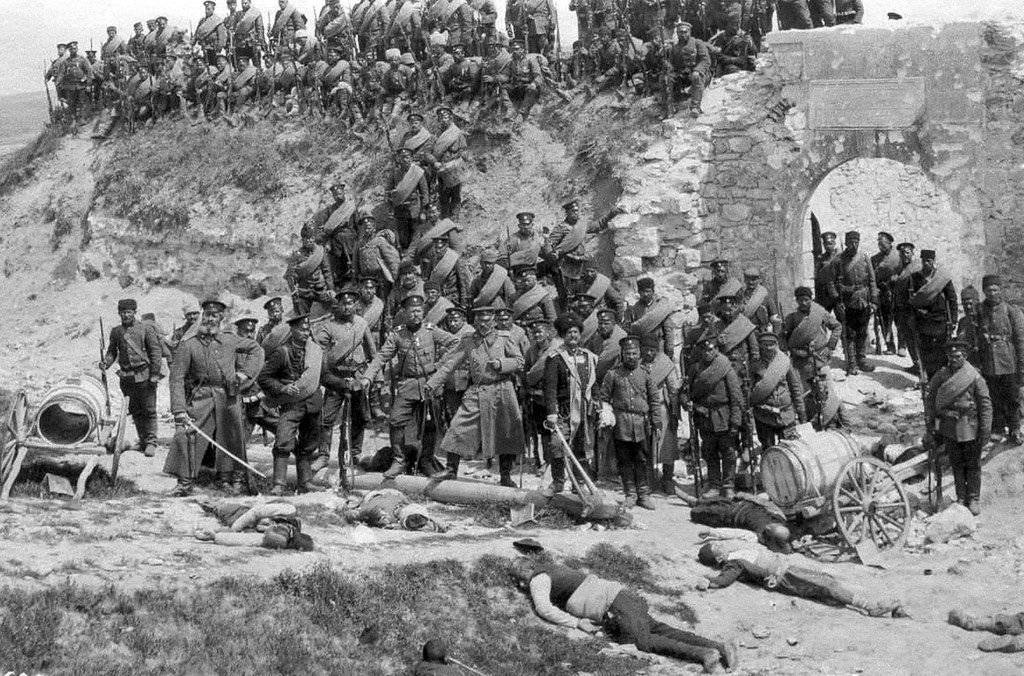
Bulgarian soldiers (and Turkish dead) at the Ayvaz Baba Fort outside Adrianople.

The Bulgarian achievements in the war were summarized by a British war correspondent as follows: "A nation with a population of less than five million and a military budget of less than two million pounds per annum placed in the field within fourteen days of mobilization an army of 400,000 men, and in the course of four weeks moved that army over 160 miles in hostile territory, captured one fortress and invested another, fought and won two great battles against the available armed strength of a nation of twenty million inhabitants, and stopped only at the gates of the hostile capital. With the exception of the Japanese and Gurkhas, the Bulgarians alone of all troops go into battle with the fixed intention of killing at least one enemy." There were many journalists who reported on the siege of Adrianople; their accounts provide rich details about the siege.

Mihail Savov(in the center without a belt and with two hands on his sword) and the Bulgarian General Staff at Adrianople after its capture.

Serbian units involved were the 2nd Army, under the command of General (later Vojvoda, equivalent to Field Marshal) Stepa Stepanović (two divisions and some support units) and heavy artillery (38 siege cannons and howitzers of 120 and 150 mm purchased from French Schneider-Canet factory in 1908); they had been dispatched because the Bulgarians lacked heavy artillery (though they were well supplied with Krupp-designed 75 mm field artillery). Serbian forces, commanded by General Stepa Stepanović, arrived on 6 November 1912. In Mustafa Pasha Place, a railway station outside Odrin, Stepanović immediately reported to the supreme commander, General Nikola Ivanov. The Serbian Second Army was formed from the Timok Division without the 14th Regiment, the Second Danube Division reinforced with the 4th Reserve Regiment, and the Second Drina Artillery Division. There was a total of 47,275 Serbian troops with 72 artillery guns, 4,142 horses and oxen and 3,046 cars.

Both Serbian divisions were immediately sent to the front. The Timok Division, strengthened by a Bulgarian regiment, occupied the north-western sector between Maritsa and Tundzha Rivers, its sector being 15 km long. The Danube Division occupied a 5 km stretch of the western sector between the Maritsa and Arda Rivers. A combined brigade was formed from the Timok Cavalry Regiment and the Bulgarian guard Cavalry Regiment to scout the Maritsa Valley.

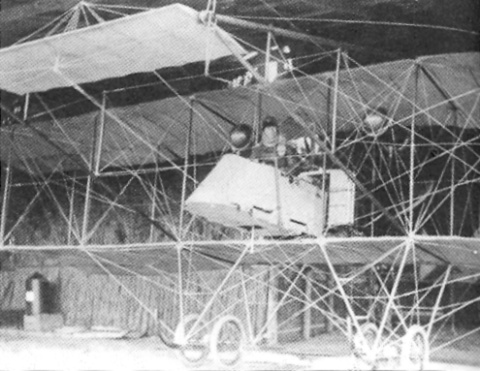
Lieutenant Radul Milkov aboard the Albatros C.III, 1912.

On the morning of October 16, journalists and military attaches gathered at Mustafa Pasha Airport (now Svilengrad) to observe the takeoff of Lieutenants Radul Milkov and Prodan Tarakchiev, who were to conduct reconnaissance of the Edirne Fortress. Before takeoff, pilot Milkov and observer Tarakchiev placed two bombs in baskets attached to the side of the Albatross F-3 aircraft. Their flight lasted 1 hour and 20 minutes at an altitude of about 500 m. When they reached the military site - Karaagach railway station - Prodan Tarakchiev released the bombs. With four holes in the fuselage of the aircraft, the pilots landed safely in Svilengrad. They discovered the Turkish reserves near the village of Kadıköy

Radul Milkov tells about the dramatic flight:

We took two bombs on the plane for testing... These bombs were used en masse by our committees in Macedonia, they were also used here, near Edirne, that's why they were called "Edirne bombs". The weather was magnificent, sunny... I took off at 9:30 – towards Edirne... I flew in a wide circle over the city and we reached Karaagac station, where we dropped the bombs.

On October 19, Lieutenant Hristo Toprakchiev, the first Bulgarian combat aviation victim, died while flying his Bleriot aircraft. On November 12, 1912, Rayna Kasabova flew in an aircraft piloted by Second Lieutenant Kalinov. During the 45-minute flight, she shouted calls in Turkish over Edirne, becoming the first woman in the world to fly under military conditions.

==== Second Battle of Çatalca ====
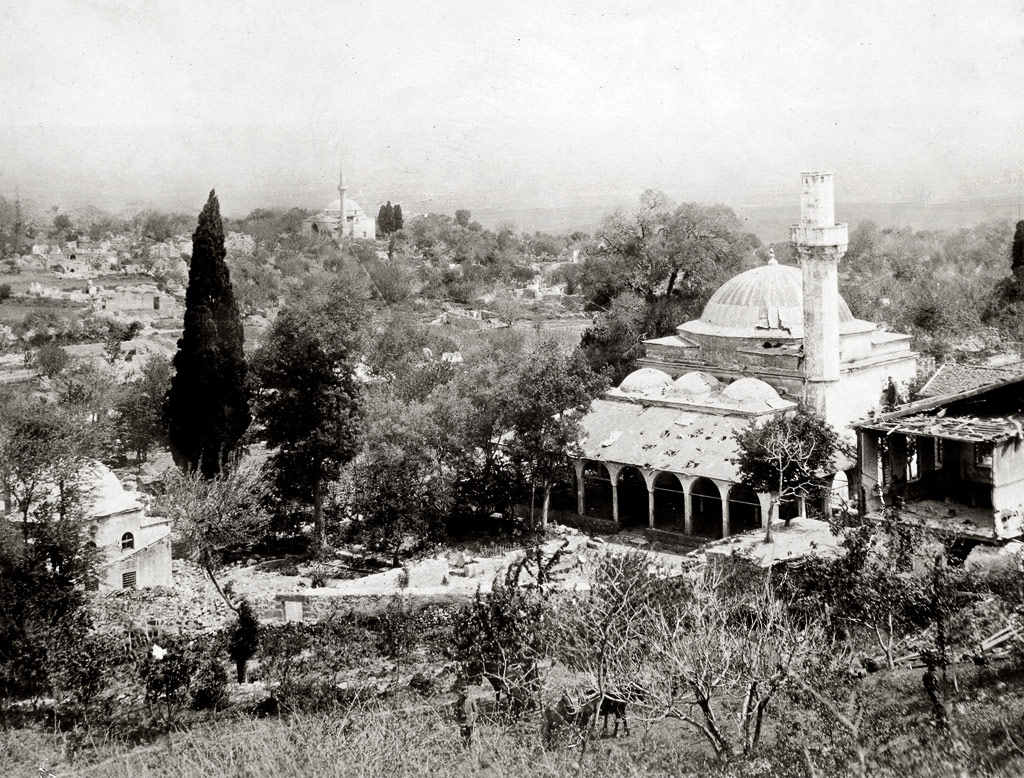
Destroyed mosque after fighting in Çatalca

The Bulgarian advance at the beginning of the First Balkan War stalled at the Ottoman fortifications at Çatalca in November 1912 at the First Battle of Çatalca. A two-month ceasefire (armistice) was agreed to on 3 December [O.S. 20 November] 1912 to allow for peace talks to proceed in London. The talks there stalled when on 23 January [O.S. 10 January] 1913 an Ottoman coup d'état returned Unionists to power, with their non-negotiable stance on retaining Edirne. Hostilities resumed upon expiration of the armistice, on 3 February [O.S. 21 January] 1913, and the Second Battle of Çatalca began.

The battle consisted of a series of thrusts and counter-thrusts by both the Ottomans and the Bulgarians. On 20 February the Ottomans, in coordination with a separate attack from Gallipoli, charged the Bulgarian positions. Although the Bulgarians repulsed the initial attack, they were weakened enough that they withdrew over fifteen kilometers to the south and twenty kilometers to the west to secondary defensive positions; but eventually the lines returned to essentially the originals.

The Bulgarians then moved a section of their army south threatening Çanakkale. The separate siege of Edirne resulted in its loss to the Bulgarians on 26 March, sapping Ottoman morale; and with heavy Bulgarian losses to both fighting and cholera, the battle dwindled down and ceased by 3 April 1913. On 16 April a second ceasefire (armistice) was agreed to, ending the last fighting in the war. The Ottomans held the "Çatalca Line", but failed to advance. The loss of Edirne ended the major Ottoman objection to peace and the Treaty of London on 10 June 1913 codified the Ottoman loss of territory.

=== Gallipoli operations ===
==== Battle of Bulair ====
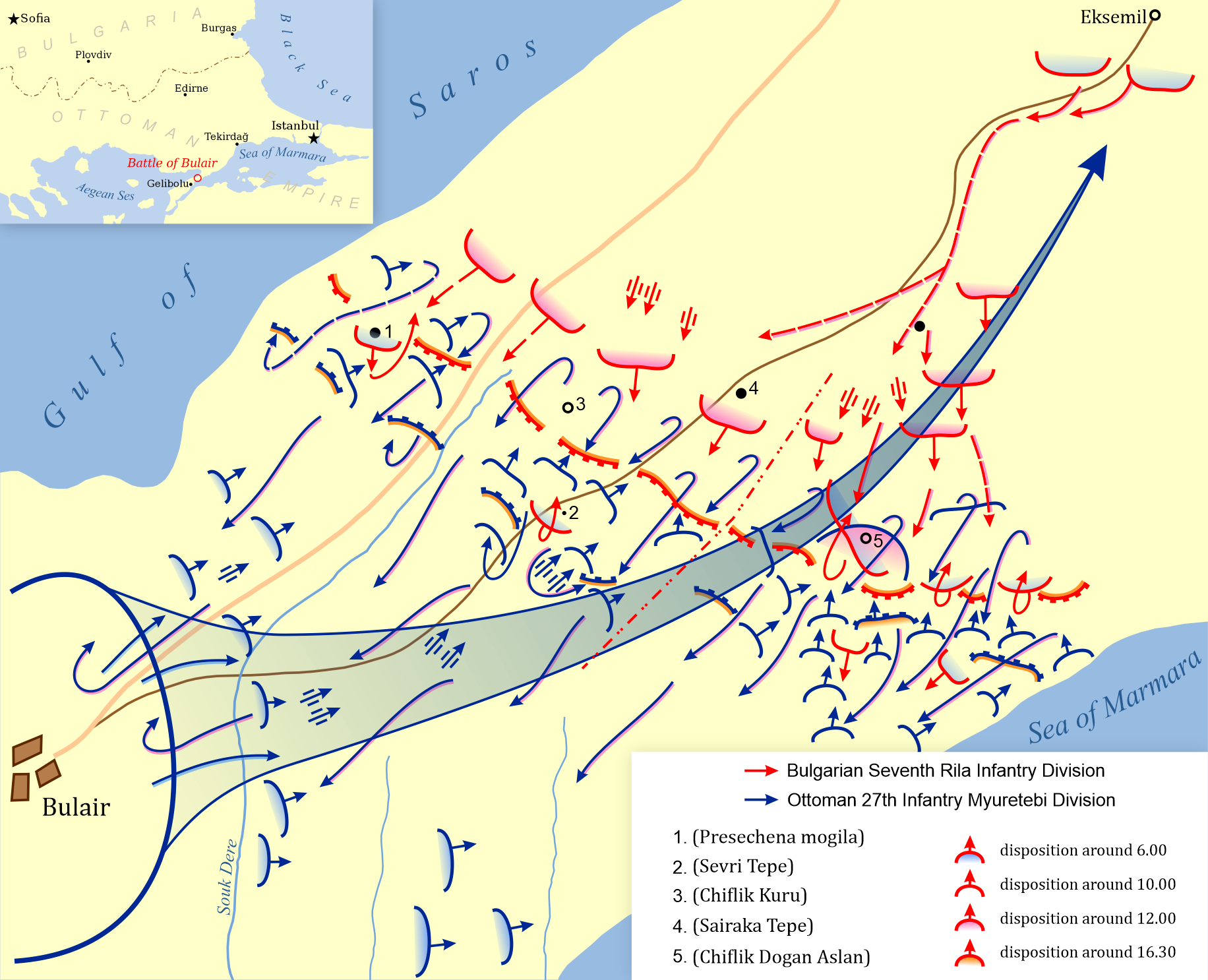
Map of the Battle of Bulair

The battle of Bulair (Bulgarian: Битка при Булаир, Turkish: Bolayır Muharebesi) took place on 8 February 1913 (O.S. 26 January 1913) between the Bulgarian Seventh Rila Infantry Division under General Georgi Todorov and the Ottoman 27th Infantry Division. The result was a Bulgarian victory. The advance began in the morning of 8 February (O.S. 26 January) when the Myuretebi Division headed under the cover of fog from the Saor Bay toward the road to Bulair. The attack was uncovered at only 100 steps from the Bulgarian positions. At 7 o'clock the Ottoman artillery opened fire. The Bulgarian auxiliary artillery also opened fire, as did the soldiers of the 13th Infantry Regiment, and the enemy advance was slowed. From 8 o'clock advanced the Ottoman 27th Infantry Division which concentrated on the shore-line of the Sea of Marmara. Due to their superiority the Ottomans seized the position at the Doganarslan Chiflik and began to surround the left wing of the 22nd Infantry Regiment. The command of the Seventh Rila Infantry Division reacted immediately and ordered a counter-attack of the 13th Rila Infantry Regiment, which forced the Myuretebi Division to pull back.

Bulgarian soldiers at the Battle of Bulair

The Ottoman forces were surprised by the decisive actions of the Bulgarians and when they saw the advancing 22nd Thracian Infantry Regiment they panicked. The Bulgarian artillery now concentrated its fire on Doganarslan Chiflik. Around 15 o'clock 22nd Regiment counter-attacked the right wing of the Ottoman forces and after a short but fierce fight the enemy began to retreat. Many of the fleeing Ottoman troops were killed by the accurate fire of the Bulgarian artillery. After that the whole Bulgarian army attacked and defeated the Ottoman left wing.

Around 17 o'clock the Ottoman forces renewed the attack and headed towards the Bulgarian center but were repulsed and suffered heavy casualties. The position was cleared of Ottoman forces and the defensive line was reorganized. In the battle of Bulair the Ottoman forces lost almost half of their manpower and left all their equipment on the battlefield.

In short, the Ottomans suffered heavy casualties because the landing operation at Şarköy did not take place on time. While the landing of the Ottoman Tenth Corps was expected, the Bulair Corps was attacked by Bulgarian troops from Şarköy and suffered heavy losses.

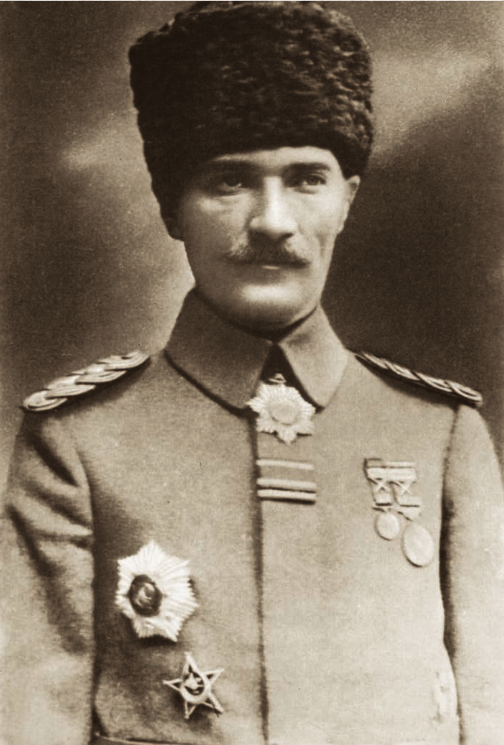
Mustafa Kemal

Enver Pasha

Despite all the losses, Enver Pasha insisted on launching an offensive from Şarköy. However, Fahri Pasha, Ali Fethi, and Mustafa Kemal Pasha opposed this after these events. Enver Pasha came to Bulair and said that the situation was not actually that bad. The Battle of Bulair and the Şarköy landing resulted in the defeat of the Ottoman army. The commanders of the two corps tried to blame each other for the defeat. The events revealed the disagreements among the Young Turk commanders. As a result of the defeat, Ali Fethi and Mustafa Kemal Pasha wanted to resign, but their resignations were not accepted. On March 26, the Bulgarians entered Edirne, and Edirne was officially lost with the Treaty of London on 30 May.

==== Battle of Şarköy ====
The Battle of Şarköy or Sarkoy operation (Bulgarian: Битка при Шаркьой, Turkish: Şarköy Çıkarması) took place between 9 and 11 February 1913 during the First Balkan War between Bulgaria and the Ottoman Empire. The Ottomans attempted a counter-attack, but were defeated by the Bulgarians at the Battles of Bulair and Şarköy.

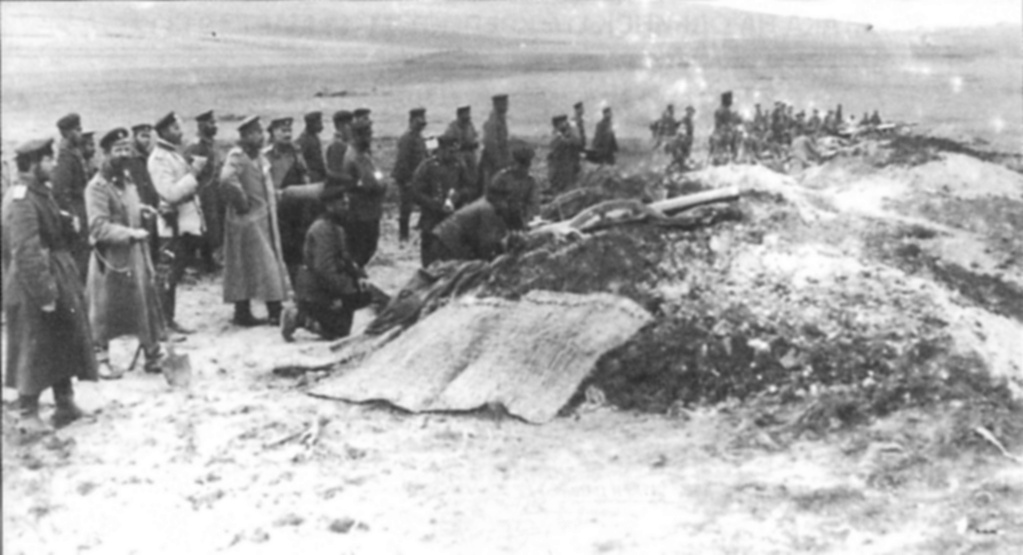
Bulgarian artillery in position

On January 23, 1913, a coup d'état led by the Young Turk leader Enver Pasha took place in the Ottoman Empire. Five days later (February 3), the new government resumed hostilities against the countries of the Balkan Union. Ottoman troops launched an offensive from Gallipoli against Bulgarian positions in Bulair, with the goal of subsequently attempting to reach besieged Adrianople. A naval landing at Sharköy, in the rear of the Bulgarian 7th Rila Infantry Division, was expected to facilitate the success of this operation.

On February 7, the Ottoman 10th Corps (15,000 troops) embarked on 32 transport ships at Yeşilköy, near Istanbul, and several other ports. The Turks approached the landing site under the cover of a squadron of three armored cruisers and several smaller vessels. The landing was planned to begin at 7:00 a.m. on February 8, simultaneously with the advance on Bulair. However, the landing of troops did not begin until 1:00 PM, 3 km west of Sarkoy, on a stretch of coast unguarded by Bulgarian troops. Ottoman units advanced east and north and encountered two companies of the Macedonian-Odrin militia near the town. Despite the Turks' numerical superiority, the militia managed to hold Sarkoy until evening, after which they retreated in an orderly fashion. By this time, it had become clear that the Ottoman offensive from Gallipoli had been thwarted in the Battle of Bulair. Holding Sarkoy, which had been captured, was pointless, but Enver Pasha insisted on continuing the landing despite the bad weather.

New Ottoman troops landed on February 9. The Bulgarian command transferred the main units of the Macedonian-Adrianople Militia (commanded by Major General Nikola Genev), the 2nd Brigade of the 2nd Thracian Infantry Division, and the 50th Infantry Regiment to the combat zone. On February 10, Bulgarian forces launched a counteroffensive and pinned the Turks to the coast of the Sea of Marmara. Under heavy Bulgarian artillery fire, the 10th Corps was re-embarked and transferred to Gallipoli. As a result of this failure, it became impossible to aid Adrianople from Gallipoli. The Turkish offensive towards the besieged city from March 16–19, 1913, during the Second Battle of Çatalca, was also unsuccessful, and the city capitulated on March 26, 1913.

=== Western Thrace and the Rhodopes ===
==== Battle of Kardzhali ====
The Battle of Kircaali or Battle of Kardzhali was part of the First Balkan War between the armies of Bulgaria and the Ottoman Empire. It took place on 21 October 1912, when the Bulgarian Haskovo Detachment defeated the Ottoman Kırcaali Detachment of Yaver Pasha and permanently joined Kardzhali and the Eastern Rhodopes to Bulgaria. The anniversary of that event is celebrated annually on 21 October as a holiday of the city. Shortly before the war between Bulgaria and the Ottoman Empire, the 2nd Brigade of the 2nd Thracian Infantry Division (28th and 40th Infantry Regiments, reinforced by the 3rd Artillery Regiments was deployed in the area around Haskovo and had orders to cover the routes to Plovdiv and Stara Zagora. After the correction of the Bulgarian-Ottoman border in 1886 following the Unification of Bulgaria, the Ottomans controlled Kardzhali and the surrounding mountain ridges. Their army in the region was dangerously close to the railway between Plovdiv and Harmanli and the base of the Bulgarian armies which were to advance into Eastern Thrace. The commander of the 2nd Army General Nikola Ivanov ordered Delov to push the Ottomans to the south of the Arda river.

The Bulgarian Haskovo Detachment numbered 8,700 soldiers with 42 guns. and opposed the Ottoman Kırcaali Reserve Division (Kırcaali Redif Fırkası) and in the west the left group of the Bulgarian Rodopo Detachment opposed the Ottoman Kırcaali Home Guard Division (Kırcaali Müstahfız Fırkası) that were the parts of the Ottoman Kırcaali Detachment under Yaver Pasha, which was much larger (24,000) but was dispersed and with fewer artillery pieces. On the first day of the war, 18 October 1912, Delov's detachment advanced south across the border in four columns. The next day, they defeated the Ottoman troops at the villages of Kovancılar (present day: Pchelarovo) and Göklemezler (present day: Stremtsi) and then headed for Kardzhali. The detachment of Yaver Pasha left the town in disorder. With its advance towards Gumuljina, the Haskovo detachment threatened communications between the Ottoman armies in Thrace and Macedonia. For this reason, the Ottomans ordered Yaver Pasha to counter-attack before the Bulgarians could reach Kardzhali but did not send him reinforcements. To follow this order he had in command 9 tabors and 8 guns.

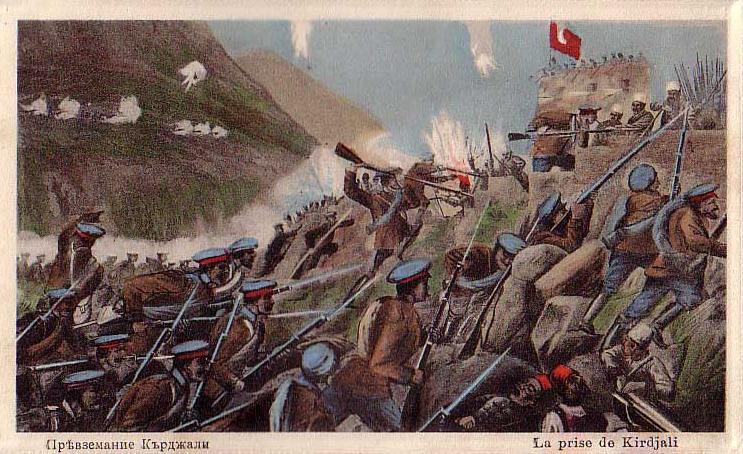
The Bulgarians capture Kardzhali from the Ottomans

However, the Bulgarians were not aware of the strength of the enemy and on 19 October the Bulgarian High Command (the Headquarters of the Active Army under General Ivan Fichev) ordered General Ivanov to stop the advance of the Haskovo Detachment because it was considered risky. The commander of the 2nd Army, however, did not withdraw his orders and gave Delov freedom of action. The detachment continued with the advance on 20 October. The march was slowed by the torrential rains and the slow movement of the artillery but the Bulgarians reached the heights to the north of Kardzhali before the Ottomans could reorganize.

In the early morning of 21 October Yaver Pasha engaged the Bulgarians in the outskirts of the town. Due to their superior artillery and attacks on bayonet the soldiers of the Haskovo Detachment overran the Ottoman defenses and prevented their attempts to outflank them from the west. The Ottomans were in turn vulnerable to outflanking from the same direction and had to retreat for a second time to the south of the Arda River, leaving behind large quantities of munitions and equipment. At 16:00 the Bulgarians entered Kardzhali. As a result of the battle most of the population left the town. The Turkish inhabitants of the area fled during the Bulgarian advance.

The defeated Ottomans retreated to Mestanlı (present day: Momchilgrad), while the Haskovo Detachment prepared defenses along the Arda. Thus the flank and the rear of the Bulgarian armies advancing towards Adrianople and Constantinople were secured. Concerned that after the fall of Kardzhali the Bulgarians would cut off the railway between Salonika and Dedeagach, the Ottoman High Command decided to distract the Bulgarians. Its haste orders for counter-attack of the Eastern Army led to the crushing defeat of the Ottomans in the Battle of Kirk Kilisse. The Bulgarian command did not proceed with the advance after the fall of Kardzhali. Instead of taking Gumuljina, on 23 October the main forces of the Haskovo Datachment were ordered to go east and participate in the siege of Adrianople. Only a small squad was left in Kardzhali.

==== Battle of Alamidere ====
The Battle of Alamidere was an engagement between Bulgarian and Ottoman troops during the First Balkan War near the village of Alamidere, 15 km southeast of present-day Smolyan, on 21 October (3 November, New Style) 1912.

Following their victory, the 21st Srednogorets Regiment captured the upper reaches of the Arda River and created favorable conditions for the complete liberation of the Rhodope Mountains from Ottoman rule. In honor of these events, in 1934 the village was renamed Colonel Serafimovo (after the rank and name of the regiment's commander), and the height around which the battle was fought was named Srednogorets Peak.

Memorial Tomb and Victory Monument Erected by the Bulgarians in Commemoration of the Battle

Early in the morning of October 21, the Bulgarians set off in three columns towards Golyam Palas in search of contact with the enemy. At around 10 a.m., the front units of the two armies clashed near the road to Fatovo. The Bulgarian vanguard retreated in disorder, but the Turks did not pursue it. With the arrival of the remaining units of the 21st Regiment, Serafimov ordered an attack against the Turks (6 battalions and 1 battery), who had occupied a wooded hill. The attack was unsuccessful until the right column (about 1,000 men with 6 guns, led by Lieutenant Colonel Iliya Vrachev) passed through the village of Alamidere and occupied the heights to the left and in the enemy's rear unhindered. The Turkish reserves counterattacked several times, but were repulsed. At this time, the other Turkish flank was also broken as a result of a bayonet attack by the Bulgarians. This led to a general retreat of the Turks after 8 hours of fighting. The Ottoman commander's plan to outflank the Bulgarian troops failed because the battalion assigned to the manoeuvre arrived late.

After their defeat, the Turks retreated to the southern shore of Arda and, with few exceptions, no longer threatened the region. The day after the battle, on October 22, Serafimov's troops captured Golyam Palas and Smilyan almost without resistance. The fighting subsided for about 2 weeks. In early November, the Bulgarian troops went on the offensive, finally pushing the Ottomans out of the Rhodope Mountains and by the middle of the month they had conquered the territories to the shores of the Aegean Sea.

In the Battle of Alamidere, 35 Bulgarians were killed, 75 were wounded, and 22 were missing. There is no exact information about Turkish losses, but the number of dead alone was over 180.

==== Battle of Balkan Toresi ====
The Battle of Balkan Toresi (or Makaza), which took place on November 7 (November 20, new style) 1912, was a battle of the First Balkan War, as a result of which the Bulgarians finally pushed the Ottoman troops out of the Eastern Rhodopes. The 3rd Brigade of the Macedonian-Adrianopolitan Volunteer Corps made a major contribution to the victory.

In early November 1912, after their victories at Lozengrad and Bunarhisar, the main forces of the Bulgarian army reached the approaches to Constantinople. The Edirne fortress, and with it the most direct railway line from Bulgaria, remained under Ottoman control. This made it difficult to supply the Bulgarian troops with food and ammunition. Therefore, the Main Command of the Active Army (M. Savov, Iv. Fichev) ordered the Kardzhali Detachment (comprising two regiments and one brigade of the MOO, led by General Nikola Genev) to advance from Kardzhali and capture Dedeagach. A railway line to Dimotika and Çorlu to the Bulgarian positions in front of Chataldzha passed through the White Sea port.

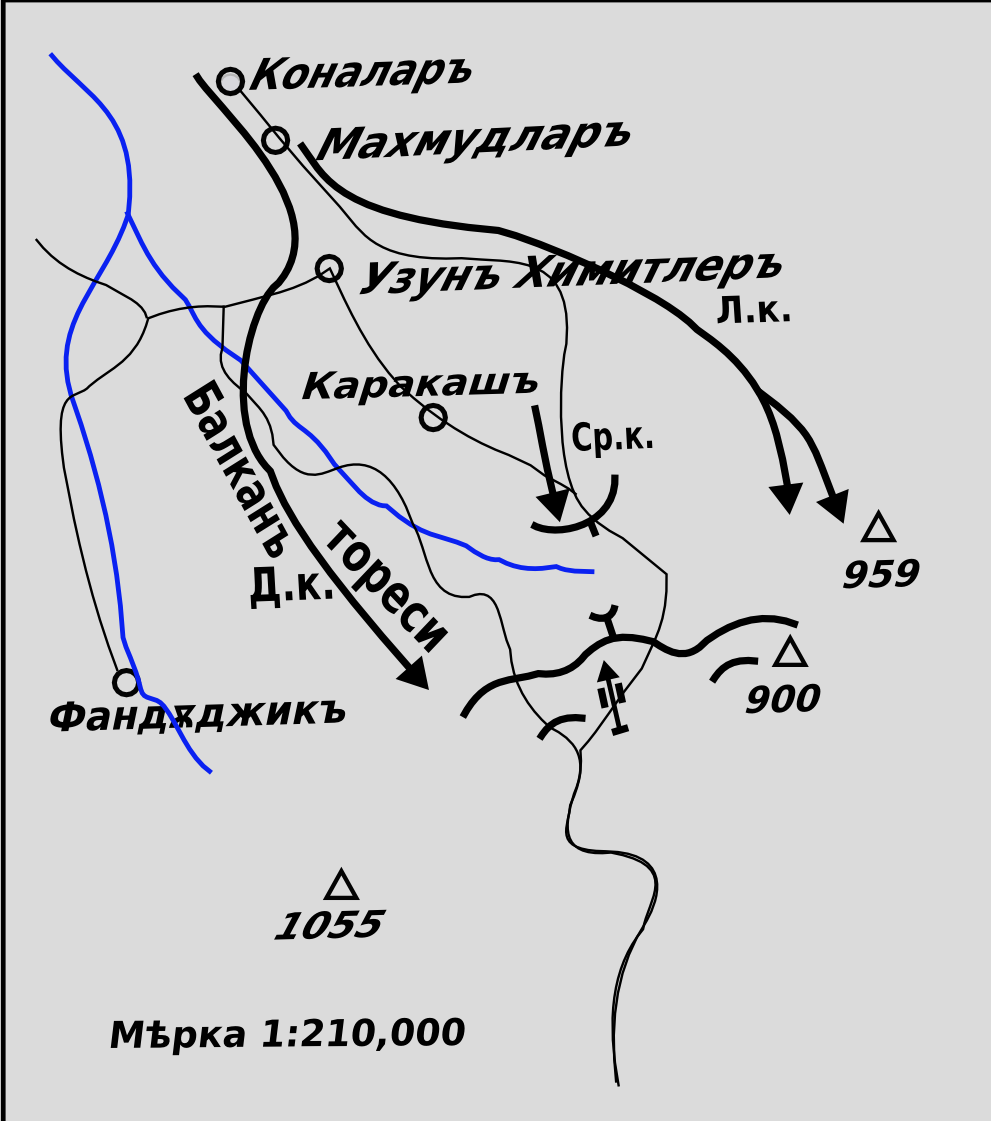
Map of the Battle of Balkan Toresi

In fulfillment of the order, on November 2, Genev went on the offensive and two days later captured Mustanli (today's Momchilgrad). At the same time, the Rhodope Detachment advanced from the west towards Xanthi (captured on November 7), and the Combined Horse Brigade occupied the Soflu area. Threatened from three sides, Yaver Pasha retreated from Mustanli through Komotini to Dedeagach. At the Balkan Toresi pass, the Turkish commander left a covering detachment of three battalions with 5 rapid-fire guns. Their task was to delay the Bulgarian advance as much as possible and gain time for the unhindered withdrawal of the main forces.

The battle for the pass began at dawn on 7 November. Genev's plan was to launch flanking attacks against the Turkish positions from the northwest with the 1st Combined Regiment (right column, consisting of three companies) and from the northeast with two companies of the 2nd Combined Regiment (left column), followed by a frontal attack with the 3rd Brigade of the MOO (four companies). However, the attack was poorly coordinated the flank columns were late and the Macedonian-Adrianople militia were exposed to counterattacks by the Turks. Part of the brigade retreated, but the Turkish advance was stopped by the reserves, which were bypassing the pass on the right. With the arrival of the right column and additional Bulgarian reserves, the balance shifted in favor of the Bulgarians. The Bulgarians attacked the Turkish positions from two sides and captured them by 9 p.m. The left column of the Kardzhali detachment did not manage to arrive in time to join the battle.

The very next day, November 8, the Bulgarians overcame the resistance of the Turkish rearguard and entered Gyumyrzhina, which had been abandoned by the Turkish troops. The fighting at Balkan Torresi allowed Yaver Pasha to gain a one-day head start over Genev's detachment. However, the pursuit continued and a week later (November 14–15) most of the Turkish corps was captured near Merhamli, near the mouth of the Maritsa. In the battle, the 3rd Brigade of the Macedonia-Adrianopolitan Volunteer Corps sustained a total of 40 deaths and 124 injuries.

==== Battle of Merhamli ====
The Battle of Merhamli was part of the First Balkan War between the armies of Bulgaria and the Ottoman Empire which took place on 14/27 November 1912. After a long chase throughout Western Thrace the Bulgarian troops led by General Nikola Genev and Colonel Aleksandar Tanev surrounded the 10,000-strong Kırcaali Detachment under the command of Mehmed Yaver Pasha. Attacked in the surrounding of the village Merhamli (Now Peplos in modern Greece), only a few of the Ottomans managed to cross the Maritsa River. The rest surrendered in the following day on 28 November. In the beginning of 1912 when the Ottoman-Montenegrin conflict from the previous month grew into Balkan-wide war the main forces of the adversaries were concentrated in Eastern Thrace and Macedonia. In the battle of Lule Burgas (28 October-2 November) the Ottoman Eastern Army was crushed by the Bulgarians and pushed to Constantinople and Gallipoli. On 9 November the Greeks captured Salonica.

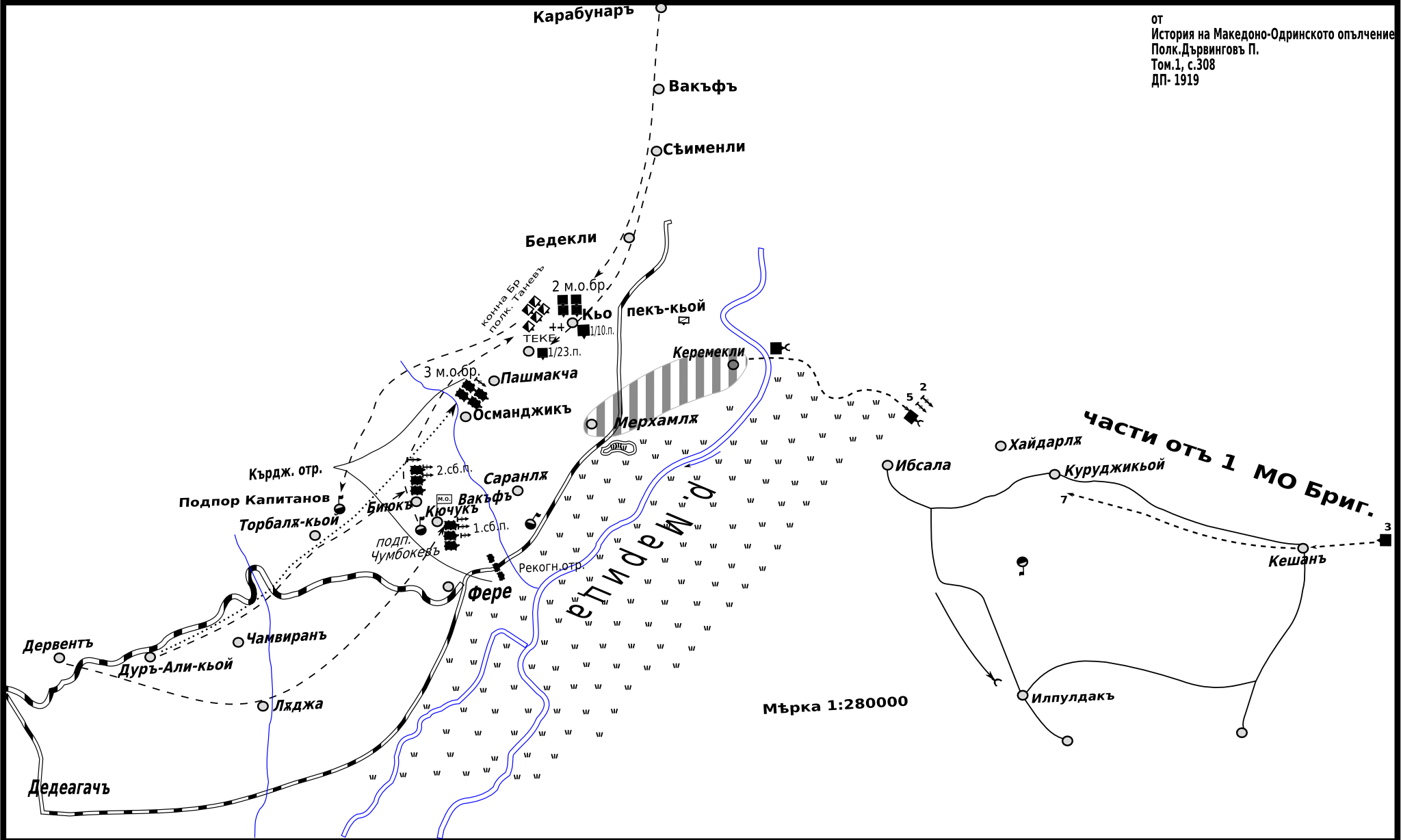
The Battle of Merhamli

The actions in the Rhodope Mountains during the first month of the war were limited. After the Bulgarians captured Kardzhali (21 October) and Smolyan (26 October) the Bulgarian troops took defensive positions. The Ottoman attempts for counter-attacks against Kardzhali and Smolyan Battle of Alamidere failed and the front line stabilized along the Arda River.

The main task of the Ottoman Kardzhali corps which was stationed in the Eastern Rhodopes was to prevent the Bulgarians from cutting the land communications between the Ottoman armies in Thrace and Macedonia. However, after the successes of the Balkan allies to the east and to the west, that task became pointless and after the Bulgarian High Command issued advance towards the important port of Dedeagach the situation of the corps became critical. Its commander Mehmed Yaver Pasha ordered a retreat to Galipoli with fighting in the rearguard. After the fall of Salonica to the Balkan allies the Rodopi Detachment changed the direction of its advance. From Serres and Drama the detachment of General Stiliyan Kovachev headed eastwards and on 20 November captured Xanthi. Six days later his troops entered Dedeagach which was already taken by Macedonian volunteers. In the Battle of Balkan Toresi on 20 November the Kardzhali Detachment (3rd Brigade of the Macedonian-Adrianopolitan Volunteer Corps, two mixed regiment and other squads) defeated the Ottoman rearguard and entered Gyumyurdzhina in the next day. After several day march through the Eastern Rhodopes General Genev gave his troops a rest. On 25 November the detachment continued eastwards and after two days captured Feres in close proximity to the camp of Mehmed Yaver Pasha on the right banks of the Maritsa. On 15 November the Mixed Cavalry Brigade of Colonel Tanev captured Soflu. Reinforced with the 2nd Brigade of the Macedonian-Adrianopolitan Volunteer Corps he marched south along the Maritsa and on 18 November took Feres and on 19 November captured Dedeagach. However, concerned about the news for advancing Ottoman reinforcement, Tanev retreated back to Soflu leaving 150 volunteers in Dedeagach.

On 26 November the corps of Mehmed Yaver Pasha reached Merhamli and began to cross the Maritsa but due to the torrential rains only 1,500-2,000 men with two guns managed to reach the left bank until noon in the next day. In the meantime the troops of Tanev attacked the Ottoman forces from the north and the detachment of Genev was closing in from the west. In the evening of 27 November Tanev forced the Ottoman commander to sign a document for capitulation. The Ottomans surrendered in the next day after the Kardzhali Detachment arrived at Merhamli. Around 9,600 Ottoman soldiers and officers were captured along with 8 artillery guns.

The survived Ottoman forces which managed to cross the Maritsa joined the Ottoman defenders in Galipoli. With the capitulation at Merhamli the Ottoman Empire lost Western Thrace while the Bulgarian positions in the lower current of the Maritsa and around Istanbul stabilized. With their success the Mixed Cavalry Brigade and the Kardzhali Detachment secured the rear of the 2nd Army which was besieging Adrianople and eased the supplies for 1st and 3rd Armies at Chatalja.

== Macedonian theatre ==
While the Thracian front was decisive for the Bulgarian war effort, the Macedonian theatre was designated secondary, although from an ethnic point of view it was of primary importance to the Bulgarians during the war. The 7th Rila Division advanced along the Struma valley, being some 200 km away from Thessaloniki, while the Bulgarian High Command received information of the Ottoman 6th Corps moving out of Serres, while the Ottoman 5th Corps was positioned around Strumitsa.

General Georgi Todorov

The first significant disagreement between the Balkan League commands came when Serbian General Stepa Stepanović, commander of the Second Allied Army, did not approve the 7th Rila Division's request for independent operations along the Struma valley. Regardless of this disapproval, however, the 7th Rila Division, under direct orders from the Bulgarian High Command, disobeyed General Stepanović and marched off. Between 24 and 27 October, Bulgarian forces entered Kočani, the Kresna Gorge and Štip, but on 31 October received false reports of Ottoman movements around Kočani, which wasted three days for the Bulgarians, who wanted to take Thessaloniki before the Greeks.

After the Greek victory at the Battle of Giannitsa on 2 November and the capture of Demir Hisar on 6 November, General Savov urged General Todorov to push towards Thessaloniki with the 7th Rila Division, supported by the Rhodope Detachment, as fast as possible. On 7 November, General Todorov asked General Stiliyan Kovachev to send the Rhodope Detachment westwards in order for the Bulgarians to secure Thessaloniki. The Bulgarian forces in Southern Macedonia, now numbering some 70,000 men, were becoming increasingly tired from constant marches, fierce fighting around Drama and poor weather conditions. The Bulgarians also managed to cut the communication line between Constantinople and the Ottoman Southern Corps group. The Ottoman situation was made even worse by the activity of four IMRO detachments threatening its rear.

Bulgarian and Greek cavalry forces met near the village of Postol. General Todorov, upon learning of the negotiations between the Greeks and the Ottomans for the surrender of the city, ordered his men to continue their march toward Thessaloniki without stopping. At the village of Güvezna, where the headquarters of the 7th Rila Division was situated, the commander of the Greek cavalry brigade arrived and asked General Todorov what he intended to do, to which Todorov replied that he would attack and enter Thessaloniki. This decision was immediately transmitted to Greek General Headquarters. The news of the Bulgarian advance compelled Tahsin Pasha to continue the negotiations with Prince Constantine. The capitulation protocol was signed on 9 November, and Thessaloniki was handed over to the Greek army. Prince Constantine wrote a second letter to General Todorov informing him of the surrender of the Ottoman garrison and asking him to stop all further movement. However, this message was received only on 10 November.

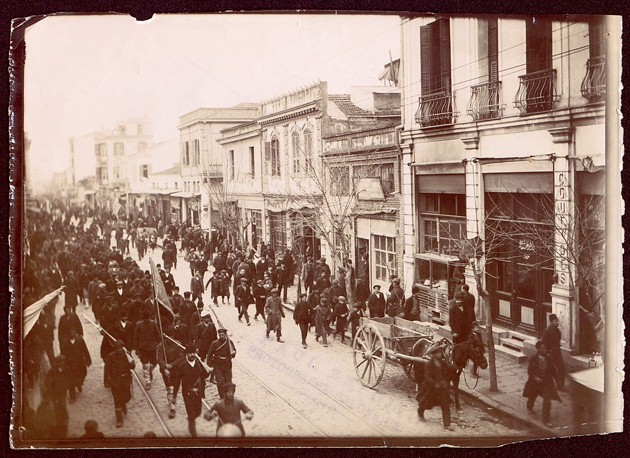
7th Rila Division Enters Thessaloniki 28 October 1912

On the evening of 9 November, at Ayvatovo, 3 km from the city, two Ottoman officers arrived to announce that the garrison had surrendered and therefore asked that the Bulgarians cease firing. General Racho Petrov wanted Tahsin Pasha to sign an additional surrender to the Bulgarians, but the latter refused, believing that he no longer held any authority. The Bulgarian forces halted their advance, and on the following morning Racho Petrov and Dimitar Stanchov went to negotiate with Prince Constantine over the Bulgarian entry into the city.

The Greek 1st Division, headed by Prince Constantine, entered Thessaloniki at 10:30 on 10 November, precisely when the Bulgarians were greeted by the Bulgarian population in the city with the sounds of “Shumi Maritsa”. Despite earlier Greek resistance to Bulgarian entry, later that evening a Bulgarian brigade entered the city. The official reception of Prince Boris took place on the following day because the Bulgarian Crown Prince showed respect to the older Greek Crown Prince.

The entry of both Bulgarian and Greek troops into Thessaloniki caused the first serious strain in Bulgarian-Greek relations. After their march toward Thessaloniki, military necessity soon required the withdrawal of the 7th Rila and 2nd Thracian Divisions toward the Gallipoli Peninsula. The withdrawal of the 7th Rila Division made it easier for the Greeks to establish themselves in Thessaloniki, and they later began gradually occupying the lands north and east of it, despite those territories already being under Bulgarian control.

== Naval operations in the Black Sea ==
=== Battle of Kaliakra ===
The Battle of Kaliakra, usually known as the Attack of the Drazki (Bulgarian: Атаката на Дръзки) in Bulgaria, was a maritime action between four Bulgarian torpedo boats and the Ottoman cruiser Hamidiye in the Black Sea. It took place on 21 November 1912 at 32 miles off Bulgaria's primary port of Varna.

Battle of Kaliakra map (Bulgarian vessels in red, Ottoman in blue)

During the course of the First Balkan War, the Ottoman Empire's supplies were dangerously limited after the battles in Kirk Kilisse and Lule Burgas and the sea route from the Romanian port of Constanța to Istanbul became vital for the Ottomans. The Ottoman navy also imposed a blockade on the Bulgarian coast and on 15 October, the commander of the cruiser Hamidiye threatened to destroy Varna and Balchik, unless the two towns surrendered. On 21 November an Ottoman convoy was attacked by the four Bulgarian torpedo boats Drazki (Bold), Letyashti (Flying), Smeli (Brave) and Strogi (Strict). The attack was led by Letyashti, whose torpedoes missed, as did those of Smeli and Strogi, Smeli being damaged by a 150 mm round with one of her crewmen wounded. Drazki however got within 100 meters from the Ottoman cruiser and her torpedoes struck the cruiser's starboard side, causing a 10 square meter hole.

However, Hamidiye was not sunk, due to her well-trained crew, strong forward bulkheads, the functionality of all her water pumps and a very calm sea. She did however have 8 crewmen killed and 30 wounded, and was repaired within months. After this encounter, the Ottoman blockade of the Bulgarian coast was significantly loosened.

The acting Commander-in-chief learned by telegram on the morning of November 21 that the cruiser Hamidiye had been damaged off Varna and requested that a support ship be sent to the area. The Navy Commander, unaware of the damage to the Hamidiye, dispatched the cruiser Mecidiye to Varna. Upon learning of the Hamidiye's damage, he sent a tugboat and a salvage vessel. On her return journey to Istanbul, the Hamidiye encountered the Turgut Reis at 11:00 AM. The SMS Weissenburg provided the cruiser with a lifeboat and soldiers to assist in draining the water. At 3:50 PM, it encountered the Mecidiye and the İntibah. At 6:20 PM, it encountered the Zuhaf gunboat and tugboats, and under their escort, entered the Bosphorus, where it was taken to a dock for repairs in the Golden Horn the following morning.

The Hamidiye posed a significant threat to Bulgaria. The ship could have cut off Bulgaria's sea connection with Russia. The Bulgarians aimed to keep the sea link open for Russian aid. The victory at Varna was the greatest success of the Bulgarian navy in its history. The Bulgarian torpedo boats received a warm welcome when they arrived at the port and learned that the Nadezhda gunboat had orders to go to the rescue but could not leave the port because its captain did not know the route out of the minefield. The fact that the torpedoes of three of the Bulgarian boats were found near Sozopol and that Draçki's torpedo was not found showed that Hamidiye was hit by Draçki. After the battle, the Bulgarian torpedo boats were repaired and remained in service. The Bulgarian navy did not engage in another significant conflict until the ceasefire was declared. The surviving parts of the Draçki are exhibited as a museum ship by being mounted on the Stroki hull of the same class.

== List of events ==
=== Bulgarian–Ottoman battles ===
Battle	Year	Bulgaria Commander	Ottoman Empire Commander	Result	Bulgarian casualties	Ottoman casualties
Battle of Kardzhali	1912	Vasil Delov	Mehmed Yaver Pasha	Bulgarian Victory	54	219
Battle of Kirk Kilisse	1912	Radko Dimitriev	Mahmut Pasha	Bulgarian Victory	5,745	3,500–4,500
Battle of Lule Burgas	1912	Radko Dimitriev	Abdullah Pasha	Bulgarian Victory	20,162	24,800
Battle of Alamidere	1912	Vladimir Serafimov	Osman Senai Pasha	Bulgarian Victory	110	180
Battle of Balkan Toresi	1912	Nikola Genev	Mehmet Yaver Pasha	Bulgarian Victory	164	Unknown
Siege of Edirne / Adrianople	1912–13	Nikola Ivanov	Gazi Pasha	Bulgarian Victory	7,953–16,577	55,500–72,000
First Battle of Çatalca	1912	Radko Dimitriev	Nazim Pasha	Ottoman Victory	12,012	5,000–10,000
Naval Battle of Kaliakra	1912	Dimitar Dobrev	Hüseyin Bey	Bulgarian Victory	1	38
Battle of Merhamli	1912	Nikola Genev	Mehmed Yaver Pasha	Bulgarian Victory	Unknown	9,600
Battle of Bulair	1913	Georgi Todorov	Mustafa Kemal	Bulgarian Victory	530	16,000
Second Battle of Çatalca	1913	Vasil Kutinchev	Ahmet Pasha	Indecisive	Unknown	Unknown
Battle of Şarköy	1913	Stiliyan Kovachev	Enver Pasha	Bulgarian Victory	Unknown	2,779

== Aftermath ==
Weapons that had never before been used in Europe or anywhere else in the world were employed in the First Balkan War In particular, for the first time since the Italo-Turkish War, aviation was used in military operations, including bombing the enemy. Weapons tested during the First Balkan War were later used on a massive scale in World War I.

On May 30, 1913, after a month of trench warfare, the Ottoman Empire on one side and Greece, Bulgaria, Serbia, and Montenegro on the other signed a peace treaty in London. The only thing that had changed on the front since the attempted armistice was that Adrianople had fallen, and the Ottoman Empire could no longer lay claim to it. According to the treaty:

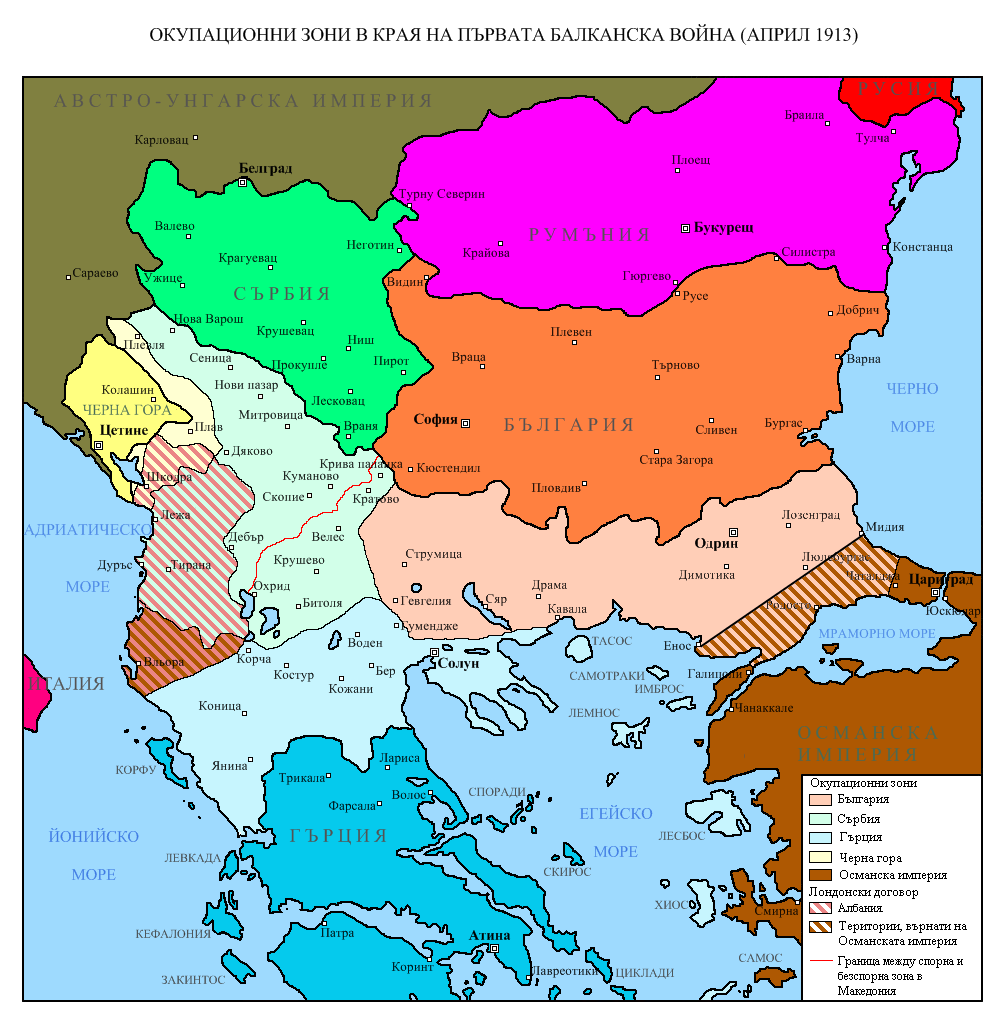
Territories under the control of the belligerents at the end of April 1913.

1. From the moment the treaty between the Balkan League and the Ottoman Empire was signed, “peace for all time” was established.
2. The Ottoman Empire ceded control of nearly all its European territories to the Balkan League (with the exception of Albania, whose status was to be determined later, and Istanbul and its environs).
3. The Great Powers were to begin negotiations on the status of Albania and ensure its security.
4. The Ottoman Empire relinquished Crete to the Balkan League.
5. The Great Powers were to assume responsibility for the Turks living on the islands of the Aegean Sea and along its coasts (except for Crete and the vicinity of Mount Athos).
6. A special commission was convened in Paris to address the economic consequences of the war.
7. The remaining postwar issues (regarding prisoners of war, trade, relations, and others) were to be settled by separate, more specialized treaties.

Although the Ottoman Empire relinquished most of its European territories in favor of the Balkan League, one issue remained. The member states of the League were to divide the conquered territories among themselves, without foreign mediation. This was problematic, as the Greeks sought to unite all the Aegean coastlines into a single Greece; the Bulgarian government wanted to create a Greater Bulgaria; the Serbs sought access to the Adriatic Sea and the greatest possible expansion of their country’s borders; and the Montenegrins sought to annex northern Albania to the Kingdom of Montenegro. Consequently, a dispute arose among the allies over the sovereignty of Macedonia, Thrace, and northern Albania. None of the founding states of the Balkan League was fully satisfied with the Treaty of London or the outcome of the war. Serbia did not gain access to the Adriatic due to the creation of the new state of Albania; Montenegro did not occupy Shkodër; and Greece did not annex Thrace. Bulgaria was dissatisfied with Serbian claims to Macedonia, and just a few months after the peace treaty with Turkey was signed, the Second Balkan War began, the outcome of which became one of the causes of World War I.

The disregard for the Bulgarian-Greek dispute over Southern Macedonia and the rejection of the principle of the region’s indivisibility during the negotiations to establish the Balkan League led to its collapse immediately after the peace treaty with the Ottomans was signed. Russia’s efforts to fulfill the role of arbitrator, as stipulated in the treaty between Bulgaria and Serbia, failed. On May 19, 1913, (two days after the signing of the Treaty of London) the Greek–Serbian Treaty was concluded, whereby the two countries guaranteed their common border in Macedonia against attempts by Bulgaria to alter the status quo. On June 16, the Bulgarian army attacked Serbian and Greek positions, thereby triggering the Second Balkan War. It ended with a victory and additional territorial gains for Serbia and Greece at Bulgaria’s expense. The Ottoman Empire took advantage of the inter-allied conflict and regained Adrianople Thrace.

== Sources ==
- Balkanskata voyna 1912–1913 [The Balkan War 1912–1913] (in Bulgarian). Sofia: Darzhavno voenno izdatelstvo. 1961.
- Ministerstvo na voynata (1930). Voynata mezhdu Balgariya i Turtsiya 1912–1913 god. Tom V: Operatsiite okolo Odrinskata krepost, Kniga I [The War Between Bulgaria and Turkey 1912–1913, Volume V: Operations around the Adrianople Fortress, Book I] (in Bulgarian). Sofia: Ministerstvo na voynata.
- Ivanov, Nikola (1924). Balkanskata voyna 1912–1913 god. Deystviyata na II armiya. Obsada i ataka na Odrinskata krepost [The Balkan War 1912–1913. Operations of the Second Army. Siege and Assault of the Adrianople Fortress] (in Bulgarian). Sofia.
- Ministerstvo na voynata, Shtab na voyskata (1928). Voynata mezhdu Balgariya i Turtsiya, vol. II [The War Between Bulgaria and Turkey, vol. II] (in Bulgarian). Sofia: Darzhavna pechatnitsa.
- Hall, Richard C. (2000). The Balkan Wars, 1912–1913: Prelude to the First World War. Routledge. ISBN 0-415-22946-4.
- Erickson, Edward J. (2003). Defeat in Detail: The Ottoman Army in the Balkans, 1912–1913. Greenwood Publishing Group. ISBN 0-275-97888-5.
- Марков, Г. България в Балканския съюз срещу Османската империя 1912-1913 г., "Наука и изкуство", София 1989 (електронно издание „Книги за Македония“, 19.08.2009)
- Markov, Georgi (2012). Balgariya v Balkanskiya sayuz sreshtu Osmanskata imperiya, 1911–1913 [Bulgaria in the Balkan League against the Ottoman Empire, 1911–1913] (in Bulgarian). Sofia: Zahariy Stoyanov. ISBN 978-954-09-0725-3.
- Vachkov, Aleksandar (2005). Balkanskata voyna 1912–1913 [The Balkan War 1912–1913] (in Bulgarian). Sofia: Anzhela. ISBN 978-954-90587-2-7.
- 90 godini ot Balkanskata voyna 1912–1913: Yubileyna voennonauchna konferentsiya [90 Years Since the Balkan War 1912–1913: Jubilee Military-Scientific Conference] (in Bulgarian). Sofia: Voenno izdatelstvo. 2003. ISBN 954-509-267-X.
- Stoyanov, Aleksandar (2015). Istoriya na voynite: Balkanskite voyni na balgarskata armiya [History of the Wars: The Balkan Wars of the Bulgarian Army] (in Bulgarian). Sofia: Milenium. ISBN 978-954-515-328-0.
- Fotakis, Zisis (2005). Greek Naval Strategy and Policy, 1910–1919. London: Routledge. ISBN 978-0-415-35014-3.
- Hooton, Edward R. (2014). Prelude to the First World War: The Balkan Wars 1912–1913. Fonthill Media. ISBN 978-1-78155-180-6.
- Langensiepen, Bernd; Güleryüz, Ahmet (1995). The Ottoman Steam Navy, 1828–1923. London: Conway Maritime Press/Bloomsbury. ISBN 0-85177-610-8.
- Murray, Nicholas (2013). The Rocky Road to the Great War: the Evolution of Trench Warfare to 1914. Dulles, Virginia, Potomac Books ISBN 978-1-59797-553-7
- Zürcher, Erik Jan (2004). Turkey: A Modern History (3rd ed.). London: I.B. Tauris. ISBN 978-1-86064-958-5.
- Ahmad, Feroz (2014). Turkey: The Quest for Identity (2nd, revised ed.). Oneworld Publications. ISBN 978-1-78074-301-1.
- Pettifer, James. War in the Balkans: Conflict and Diplomacy Before World War I (IB Tauris, 2015).
- Akmeşe, Handan Nezir (2015). The Birth of Modern Turkey: The Ottoman Military and the March to World I. I.B. Tauris.
- Schurman, Jacob Gould (2004). The Balkan Wars, 1912 to 1913. Whitefish, MT: Kessinger. ISBN 1-4191-5345-5.
- Seton-Watson, R. W. (2009) [1917]. The Rise of Nationality in the Balkans. Charleston, SC: BiblioBazaar. ISBN 978-1-113-88264-6.
- Trix, Frances. "Peace-mongering in 1913: the Carnegie International Commission of Inquiry and its Report on the Balkan Wars." First World War Studies 5.2 (2014): 147–162.
- Uyar, Mesut; Erickson, Edward (2009). A Military History of the Ottomans: From Osman to Atatürk. Santa Barbara, CA: Praeger Security International. ISBN 978-0-275-98876-0.
- Stojančević, Vladimir. Prvi balkanski rat: okrugli sto povodom 75. godišnjice 1912–1987, 28. i 29. oktobar 1987.
- The Bulgarian Ministry of War (1928). Войната между България и Турция през 1912–1913 г. [The War between Bulgaria and Turkey, 1912–1913]. Vol. I, II, VI, VII. State Printing House.
- Langensiepen, Bernd; Güleryüz, Ahmet (1995). The Ottoman Steam Navy 1828–1923. London: Conway Maritime Press. ISBN 978-0-85177-610-1.
- Büyüktuğrul, Afif (1974). Osmanlı Deniz Harp Tarihi (PDF). Genelkurmay Başkanlığı Deniz Kuvvetleri Komutanlığı. Archived from the original (PDF) on 8 October 2020.
- Markov, Georgi (1989). Balgariya v Balkanskiya sayuz sreshtu Osmanskata imperiya, 1912–1913 [Bulgaria in the Balkan League against the Ottoman Empire, 1912–1913] (in Bulgarian). Sofia: Nauka i izkustvo.
- Monroe, Will Seymour (1914). Bulgaria and her People: With an Account of the Balkan wars, Macedonia, and the Macedonia Bulgars. Boston: The Page Company.
- Harbottle, T.B.; Bruce, George (1979). Harbottle's Dictionary of Battles (2nd ed.). Granada. ISBN 0-246-11103-8.
- Levy, ed. (2002). Jews, Turks, Ottomans: A Shared History, Fifteenth Through the Twentieth Century. Syracuse University Press.
- Johnson, David (August 1997). "Splendid Fellows, Splendidly Led". Military History. Vol. 14, no. 3. Archived from the original on 2001-08-22.
- Skoko, Savo; Opačić, Petar (1990). Vojvoda Stepa Stepanović u Ratovima Srbije, 1876–1918 [Vojvoda Stepa Stepanović in the Wars of Serbia, 1876–1918] (6 ed.). Belgrade: BIGZ. ISBN 86-13-00453-9.
- Balkaya, İhsan Sabri (2005). Ali Fethi Okyar (29 Nisan 1880-7 Mayıs 1943) (in Turkish). Ankara: Türk Tarih Kurumu. ISBN 9751617162.
- Milanov, Yordan (2008). The Air Forces of Bulgaria During the 1912–1945 Wars. Sofia: Air Group 2000 Publishing House.
- Mogilevich, A. A.; Ayrapetyan, M. E. (1940). On the Path to the World War of 1914–1918. L.
- Zadokhin, A. G.; Nizovsky, A. Yu. (2000). Пороховой погреб Европы. Военные тайны XX века (in Russian). Moscow: Veche. p. 416. ISBN 5-7838-0719-2.
- Dimitrov, Str.; Manchev, Kr. (1999). История на балканските народи (in Bulgarian). Vol. II. Sofia: Paradigma. ISBN 954-9536-19-X.

Further reading

- Jelavich, Barbara (1983). History of the Balkans: Twentieth Century. Vol. II. Cambridge University Press. ISBN 978-0-521-27459-3.
