= Battle of Kardzhali =

1912 battle of the First Balkan War

Battle of Kircaali Battle of Kardzhali
- Part of the Bulgarian front of the First Balkan War
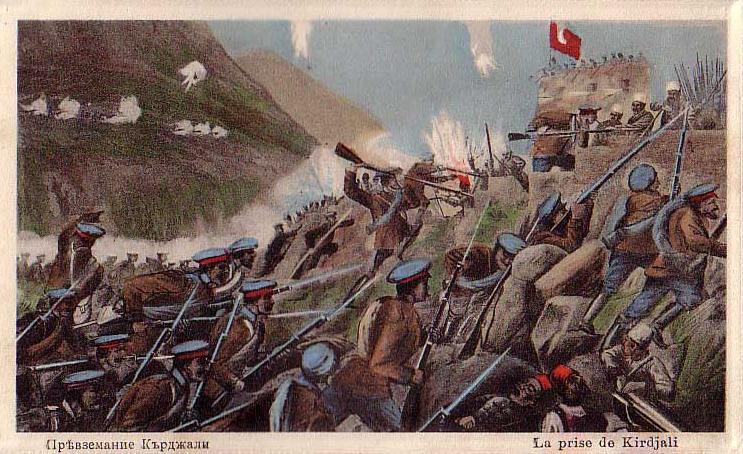
- The Bulgarians capture Kardzhali
Date	21 October 1912^{[a]}
Location	Kircaali, Sanjak of Gümülcine, Adrianople Vilayet, Ottoman Empire (now Kardzhali, Bulgaria) 41°39′N 25°22′E
Result	Bulgarian victory

Belligerents
Bulgaria	Ottoman Empire

Commanders and leaders
(Bulgaria) Vasil Delov	(Ottoman Empire) Mehmed Yaver Pasha

Strength
8,700; 42 guns	c. 9,000; 8 guns

Casualties and losses
9 killed 45 wounded	200 killed and wounded 19 captured

The Battle of Kircaali or Battle of Kardzhali was part of the First Balkan War between the armies of Bulgaria and the Ottoman Empire. It took place on 21 October 1912, when the Bulgarian Haskovo Detachment defeated the Ottoman Kırcaali Detachment of Yaver Pasha and permanently joined Kardzhali and the Eastern Rhodopes to Bulgaria. The anniversary of that event is celebrated annually on 21 October as a holiday of the city.

== Positions, strength and plans ==
Shortly before the war between Bulgaria and the Ottoman Empire, the 2nd Brigade of the 2nd Thracian Infantry Division (28th and 40th Infantry Regiments, reinforced by the 3rd Artillery Regiments) was deployed in the area around Haskovo and had orders to cover the routes to Plovdiv and Stara Zagora. After the correction of the Bulgarian-Ottoman border in 1886 following the Unification of Bulgaria, the Ottomans controlled Kardzhali and the surrounding mountain ridges. Their army in the region was dangerously close to the railway between Plovdiv and Harmanli and the base of the Bulgarian armies which were to advance into Eastern Thrace. The commander of the 2nd Army General Nikola Ivanov ordered Delov to push the Ottomans to the south of the Arda river.

The Bulgarian Haskovo Detachment numbered 8,700 soldiers with 42 guns. and opposed the Ottoman Kırcaali Reserve Division (Kırcaali Redif Fırkası) and in the west the left group of the Bulgarian Rodopo Detachment opposed the Ottoman Kırcaali Home Guard Division (Kırcaali Müstahfız Fırkası) that were the parts of the Ottoman Kırcaali Detachment under Yaver Pasha, which was much larger (24,000) but was dispersed and with fewer artillery pieces.

== Advance of the Haskovo Detachment ==
On the first day of the war, 18 October 1912, Delov's detachment advanced south across the border in four columns. The next day, they defeated the Ottoman troops at the villages of Kovancılar (present day: Pchelarovo) and Göklemezler (present day: Stremtsi) and then headed for Kardzhali. The detachment of Yaver Pasha left the town in disorder. With its advance towards Gumuljina, the Haskovo detachment threatened communications between the Ottoman armies in Thrace and Macedonia. For this reason, the Ottomans ordered Yaver Pasha to counter-attack before the Bulgarians could reach Kardzhali but did not send him reinforcements. To follow this order he had in command 9 tabors and 8 guns.

However, the Bulgarians were not aware of the strength of the enemy and on 19 October the Bulgarian High Command (the Headquarters of the Active Army under General Ivan Fichev) ordered General Ivanov to stop the advance of the Haskovo Detachment because it was considered risky. The commander of the 2nd Army, however, did not withdraw his orders and gave Delov freedom of action. The detachment continued with the advance on 20 October. The march was slowed by the torrential rains and the slow movement of the artillery but the Bulgarians reached the heights to the north of Kardzhali before the Ottomans could reorganize.

In the early morning of 21 October Yaver Pasha engaged the Bulgarians in the outskirts of the town. Due to their superior artillery and attacks on bayonet the soldiers of the Haskovo Detachment overran the Ottoman defenses and prevented their attempts to outflank them from the west. The Ottomans were in turn vulnerable to outflanking from the same direction and had to retreat for a second time to the south of the Arda River, leaving behind large quantities of munitions and equipment. At 16:00 the Bulgarians entered Kardzhali.

== Aftermath ==
As a result of the battle most of the population left the town. The Turkish inhabitants of the area fled during the Bulgarian advance.

The defeated Ottomans retreated to Mestanlı (present day: Momchilgrad), while the Haskovo Detachment prepared defenses along the Arda. Thus the flank and the rear of the Bulgarian armies advancing towards Adrianople and Constantinople were secured. Concerned that after the fall of Kardzhali the Bulgarians would cut off the railway between Salonika and Dedeagach, the Ottoman High Command decided to distract the Bulgarians. Its haste orders for counter-attack of the Eastern Army led to the crushing defeat of the Ottomans in the battle of Kirk Kilisse. The Bulgarian command did not proceed with the advance after the fall of Kardzhali. Instead of taking Gumuljina, on 23 October the main forces of the Haskovo Datachment were ordered to go east and participate in the siege of Adrianople. Only a small squad was left in Kardzhali.

== Notes ==
- a. ^{[a]} According to the Old Style the battle took place on 8 October. For more information see Old Style and New Style dates

== Sources ==
- Erickson, Edward J. (2003). Defeat in Detail: The Ottoman Army in the Balkans, 1912–1913. Westport, Connecticut: Praeger. ISBN 978-0-275-97888-4.
- Ministerstvo na voynata (1930). Voynata mezhdu Balgariya i Turtsiya 1912–1913 god. Tom V: Operatsiite okolo Odrinskata krepost, Kniga I [The War Between Bulgaria and Turkey 1912–1913, Volume V: Operations around the Adrianople Fortress, Book I] (in Bulgarian). Sofia: Ministerstvo na voynata.
- Ivanov, Nikola (1924). Balkanskata voyna 1912–1913 god. Deystviyata na II armiya. Obsada i ataka na Odrinskata krepost [The Balkan War 1912–1913. Operations of the Second Army. Siege and Assault of the Adrianople Fortress] (in Bulgarian). Sofia.
- Balkanskata voyna 1912–1913 [The Balkan War 1912–1913] (in Bulgarian). Sofia: Darzhavno voenno izdatelstvo. 1961.
