= Kırcaali Detachment =

Kırcaali Detachment Kırcaali Müfrezesi
- Active: 1912–November 28, 1912
- Country: Ottoman Empire
- Allegiance: Eastern Army
- Size: Detachment
- Garrison/HQ: Kırcaali (present day: Kardzhali); İskeçe (present day: Xanthi)
- Patron: Sultans of the Ottoman Empire
- Engagements: Battle of Kırcaali; Battle of Alamidere; Battle of Balkan Toresi; Battle of Merhamli

Commanders
- Notable commanders: Mehmed Yaver Pasha

The Kırcaali Detachment of the Ottoman Empire (Modern Turkish: Kırcaali Müfrezesi or Kırcaali Kolordusu ) was one of the Detachments under the command of the Ottoman Eastern Army. It was formed in Kırcaali (present day: Kardzhali) area during the First Balkan War.

== Balkan Wars ==
=== Order of Battle, October 17, 1912 ===
On October 17, 1912, the detachment was structured as follows:

- Kırcaali Detachment HQ (Thrace, under the command of the Eastern Army)
  - Kırcaali Redif Division
  - Kırcaali Müstahfız (Home Guard) Division (provisional)
  - 36th Infantry Regiment

== See also ==
- Battle of Merhamli
