= Karadağ Border General Forces =

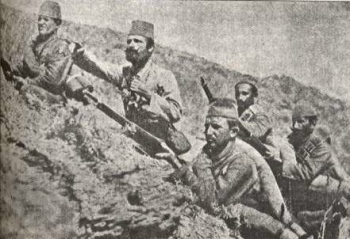
- Ottoman soldiers at Montenegrin Border
- Active: November 9, 1912-
- Country: Ottoman Empire
- Allegiance: Western Army
- Size: Corps
- Garrison/HQ: Debre-i Bala (present day: Debar)
- Patron: Sultans of the Ottoman Empire

Commanders
- Notable commanders: Ferik Mahmud Hayred Pasha

The Karadağ Border General Forces Corps of the Ottoman Empire (Turkish: Karadağ Sınır Umum Kuvvetleri) was an ad hoc corps under the command of the Ottoman Western Army during the First Balkan War. It was formed in the vicinity of Yakova (Gjakova) and Pirzerin (Prizren) with remnant units of İpek Detachment and Priştine Detachment and its headquarters was established in Derbe-i Bala (Debar) on November 9, 1912.

== Order of Battle, November 9, 1912 ==
On November 9, 1912, the corps was structured as follows:

- Karadağ Border General Forces HQ (Debre-i Bala, under the command of the Western Army)
  - 21st Division (Djavit Pasha)
  - Provisional Infantry Division (Fethi Bey)
