= Pristine =

Pristine, meaning unsullied, or unmodified from a natural state, may also refer to:

- Pristine (band), Norwegian blues rock band
- Pristine (company), software company
- Pristine apple, hybrid cultivar
- Pristine Audio, music company
- Priştine Detachment, Ottoman Empire military unit

== See also ==
- Pristina, the capital of Kosovo
