= Priştine Detachment =

Military unit in the Ottoman Empire

Priştine Detachment Priştine Müfrezesi
- Active: October–November 3, 1912
- Country: Ottoman Empire
- Allegiance: Vardar Army
- Size: Detachment
- Garrison/HQ: Priştine (present day: Pristina)
- Patron: Sultans of the Ottoman Empire

Commanders
- Notable commanders: Mehmet Pasha

The Priştine Detachment of the Ottoman Empire (Turkish: Priştine Müfrezesi) was one of the Detachments under the command of the Ottoman Vardar Army of the Western Army. It was formed in Priştine (present day: Pristina) area for the defense of Kosovo during the First Balkan War.

== Balkan Wars ==
=== Order of Battle, October 19, 1912 ===
On October 19, 1912, the detachment was structured as follows:

- Priştine Detachment HQ (Serbian Front, under the command of the Vardar Army of the Western Army)
  - Redif Infantry Regiments x 2
