= Struma Corps =

Military unit of the Ottoman Empire

Sturma Corps Usturma Kolordusu
- Active: 1912–
- Country: Ottoman Empire
- Allegiance: Western Army
- Size: Corps
- Garrison/HQ: Usturma (Struma)
- Patron: Sultans of the Ottoman Empire

The Struma Corps or Usturma Corps of the Ottoman Empire (Turkish: Usturma Kolordusu) was one of the corps under the command of the Ottoman Western Army. It was formed in Ustruma (Struma) area during the First Balkan War.

== Balkan Wars ==
=== Order of Battle, October 19, 1912 ===
On October 19, 1912, the army's order of battle was as follows:

- Struma Corps HQ (Bulgarian Front, under the command of the Western Army)
  - 14th Division
  - Serez Redif Division
  - Nevrekop Detachment
