= Scutari Corps =

Scutari Corps İşkodra Kolordusu
- Active: September 18, 1912–
- Country: Ottoman Empire
- Allegiance: Western Army
- Size: Corps
- Garrison/HQ: Scutari (present day: Shkodër)
- Patron: Sultans of the Ottoman Empire

Commanders
- Notable commanders: Miralay Hasan Riza Bey

The Scutari Corps, Işkodra Corps or Shkodër Corps of the Ottoman Empire (Turkish: İşkodra Kolordusu) was one of the corps under the command of the Ottoman Western Army. It was formed in Scutari (present day: Shkodër) area during the First Balkan War.

== Balkan Wars ==
=== Order of Battle, October 19, 1912 ===
On October 19, 1912, the corps was structured as follows:

- Scutari Corps HQ (Montenegrin Front, under the command of the Western Army, commander: Kurmay Miralay Hasan Riza Bey, chief of staff: Kurmay Kaymakam Abdurrahman Nafiz Bey)
  - 24th Division (commander: Kurmay Miralay Hasan Riza Bey)
    - 70th Infantry Regiment
    - 71st Infantry Regiment
    - 72nd Infantry Regiment
    - 24th Artillery Regiment
    - 24th Rifle Battalion
  - Elbesan Redif Division (commander: Kurmay Miralay Djemal Bey, chief of staff: Staff Captain Asim Bey)
    - Elbasan Redif Regiment (commander: Staff Captain Omer Efendi)
      - Elbasan Redif Battalion
      - Libraşt Redif Battalion
      - Gramış Redif Battalion
    - Tiran Redif Regiment (commander: Staff Captain Edhem Efendi)
      - Tiran Redif Battalion
      - Erzen Redif Battalion
      - Akçahisar Redif Battalion
    - Berat Redif Regiment (commander: Staff Captain Arif Efendi)
      - Berat Redif Battalion
      - Devol Redif Battalion
      - Skrapar Redif Battalion
    - Draç Redif Regiment (commander: Staff Captain M. Salim Efendi)
      - Draç Redif Battalion
      - Peklin Redif Battalion
      - Kavala Redif Battalion
      - Bosna Redif Battalion
  - Provisional Regular Division (commander: Kurmay Miralay Sadik Bey, chief of staff: Staff Captain Sherif Bey)
    - 3rd battalion of the 50th Infantry Regiment
    - 1st battalion of the 51st Infantry Regiment
    - 1st and 2nd battalions of the 53rd Infantry Regiment
    - 54th Infantry Regiment
  - Scutari Fortified Area Command
  - Debre Redif Battalion
  - Debre-i Bâlâ Redif Battalion
  - Debre-i Zîr Redif Battalion
  - Mat Redif Battalion
  - Rakalar Redif Battalion
