= Mehmed Şükrü Pasha =

Ottoman general

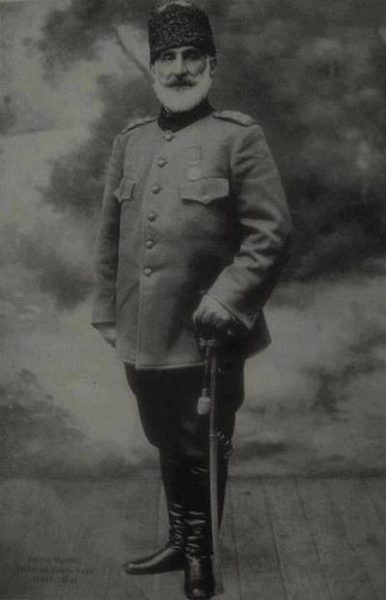
- Lieutenant General Mehmed Şükrü Pasha.
- Born: Mehmed Şükrü; 1857; Erzurum, Ottoman Empire
- Died: 1916 (aged 58–59); Istanbul, Ottoman Empire
- Military career
- Allegiance: Ottoman Empire
- Branch: Ottoman Army
- Service years: 1879–1916
- Rank: Lieutenant General
- Conflicts: First Balkan War; Bulgarian Front; Siege of Adrianople (1912–1913)

Mehmed Şükrü Pasha (Turkish: Mehmet Şükrü Paşa; 1857 – 5 June 1916) was a Turkish general (Birindji ferik) in the Ottoman Army.

== Biography ==
He was the only child of Kolağası (Senior Captain) Mustafa and Muhsine of the Turkish Aybakan family, and was born in Erzurum in 1857. He started his education in Erzincan Military High School with great interest in military service when he was a child, but after his father's death, his mother remarried, he got offended, moved away from his environment, entered the Sütlüce Artillery School in Istanbul, and graduated from the War College in 1879 as an Artillery Lieutenant. He defended the city of Edirne, which was besieged by the Bulgarians during the Balkan Wars, under difficult conditions for 155 days. There is a monument in Edirne built in his name.

He died on 5 June 1916 at his home in Istanbul. He was buried in Merkezefendi Cemetery.
