= Yanya Corps =

Yanya Corps Yanya Kolordusu
- Active: 1912–
- Country: Ottoman Empire
- Allegiance: Western Army
- Size: Corps
- Garrison/HQ: Yanya (present day: Ioannina)
- Patron: Sultans of the Ottoman Empire

Commanders
- Notable commanders: Mirliva Esad Pasha

The Yanya Corps or Independent Yanya Corps of the Ottoman Empire (Turkish: Yanya Kolordusu) was one of the major formations under the command of the Ottoman Western Army. It was formed in Yanya (present-day Ioannina) area during the First Balkan War. Its commander was Esat Pasha. It fought the battles of Gribovo and Pente Pigadia against the Greek Army of Epirus. Pushed back to the Yanya Fortified Area, it held out against two Greek assaults but was eventually defeated and capitulated at the Battle of Bizani in 4–6 March 1913.

== Balkan wars ==
=== Order of battle, 19 October 1912 ===
On 19 October 1912, the corps was structured as follows:

Yanya Corps HQ (commander: Esad Pasha, chief of staff: Binbaşı Ali Fuad Bey, later: Kaymakam Turgut Bey)

- 23rd Regular Infantry Division (commander: Djevat Pasha, since March 1913: Ali Fuad Bey)
  - 67th Infantry Regiment (commander: Miralay Mehmed Ali Bey, later: Binbaşı Ismed Bey)
  - 68th Infantry Regiment (commander: Kaymakam Arif Bey)
  - 69th Infantry Regiment (commander: Kaymakam Necati Bey, later: Binbaşı Seyfeddin Bey)
  - 23rd Artillery Regiment
- Yanya Reserve Infantry Division (commander: Miralay Celal, since January 20, 1913: Kaymakam Bahattin Bey)
  - Yanya Redif Regiment
  - Ergiri Redif Regiment (commander: Kaymakam Djevdet Bey)
  - Avlonya Redif Regiment (commander: Kaymakam Ali Vefa Bey, KIA on October 8, 1912)
  - Yanya Brigade (commander: Miralay Hamdi Bey)
- Yanya Fortified Area Command (commander: Kaymakam Vehib Bey, chief of staff: Binbaşı Mehmed Emin Bey, later: Yüzbaşı Yusuf Ziya Efendi, HQ officer: Teğmen Ismail Hakki Efendi)
  - Artillery Regiment (commander: Kaymakam Shukri Bey, later: Binbaşı Sari Emin Bey)
  - Engineers (commander: Binbaşı Rashid Bey)

=== Reinforcement ===
- 19th Division (commander: Kaymakam Ahmed Faik Bey, 9 December 1912 – demolished on December 24, 1912)
- 21st Division (Mirliva Djavid Pasha (KIA on December 12, 1912, later: Miralay Sami Bey (demolished on December 24, 1912, chief of staff: Yüzbaşı Avni Efendi)
  - 61st Infantry Regiment (commander: Miralay Sami Bey)
  - 62nd Infantry Regiment (commander: Binbaşı Namik Bey)
  - 63rd Infantry Regiment (commander: Binbaşı Shevki Bey)
  - Köprülü Redif Regiment and İştip Redif Regiment (commander: Mehmed Pasha)
  - Grebene Detachment (commander: Yüzbaşı Bekir Fikri Efendi)
- 13th Division (commander: Galib Pasha, demolished on December 24, 1912, chief of staff: Yüzbaşı Osman Zati Efendi)
  - 38th Infantry Regiment (commander: Kaymakam Saadeddin Bey)
  - 39th Infantry Regiment (commander: Kaymakam Hasan Vasfi Bey)
  - 13th Infantry Regiment (commander: Binbaşı Nejdeddin Bey)
  - Gendarmerie Battalion (commander: Binbaşı Abdülkerim Bey)
