= İpek Detachment =

Turkish military unit

İpek Detachment İpek Müfrezesi
- Active: October–November 3, 1912
- Country: Ottoman Empire
- Allegiance: Western Army
- Size: Detachment
- Garrison/HQ: İpek (present day: Peć)
- Patron: Sultans of the Ottoman Empire

Commanders
- Notable commanders: Cavit Pasha

The İpek Detachment of the Ottoman Empire (Turkish: İpek Müfrezesi) was one of the Detachment under the command of the Ottoman Western Army. It was formed in İpek (present day: Peć) area during the First Balkan War.

== Balkan Wars ==
=== Order of Battle, October 19, 1912 ===
On October 19, 1912, the detachment was structured as follows:

- İpek Detachment HQ (Montenegrin Front, under the command of the Western Army)
  - 21st Division
    - 61st Infantry Regiment
    - 62nd Infantry Regiment
  - Pirzerin Redif Division
