= Western Army (Ottoman Empire) =

- Active: 1912-
- Country: Ottoman Empire
- Type: Field Army
- Garrison/HQ: Salonika
- Patron: Sultans of the Ottoman Empire

Commanders
- Notable commanders: Ali Rizah Pasha

The Western Army of the Ottoman Empire (Turkish: Garp Ordusu) was one of the field armies of the Ottoman Army. It was formed during the mobilization phase of the First Balkan War. It confronted Serbian, Greek, Montenegrin and Bulgarian armies. It numbered approximately 154,000 troops and 372 artillery.

== Order of Battle, 19 October 1912 ==
On 19 October 1912, the army was structured as follows:

- Serbian Front:
  - Vardar Army (app. 65,000 men and 172 artillery) on Serbian approach. Commander was Gen. Zeki Pasha
- Bulgarian Front:
  - Ustruma Corps
- Montenegrin Front:
  - Provisional İşkodra Corps
  - İpek Detachment
- Greek Front:
  - VIII Provisional Corps
  - Yanya Corps
- Karaburun Detachment
- Salonika Reserve Division
