= First Balkan War =

1912–1913 war between the Balkan League and the Ottoman Empire

- Part of the Balkan Wars
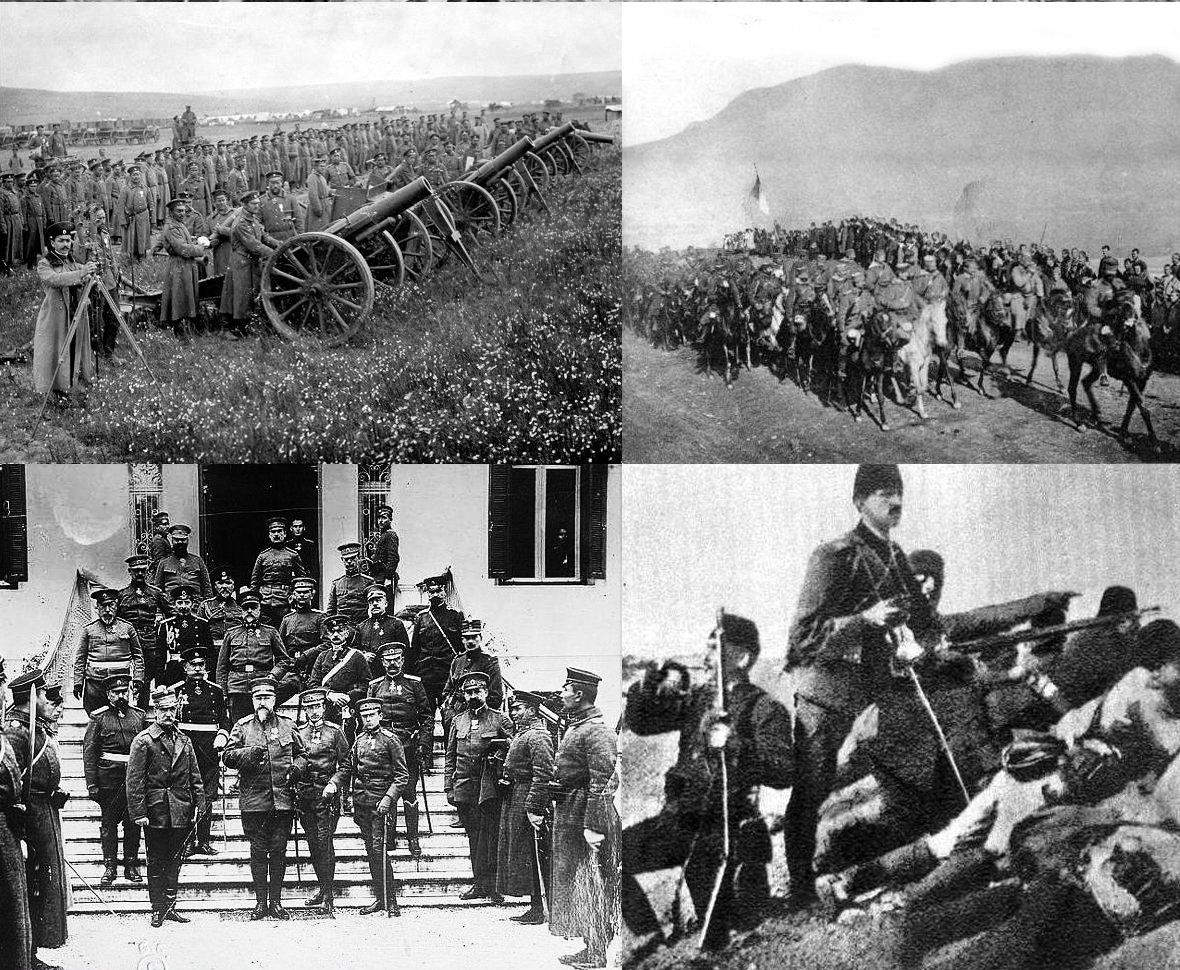
- Clockwise from top right: Serbian forces entering the town of Mitrovica; Ottoman troops at the Battle of Kumanovo; Meeting of the Greek king George I and the Bulgarian tsar Ferdinand I in Thessaloniki; Bulgarian heavy artillery
Date	8 October 1912 – 30 May 1913; (7 months, 3 weeks and 1 day)
Location	Balkan Peninsula
Result	Balkan League victory: Treaty of London; Treaty of Athens
Territorial changes	Ottoman European territory divided between the Balkan League States.

Belligerents
Balkan League: Bulgaria; Serbia; Greece; Montenegro	Ottoman Empire

Commanders and leaders
(Bulgaria) Ferdinand I; (Bulgaria) Mihail Savov; (Bulgaria) Ivan Fichev; (Bulgaria) Vasil Kutinchev; (Bulgaria) Nikola Ivanov; (Bulgaria) Radko Dimitriev; (Bulgaria) Stiliyan Kovachev; (Bulgaria) Georgi Todorov; (Bulgaria) Dimitar Dobrev; (Kingdom of Serbia) Peter I; (Kingdom of Serbia) Radomir Putnik; (Kingdom of Serbia) Prince Alexander; (Kingdom of Serbia) Stepa Stepanović; (Kingdom of Serbia) Božidar Janković; (Kingdom of Serbia) Mihailo Živković; (Kingdom of Greece) George I X; (Kingdom of Greece) Eleftherios Venizelos; (Kingdom of Greece) Constantine I; (Kingdom of Greece) Panagiotis Danglis; (Kingdom of Greece) Pavlos Kountouriotis; (Kingdom of Greece) Ioannis Damianos; (Kingdom of Greece) Konstantinos Sapountzakis; (Kingdom of Montenegro) Nicholas I; (Kingdom of Montenegro) Prince Danilo Petrović; (Kingdom of Montenegro) Janko Vukotić	(Ottoman Empire) Mehmed V (surrendered); (Ottoman Empire) Mahmud Shevket Pasha; (Ottoman Empire) Nazım Pasha X; (Ottoman Empire) Zeki Pasha; (Ottoman Empire) Esat Pasha (surrendered); (Ottoman Empire) Abdullah Pasha (POW); (Ottoman Empire) Ali Rıza Pasha; (Ottoman Empire) Hasan Tahsin Pasha (surrendered); (Ottoman Empire) İsmail Hakkı Pasha; (Ottoman Empire) Hasan Rıza Pasha X; (Ottoman Empire) Mehmed Şükrü Pasha; (Ottoman Empire) Essad Pasha Toptani (surrendered); (Ottoman Empire) İsmail Enver Bey; (Ottoman Empire) Rauf Pasha

Strength
(Tsardom of Bulgaria (1908–1946)) 450,000+ men; (Kingdom of Serbia) 230,000 men; (Kingdom of Greece) 125,000 men; (Kingdom of Montenegro) 44,500 men; Total: 850,000+	(Ottoman Empire) 436,742 men initially (significantly more than the Balkan League by the end)

Casualties and losses
Bulgaria: 14,000 killed; 4,926 missing; 50,000 wounded; 19,000 dead of disease; Serbia: 5,000 killed; 18,000 wounded; 6,698 dead of disease; Greece: 5,169 killed; 23,502 wounded; 1,550 dead of disease; Montenegro: 2,836 killed; 6,602 wounded; 406 dead of disease; Total: 156,139 killed, wounded, or died of disease	Ottoman Empire: 50,000 killed; 100,000 wounded; 115,000 captured; 75,000 dead of disease; Total: 340,000 killed, wounded, captured or died of disease
- Numerous civilian casualties (see below...)

The First Balkan War lasted from October 1912 to May 1913 and involved actions of the Balkan League (the Kingdoms of Bulgaria, Serbia, Greece and Montenegro) against the Ottoman Empire. The Balkan states' combined armies overcame the initially numerically inferior (significantly superior by the end of the conflict) and strategically disadvantaged Ottoman armies, achieving rapid success.

The war was a comprehensive and unmitigated disaster for the Ottomans, who lost 83% of their European territories and 69% of their European population. As a result of the war, the League captured and partitioned almost all of the Ottoman Empire's remaining territories in Europe. Ensuing events also led to the creation of an independent Albania, which dissatisfied the Serbs. Bulgaria, meanwhile, was dissatisfied over the division of the spoils in Macedonia and attacked its former allies, Serbia and Greece, on 16 June 1913, which provoked the start of the Second Balkan War.

During the war, many civilians were either killed or forced to flee their homes.

== Background ==
Tensions among the Balkan states over their rival aspirations to the provinces of Ottoman-controlled Rumelia (Eastern Rumelia, Thrace and Macedonia) subsided somewhat after the mid-19th-century intervention by the Great Powers, which aimed to secure both more complete protection for the provinces' Christian majority as well as to maintain the status quo. By 1867, Serbia and Montenegro had both secured their independence, which was confirmed by the Treaty of Berlin (1878). Between 1878 and 1912, the Greece, Bulgaria, and Serbia sponsored insurgent groups in Ottoman Macedonia to fight against the government and each other in a conflict known as the Macedonian Struggle. The question of the viability of Ottoman rule was revived after the Young Turk Revolution in July 1908, which compelled the Ottoman Sultan to restore the suspended constitution of the empire.

Serbia's aspirations to take over Bosnia and Herzegovina were thwarted by the Bosnian crisis, which led to the Austrian annexation of the province in October 1908. The Serbs then directed their war efforts to the south. After the annexation, the Young Turks tried to induce the Muslim population of Bosnia to emigrate to the Ottoman Empire. The Ottoman authorities resettled those who took up the offer in districts of northern Macedonia with few Muslims. The experiment proved to be a catastrophe since the immigrants readily united with the existing population of Albanian Muslims and participated in the series of 1911 Albanian uprisings and the Albanian revolt of 1912. Some Albanian government troops switched sides.

In May 1912, Albanian rebels seeking national autonomy and the re-installment of Sultan Abdul Hamid II to power drove the Young Turkish forces out of Skopje and pressed south towards Manastir (now Bitola), forcing the Young Turks to grant effective autonomy over large regions in June 1912. Serbia, which had been helping to arm the Hamidian and Catholic Albanians rebelling in the Mirditë region; sent secret agents to some of the prominent leaders, taking the revolt as a pretext for war. Serbia, Montenegro, Greece, and Bulgaria had all been in talks about possible offensives against the Ottoman Empire before the 1912 Albanian revolt had broken out, and a formal agreement between Serbia and Montenegro had been signed on 7 March. On 18 October 1912, King Peter I of Serbia issued a declaration, 'To the Serbian People,' which appeared to support Albanians as well as Serbs:

The Turkish governments showed no interest in their duties towards their citizens and turned a deaf ear to all complaints and suggestions. Things got so far out of hand that no one was satisfied with the situation in Turkey in Europe. It also became unbearable for the Serbs, the Greeks, and the Albanians. By the grace of God, I have therefore ordered my brave army to join in the Holy War to free our brethren and to wish for a better future. In Old Serbia, my army will meet not only upon Christian Serbs but also upon Muslim Serbs, who are equally dear to us, and in addition to them, upon Christian and Muslim Albanians with whom our people have shared joy and sorrow for thirteen centuries now. To all of them, we bring freedom, brotherhood and equality.

In a search for allies, Serbia was ready to negotiate a treaty with Bulgaria. The agreement provided that in the event of victory against the Ottomans, Bulgaria would receive all of Macedonia south of the Kriva Palanka–Ohrid line. Bulgaria accepted Serbia's expansion as being to the north of the Shar Mountains (Kosovo). The intervening area was agreed to be "disputed" and would be arbitrated by the Tsar of Russia in the event of a successful war against the Ottoman Empire. During the war, it became apparent that the Albanians did not consider Serbia as a liberator, as had been suggested by King Peter I, and the Serbian forces failed to observe his declaration of amity toward Albanians.

After the successful coup d'état for unification with Eastern Rumelia, Bulgaria began to dream that its national unification would be realized. For that purpose, it developed a large army and was identified as the "Prussia of the Balkans". However, Bulgaria could not win a war alone against the Ottomans.

In Greece, Hellenic Army officers had rebelled in the Goudi coup of August 1909 and secured the appointment of a progressive government under Eleftherios Venizelos, which they hoped would resolve the Crete question in Greece's favour. They also wanted to reverse their defeat in the Greco-Turkish War (1897) by the Ottomans. An emergency military reorganization, led by a French military mission, had been started for that purpose, but its work was interrupted by the outbreak of war in the Balkans. In the discussions that led to Greece joining the Balkan League, Bulgaria refused to commit to any agreement on distributing territorial gains, unlike its deal with Serbia over Macedonia. Bulgaria's diplomatic policy was to push Serbia into one that limited its access to Macedonia while simultaneously refusing any such agreement with Greece. Bulgaria believed that its army could occupy the big part of Aegean Macedonia and the port city of Salonica (Thessaloniki) before the Greeks could do so.

In 1911, Italy had launched an invasion of Tripolitania, now in Libya, which was quickly followed by the occupation of the Dodecanese Islands in the Aegean Sea. The Italians' decisive military victories over the Ottoman Empire and the successful 1912 Albanian revolt encouraged the Balkan states to imagine that they might win a war against the Ottomans. By the spring and summer of 1912, the various Christian Balkan nations had created a network of military alliances, becoming known as the Balkan League.

The Great Powers, most notably France and Austria-Hungary, reacted to the formation of the alliances by trying unsuccessfully to dissuade the Balkan League from going to war. In late September, the League and the Ottoman Empire mobilized their armies. Montenegro was the first to declare war on 25 September (O.S.)/8 October. After issuing an impossible ultimatum to the Ottoman Porte on 13 October, Bulgaria, Serbia and Greece declared war on the Ottomans on 17 October (1912). The declarations of war attracted a large number of war correspondents. An estimated 200 to 300 journalists from around the world covered the war in the Balkans in November 1912.

== Order of battle and plans ==
Political boundaries in the Balkans before the First Balkan War

Due to poor organization, transportation problems and the protracted war with Italy, the Ottoman order of battle only had 12,024 officers, 324,718 other ranks, 47,960 animals, 2,318 artillery pieces and 388 machine guns ready by early October instead of the planned full complement of 750,000 officers and soldiers. A total of 920 officers and 42,607 men of them had been assigned to non-divisional units and services, the remaining 293,206 officers and men were assigned to four armies.

Opposing them and continuing their secret prewar settlements for expansion, the three Slavic allies (Bulgarian, Serbs and Montenegrins) had extensive plans to co-ordinate their war efforts: the Serbs and the Montenegrins in the theatre of Sandžak and the Bulgarians and the Serbs in the Macedonian and the Bulgarians alone in the Thracian theatre.

The bulk of the Bulgarian forces (346,182 men) was to attack Thrace, fighting against the Thracian Ottoman Army of 96,273 men and about 26,000 garrison troops, or about 115,000 personnel in total, according to Hall's, Erickson's and the Turkish General Staff's 1993 studies. It was to be supported by the Kırcaali Detachment of 24,000 military personnel, deployed along the Arda river to prevent the Bulgarians from reaching the Aegean Sea and thus cutting Ottoman transportation and communication links with Macedonia.

The Vardar Army of some 58,000 men was deployed near Kumanovo against the First and Second Serbian Armies of 90,000 Serbian and approx. 50,000 Serbian and Bulgarian men. Approx. 28,000 additional men from the Struma Corps were to protect the right flank of the Vardar Army and prevent Bulgarian encroachment along the Struma.

The Yanya Corps (22,000 men) was to defend Epirus and Albania from the Greek Army of Epirus, while the VIII Corps (29,000 men) was deployed to guard the Thessalian mountain passes leading to Thessaloniki. Additional 25,000 men of the Işkodra Corps were stationed in Shkodër to protect Northern Albania. Thus, the Ottoman military personnel stationed in Macedonia, Kosovo, Albania and Epirus numbered almost 200,000 men, who were pitted against 234,000 Serbs, 48,000 Bulgarians and 115,000 Greeks.

=== Bulgaria ===
Bulgaria was militarily the most powerful of the four Balkan states, with a large, well-trained, well-equipped army. The Bulgarian Army had mobilized a total of 599,879 soldiers and non-commissioned officers and 6,757 officers. A shortage of 4,813 officers was filled by reserve and non-commissioned officers(non-commissioned officers amounted to 48,102 men) The Bulgarian field army counted for nine infantry divisions and one cavalry division. The artillery of the Bulgarian Army amounted to 1,103 guns with 835,435 shells in total. These guns were diverse in type and calibre, as well as being of Russian, German and French origin. Only half of them were modern quick-firing systems however and the others(older models) were worn out, had no recoil mechanisms and a lack of spare parts made their repair and maintenance difficult. The Macedonian and Thracian refugee communities developed a broad volunteer movement throughout Bulgaria. This led to the formation of the Macedonian-Adrianopolitan Volunteer Corps, with a strength of 14,670 men, under the command of Nikola Genev.

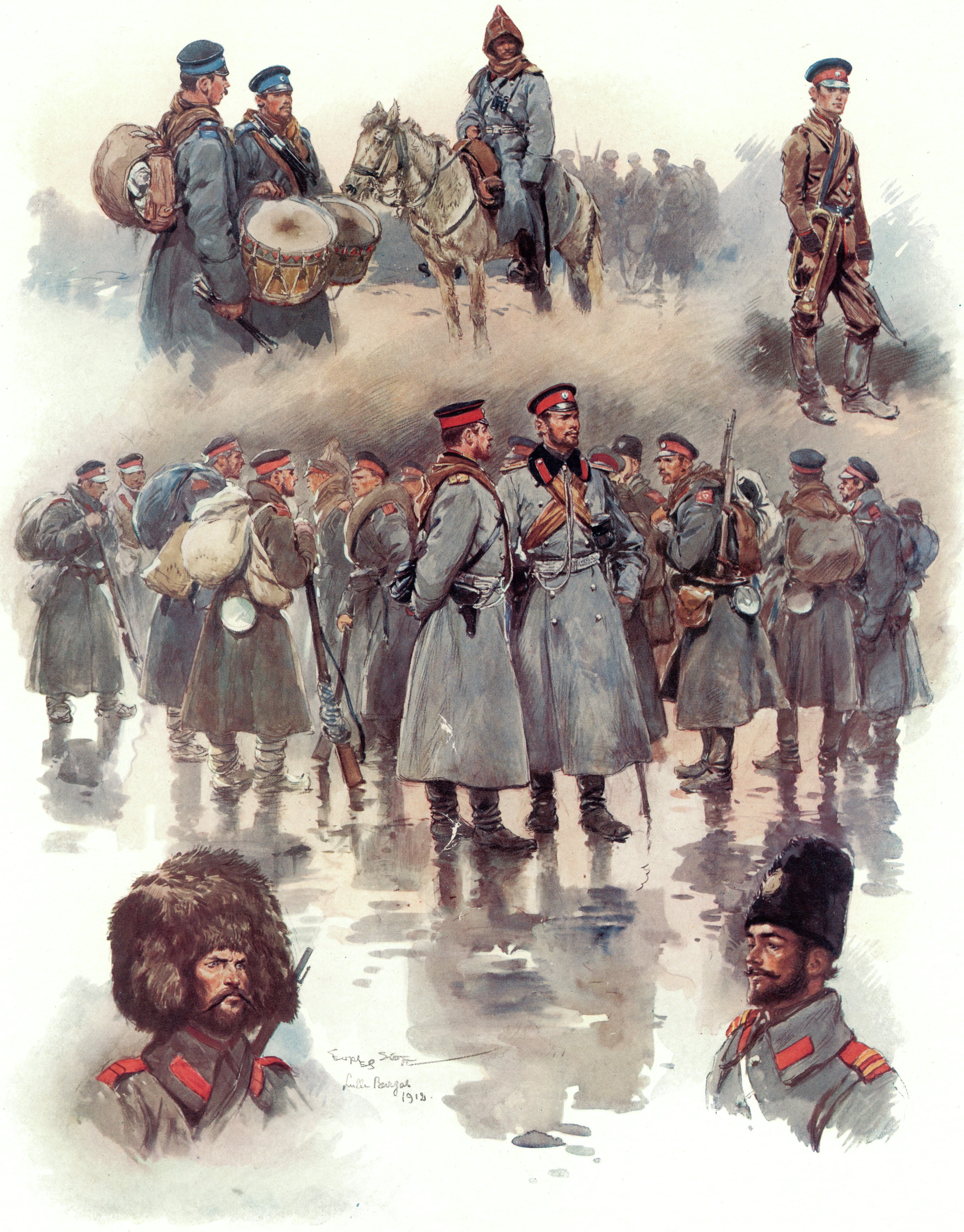
Bulgarian soldiers of the Balkan Wars

The High Command of the Bulgarian Army consisted of the Headquarters of the Active Army and the Main Directorate. Tsar Ferdinand I was the commander-in-chief, but did not actively command the army, and created the post of Assistant to the Commander-in-Chief, to which Lieutenant General Mihail Savov was appointed. Major General Ivan Fichev served as Chief of Staff. The Bulgarian navy and river fleets included six 98-ton torpedo boats and a training cruiser called “Nadezhda”. The protection of the Black Sea coast was the main purpose of the Bulgarian navy, as well as the prevention of an Ottoman blockade that might disrupt the important connection to Russia.

Bulgaria deployed its main force in Thrace by forming three armies. The First Army (79,370 men), under General Vasil Kutinchev, had three infantry divisions and was deployed to the south of Yambol and assigned operations along the Tundzha River. The Second Army (122,748 men), under General Nikola Ivanov, with two infantry divisions and one infantry brigade, was deployed west of the First Army and was assigned to capture the strong fortress of Adrianople (Edirne). Plans had the Third Army (94,884 men), under General Radko Dimitriev, to be deployed east of and behind the First Army and to be covered by the cavalry division that hid it from the Ottomans' sight. The Third Army had three infantry divisions and was assigned to cross Mount Stranja and to take the fortress of Kirk Kilisse (Kırklareli). The 2nd (49,180) and 7th (48,523 men) The divisions were assigned independent roles, operating in Western Thrace and Eastern Macedonia, respectively.

==== Armenian volunteers ====
Three hundred Armenians from throughout the Ottoman Empire, Europe, and Russia, a small yet significant number, volunteered to fight on the side of the Balkan League's soldiers of more than 850,000. Under the leadership of Andranik Ozanian and Garegin Nzhdeh, the Armenian detachment was commissioned to fight the Ottomans first at Momchilgrad and Komotini and its environs, and then later İpsala, Keşan, and Malkara, and Tekirdağ.

=== Serbia ===
Serbia called upon about 255,000 men, out of a population of 2,912,000, with about 228 heavy guns, grouped in ten infantry divisions, two independent brigades and a cavalry division, under the effective command of the former war minister, Radomir Putnik. The Serbian High Command, in its prewar war games, had concluded that the most likely site for the decisive battle against the Ottoman Vardar Army would be on the Ovče Pole Plateau, ahead of Skopje. Thus, the main forces were formed as three armies for the advance towards Skopje, and a division and an independent brigade were to cooperate with the Montenegrins in the Sanjak of Novi Pazar.

The First Army (132,000 men), the strongest, was commanded by Crown Prince Alexander, and the Chief of Staff was Colonel Petar Bojović. The First Army formed the centre of the drive towards Skopje. The Second Army (74,000 men) was commanded by General Stepa Stepanović and had one Serbian and one Bulgarian (7th Rila) division. It formed the army's left wing and advanced towards Stracin. Though the inclusion of a Bulgarian division was according to a prewar arrangement between Serbian and Bulgarian armies, it ceased to obey the orders of Stepanović as soon as the war began, only following those of the Bulgarian High Command. The Third Army (76,000 men) was commanded by General Božidar Janković, and since it was on the right wing, had the task to invade Kosovo and then move south to join the other armies in the expected battle at Ovče Polje. There were two more concentrations in northwestern Serbia across the borders between Serbia and Austria-Hungary: the Ibar Army (25,000 men), under General Mihailo Živković, and the Javor Brigade (12,000 men), under Lieutenant-Colonel Milovoje Anđelković.

=== Greece ===
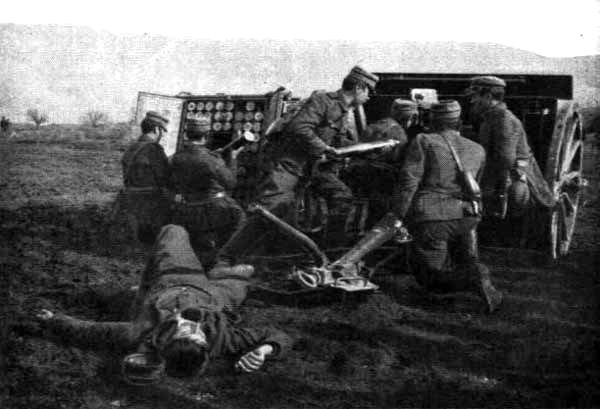
Greek artillerymen with 75 mm field gun

Greece, whose population was then 2,666,000, was considered the weakest of the three main allies since it fielded the smallest army and had suffered a defeat against the Ottomans 16 years earlier, in the Greco-Turkish War of 1897. A British consular dispatch from 1910 expressed the common perception of the Greek army's abilities: "If there is a war, we shall probably see that the only thing Greek officers can do besides talking is to run away." However, Greece was the only Balkan country to possess a meaningful navy, which was vital to the League to prevent Ottoman reinforcements from being rapidly transferred by ship from Asia to Europe. The Serbs and the Bulgarians readily appreciated it as the chief factor in initiating the process of Greece's inclusion in the League. As the Greek ambassador to Sofia put it during the negotiations that led to Greece's entry into the League, "Greece can provide 600,000 men for the war effort. With 200,000 men on the battlefield, the fleet will be able to prevent 400,000 men from being landed by Turkey between Salonica and Gallipoli."

The Greek army was still undergoing reorganization by a French military mission, which arrived in early 1911. Under French supervision, the Greeks had adopted the triangular infantry division as their primary formation though more importantly, the overhaul of the mobilization system allowed the country to field and equip a far greater number of troops than had been the case in 1897. Foreign observers estimated Greece would mobilize approximately 50,000 men, but the Greek army fielded 125,000, with another 140,000 in the National Guard and reserves. Upon mobilization, as in 1897, the force was grouped in two field armies, reflecting the geographic division between the two operational theatres that were open to the Greeks: Thessaly and Epirus. The Army of Thessaly (Στρατιά Θεσσαλίας) was placed under Crown Prince Constantine, with Lieutenant-General Panagiotis Danglis as his chief of staff. It fielded the bulk of the Greek forces: seven infantry divisions, a cavalry regiment, and four independent Evzones light mountain infantry battalions, roughly 100,000 men. It was expected to overcome the fortified Ottoman border positions and advance towards southern and central Macedonia, aiming to take Thessaloniki and Bitola. The remaining 10,000 to 13,000 men in eight battalions were assigned to the Army of Epirus (Greek: Στρατιά Ηπείρου) under Lieutenant-General Konstantinos Sapountzakis. As it had no hope of capturing Ioannina, the heavily fortified capital of Epirus, the initial mission was to pin down the Ottoman forces there until sufficient reinforcements could be sent from the Army of Thessaly after the successful conclusion of operations.

The armored cruiser Georgios Averof, flagship of the Greek fleet. She was the most modern warship involved in the conflict and played a crucial role in operations in the Aegean.

The Greek navy was relatively modern, strengthened by the recent purchase of numerous new units and undergoing reforms under the supervision of a British mission. Invited by Greek Prime Minister Venizelos in 1910, the mission began its work upon its arrival in May 1911. Granted extraordinary powers and led by Vice Admiral Lionel Grant Tufnell, it thoroughly reorganized the Navy Ministry and dramatically improved the number and the quality of exercises in gunnery and fleet maneuvers. In 1912, the core unit of the fleet was the fast armoured cruiser Georgios Averof, which had been completed in 1910 and then was the fastest and the most modern warship in the combatant navies. It was complemented by three rather-antiquated battleships of the Hydra class. There were also eight destroyers, built in 1906–1907, and six new destroyers, hastily bought in the summer of 1912 as the imminence of war became apparent.

Nevertheless, at the outbreak of the war, the Greek fleet was far from ready. The Ottoman battlefleet retained a clear advantage in the number of ships, speed of the primary surface units and, most importantly, the number and calibre of the ships' guns. In addition, as the war caught the fleet in the middle of its expansion and reorganization, a full third of the fleet (the six new destroyers and the submarine Delfin) reached Greece only after hostilities had started, forcing the navy to reshuffle crews, who consequently suffered from lacking familiarity and training. Coal stockpiles and other war stores were also in short supply, and the Georgios Averof had arrived with barely any ammunition and remained so until late November.

=== Montenegro ===
Montenegro was the smallest nation in the Balkan Peninsula, but in recent years before the war, it had improved its military skills with support from Russia. Also, it was the only Balkan country never to be fully conquered by the Ottoman Empire. As the smallest member of the League, Montenegro did not have much influence. However, it was advantageous for Montenegro, since when the Ottoman Empire was trying to counter the actions of Serbia, Bulgaria and Greece, there was enough time for Montenegro to prepare, which helped its successful military campaign.

=== Ottoman Empire ===
Known colloquially as "the sick man of Europe", by 1912, the Ottoman Empire was at the end stages of a centuries long decline. Upon the outbreak of war Turkish forces were extremely vulnerable. The Ottoman Empire itself possessed a far larger population than all of its adversaries combined, of around 26 million. However just over 6.1 million lived in what still remained of Ottoman Europe, of which only 2.3 million were Muslim. A majority of the remainder were Orthodox Christians, considered unfit for conscription. The poor transport network of the Empire's Asian regions dictated that the only reliable way to mass transfer troops to the front was by sea where they'd be vulnerable to attacks from the Greek fleet based in the Aegean. In addition, in 1912 Ottomans were still at war with the Italians who in the year proceeding had overrun Ottoman Libya and by now were invading the Dodecanese islands, a campaign which had dominated Ottoman military efforts. Though the Ottoman Empire and Italy made peace on 15 October 1912, only days after the outbreak of hostilities in the Balkans, the protracted war had prevented the Ottomans from reinforcing their position in the Balkans as their relations with the Balkan states deteriorated.

==== Forces in Balkans ====
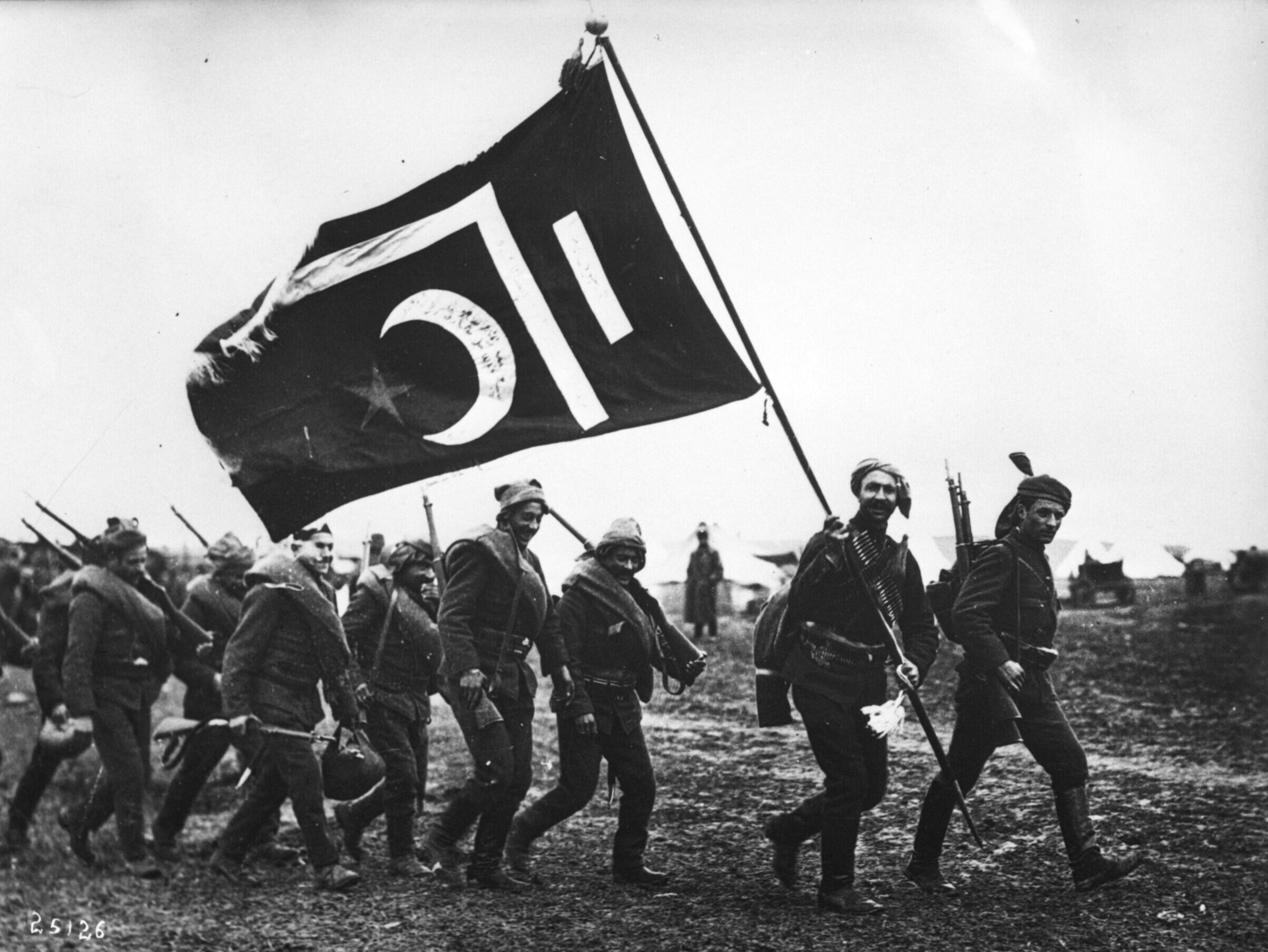
Ottoman troops during the Balkan Wars

The Ottomans' military capabilities were hampered by several factors, such as domestic strife caused by the Young Turk Revolution and the counterrevolutionary coup several months later. That resulted in different groups competing for influence within the military. A German mission had tried reorganizing the army, but its recommendations had not been fully implemented. The Ottoman army was caught in the middle of reform and reorganization. Also, several of the army's best battalions had been transferred to Yemen to face the ongoing rebellion. In the summer of 1912, the Ottoman High Command decided disastrously to dismiss some 70,000 mobilized troops. Though the regular army (Nizam) was well-equipped and had trained active divisions, the reserve units (Redif) that reinforced it was ill-equipped, especially in artillery, and badly-trained.

The Ottomans' strategic situation was difficult, as their borders were almost impossible to defend against a coordinated attack by the Balkan states. The Ottoman leadership decided to secure all of their territory. As a result, the available forces, which could not be effortlessly reinforced from Asia because of Greek control of the sea and the inadequacy of the Ottoman railway system, were dispersed too thinly across the region. They failed to stand up to the rapidly-mobilized Balkan armies. The Ottomans had three in Europe (the Macedonian, Vardar and Thracian Armies), with 1,203 pieces of mobile and 1,115 fixed artillery in fortified areas. The Ottoman High Command repeated its error of previous wars by ignoring the established command structure to create new superior commands, the Eastern Army and Western Army, reflecting the division of the operational theatre between the Thracian (against the Bulgarians) and Macedonian (against the Greeks, Serbs and Montenegrins) fronts.

The Western Army fielded at least 200,000 men, and the Eastern Army fielded 115,000 men against the Bulgarians. The Eastern Army was commanded by Nazim Pasha and had seven corps of 11 regular infantry divisions, 13 Redif divisions and at least one cavalry division:

- I Corps with three divisions (2nd Infantry (minus regiment), 3rd Infantry and 1st Provisional divisions).
- II Corps with three divisions (4th (minus regiment) and 5th Infantry and Uşak Redif divisions).
- III Corps with four divisions (7th, 8th and 9th Infantry Divisions, all minus a regiment, and the Afyonkarahisar Redif Division).
- IV Corps with three divisions (12th Infantry Division (minus regiment), İzmit and Bursa Redif divisions).
- XVII Corps with three divisions (Samsun, Ereğli and İzmir Redif divisions).
- Edirne Fortified Area with six-plus divisions (10th and 11th Infantry, Edirne, Babaeski and Gümülcine Redif and the Fortress division, 4th Rifle and 12th Cavalry regiments).
- Kırcaali Detachment with two-plus divisions (Kırcaali Redif, Kırcaali Mustahfız division and 36th Infantry Regiment).
- An independent cavalry division and the 5th Light Cavalry Brigade.

The Western Army (Macedonian and Vardar Army) constituted ten corps with 32 infantry and two cavalry divisions. Against Serbia, the Ottomans deployed the Vardar Army (HQ in Skopje) under Halepli Zeki Pasha, with five corps of 18 infantry divisions, one cavalry division and two independent cavalry brigades under the:

- V Corps with four divisions (13th, 15th, 16th Infantry and the İştip Redif divisions)
- VI Corps with four divisions (17th, 18th Infantry and the Manastır and Drama Redif divisions)
- VII Corps with three division (19th Infantry and Üsküp and Priştine Redif divisions)
- II Corps with three divisions (Uşak, Denizli and İzmir Redif divisions)
- Sandžak Corps with four divisions (20th Infantry (minus regiment), 60th Infantry, Metroviça Redif Division, Taşlıca Redif Regiment, Firzovik and Taslica detachments)
- An independent Cavalry Division and the 7th and 8th Cavalry Brigades.

The Macedonian Army (headquarters in Thessaloniki under Ali Rıza Pasha) had 14 divisions in five corps, deployed against Greece, Bulgaria and Montenegro.

Against Greece, at least seven divisions were deployed:

- VIII Provisional Corps with three divisions (22nd Infantry and Nasliç and Aydın Redif divisions).
- Yanya Corps with three divisions (23rd Infantry, Yanya Redif and Bizani Fortress divisions).
- Selanik Redif division and Karaburun Detachment as independent units.

Against Bulgaria, in southeastern Macedonia, two divisions, the Struma Corps (14th Infantry and Serez Redif divisions, plus the Nevrekop Detachment), were deployed.

Against Montenegro, four-plus divisions were deployed:

- İşkodra Corps with two-plus divisions (24th Infantry, Elbasan Redif, İşkodra Fortified Area)
- İpek Detachment with two divisions (21st Infantry and Prizren Redif divisions)

According to the organizational plan, though the men of the Western Group were to total 598,000, slow mobilization and the inefficiency of the rail system drastically reduced the number of men available. According to the Western Army Staff, when the war began, it had only 200,000 men available. Although more men would reach their units, war casualties prevented the Western Group from coming near its nominal strength. In wartime, the Ottomans had planned to bring more troops in from Syria, both Nizamiye and Redif. Greek naval supremacy prevented those reinforcements from arriving. Instead, those soldiers had to deploy via the land route, and most never made it to the Balkans.

The Ottoman General Staff, assisted by the German military mission, developed twelve war plans designed to counter various combinations of opponents. Work on Plan No. 5, which was against Bulgaria, Greece, Serbia and Montenegro, was very advanced and had been sent to the army staff for them to develop local plans.

==== Ottoman Navy ====
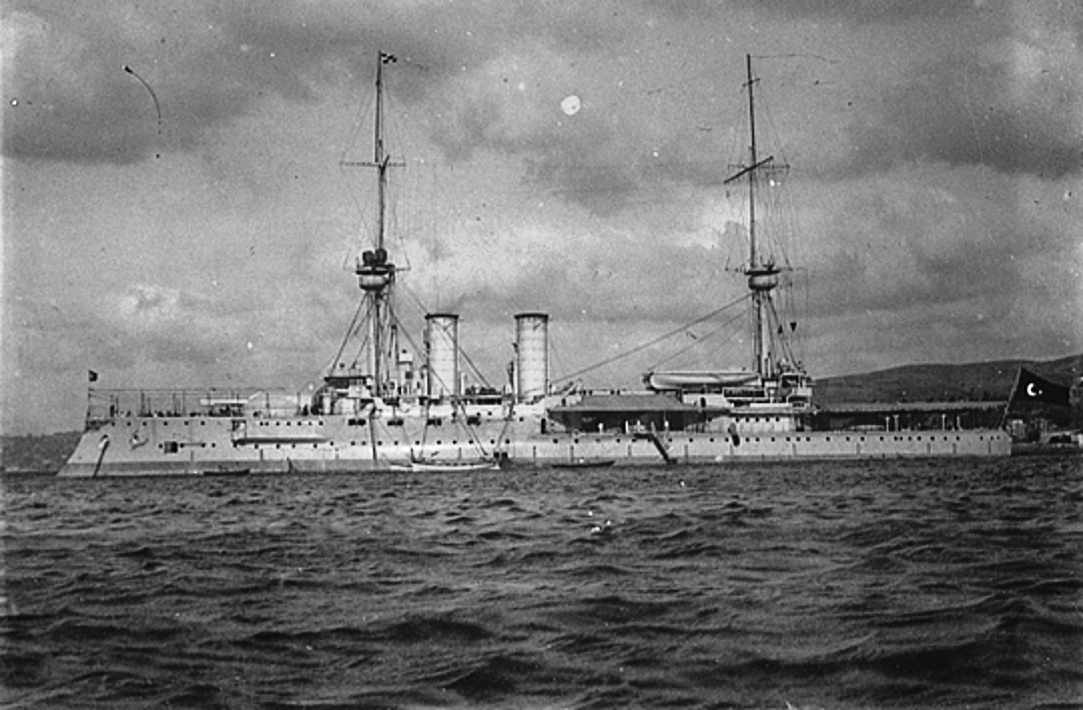
Ottoman flagship Barbaros Hayreddin (photo) and her sister Turgut Reis were more heavily armed and armoured than Georgios Averof, but five knots slower.

The Ottoman fleet had performed abysmally in the 1897 Greco-Turkish War, forcing the Ottoman government to begin a drastic overhaul. Older ships were retired, and newer ones were acquired, chiefly from France and Germany. In addition, in 1908, the Ottomans called in a British naval mission to update their training and doctrine. The British mission, headed by Admiral Sir Douglas Gamble, would find its task almost impossible. The political upheaval in the aftermath of the Young Turk Revolution prevented it to a large extent. Between 1908 and 1911, the office of the Navy Minister changed hands nine times. Interdepartmental infighting and the entrenched interests of the bloated and averaged officer corps, many of whom occupied their positions as quasi-sinecure, further obstructed drastic reform. In addition, the Ottoman ministers met the British attempts to control the navy's construction programme with suspicion. Consequently, funds for Gamble's ambitious plans for new ships were unavailable.

To counter the Greek acquisition of the Georgios Averof, the Ottomans initially tried to buy the new German armoured cruiser SMS Blücher or the battlecruiser SMS Moltke. Not able to afford the ships' high cost, the Ottomans acquired two old Brandenburg-class pre-dreadnought battleships, which became Barbaros Hayreddin and Turgut Reis. Along with the cruisers Hamidiye and Mecidiye, both ships were to form the relatively modern core of the Ottoman battlefleet. By the summer of 1912, however, they were already in poor condition because of chronic neglect: the rangefinders and ammunition hoists had been removed, the telephones were not working, the pumps were corroded, and most of the watertight doors could no longer be closed.

=== Albanian volunteers and irregulars in the Ottoman army ===
During the onset of the First Balkan War, most Albanians, including frequent rebels like Isa Boletin, united to defend the Ottoman Empire in order to safeguard their Albanian territories. Without a centralized national structure, Albanians were compelled to depend on Ottoman establishments, its military, and its administration to shield them from partition. However, all three proved inadequate against the onslaught of four invading Balkan armies. Even following the signing of the armistice in December 1912, Ottoman regular troops, along with Albanian irregular forces, persisted in central and southern Albania.

== Thracian theatre ==
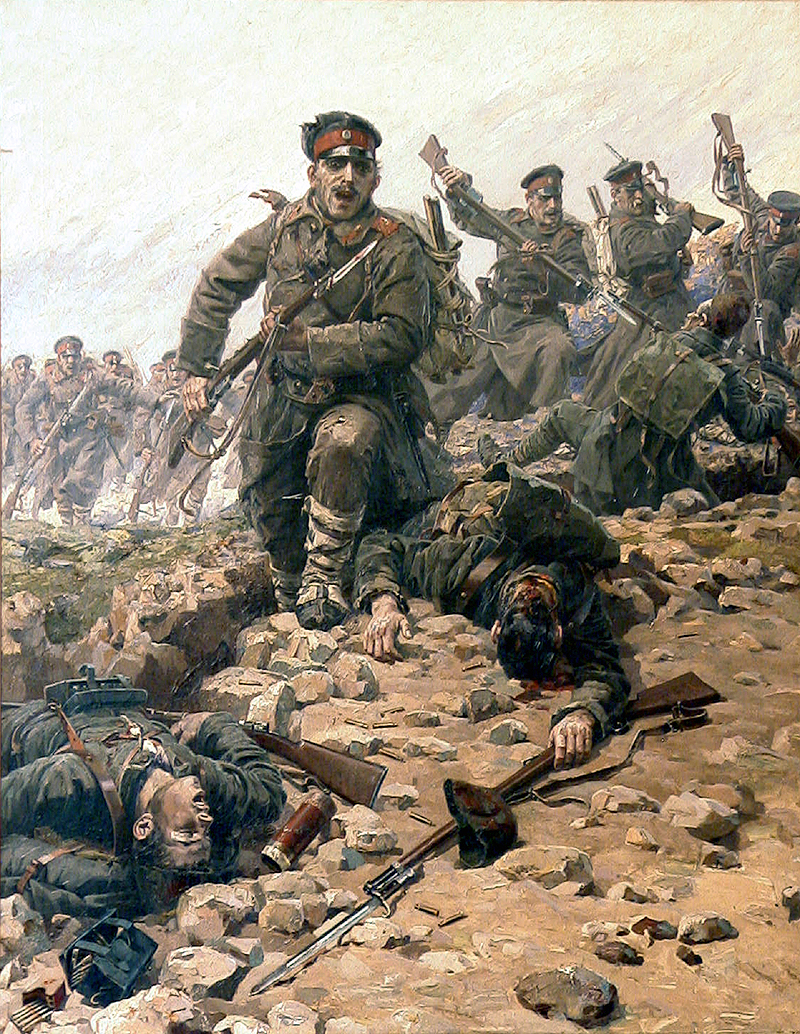
"Bulgarians overrun the Ottoman positions à la bayonette", by the Czech painter Jaroslav Věšín.

Montenegro started the First Balkan War by declaring war against the Ottomans on 8 October [O.S. 25 September] 1912. The western part of the Balkans, including Albania, Kosovo, and Macedonia, was less vital to the resolution of the war and the survival of the Ottoman Empire than the Thracian theatre, where the Bulgarians fought significant battles against the Ottomans. Although geography dictated Thrace would be the primary battlefield in a war with the Ottoman Empire, the position of the Ottoman Army there was jeopardized by erroneous intelligence estimates of the opponents' order of battle. Unaware of the secret prewar political and military settlement over Macedonia between Bulgaria and Serbia, the Ottoman leadership assigned the bulk of its forces there. The German ambassador, Hans Baron von Wangenheim, one of the most influential people in the Ottoman capital, had reported to Berlin on 21 October that the Ottoman forces believed that the bulk of the Bulgarian army would be deployed in Macedonia with the Serbs. Then, the Ottoman headquarters, under Abdullah Pasha, expected to meet only three Bulgarian infantry divisions, accompanied by cavalry, east of Adrianople. According to historian E. J. Erickson, though that assumption possibly resulted from the analysis of the objectives of the Balkan Pact, it had deadly consequences for the Ottoman Army in Thrace, which was now required to defend the area from the bulk of the Bulgarian army against impossible odds. The misappraisal was also the reason for the catastrophic aggressive Ottoman strategy at the start of the campaign in Thrace.

=== Bulgarian offensive and advance to Çatalca ===
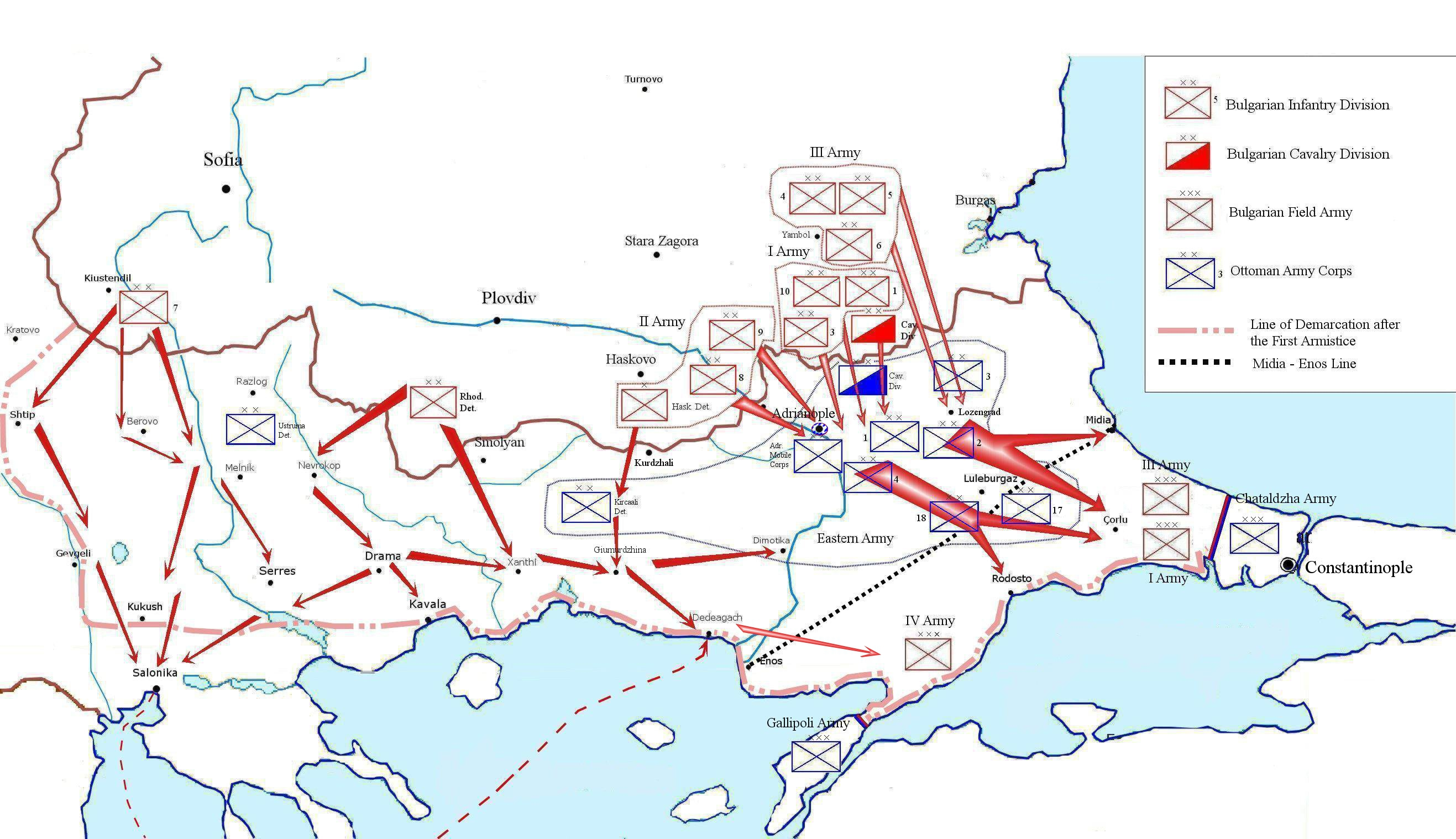
Bulgarian military operations during the First Balkan War

On the Thracian Front, the Bulgarian army had placed 346,182 men against the Ottoman First Army, with 105,000 men in eastern Thrace and the Kircaali detachment, of 24,000 men, in western Thrace. The Bulgarian forces were divided into the First, Second and Third Bulgarian Armies of 297,002 men in the eastern part and 49,180 (33,180 regulars and 16,000 irregulars) under the 2nd Bulgarian Division (General Stilian Kovachev) in the western part. The first large-scale battle occurred against the Edirne-Kırklareli defensive line, where the Bulgarian First and Third Armies (a combined 174,254 men) defeated the Ottoman East Army (of 96,273 combatants), near Gechkenli, Seliolu and Petra. The Ottoman XV Corps urgently left the area to defend the Gallipoli Peninsula against an expected Greek amphibious assault, which never materialized. The absence of the corps created an immediate vacuum between Adrianople and Demotika, and the 11th Infantry Division from the Eastern Army's IV Corps was moved there to replace it. Thus, one complete army corps was removed from the Eastern Army's order of battle.

As a consequence of the insufficient intelligence of the invading forces, the Ottoman offensive plan failed in the face of Bulgarian superiority. That forced Kölemen Abdullah Pasha to abandon Kirk Kilisse, which was taken without resistance by the Bulgarian Third Army. The fortress of Adrianople, with some 61,250 men, was isolated and besieged by the Bulgarian Second Army, but for the time being, no assault was possible because of the lack of siege equipment in the Bulgarian inventory. Another consequence of Greek naval supremacy in the Aegean was that the Ottoman forces did not receive the reinforcements that had been in the war plans, which would have been further corps transferred by sea from Syria and Palestine. Thus, the Greek navy played an indirect but crucial role in the Thracian campaign by neutralizing three corps, a significant portion of the Ottoman army, in the all-important opening round of the war. Another more direct role was the emergency transportation of the Bulgarian 7th Rila Division from the Macedonian Front to the Thracian Front after the end of operations there.

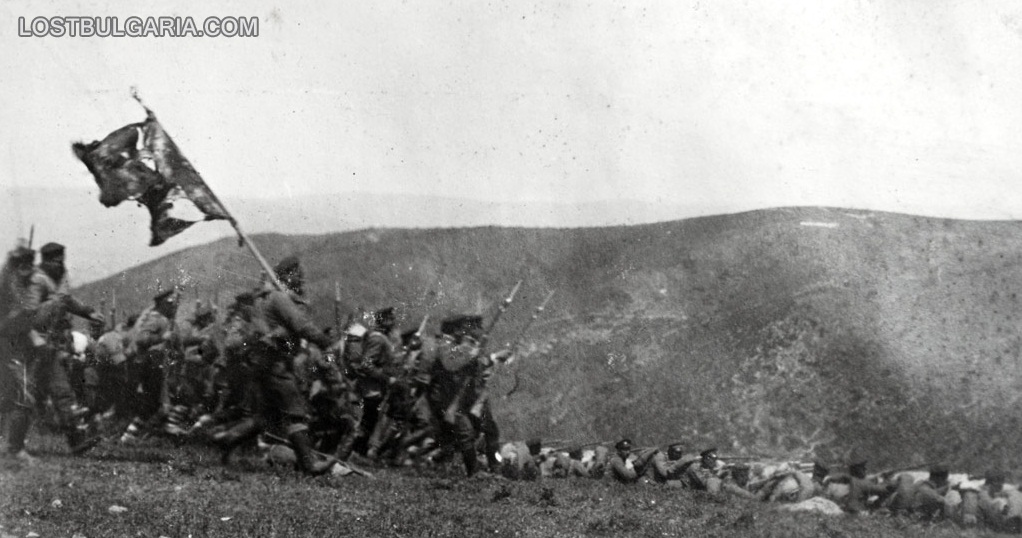
Bulgarian bayonet charge at Lule Burgas

After the Battle of Kirk Kilisse, the Bulgarian High Command decided to wait a few days, but that allowed the Ottoman forces to occupy a new defensive position on the Lüleburgaz-Karaağaç-Pınarhisar line. However, the Bulgarian attack by the First and Third Armies, which together accounted for 107,386 riflemen, 3,115 cavalries, 116 machine guns and 360 artillery pieces, defeated the reinforced Ottoman Army, with 126,000 riflemen, 3,500 cavalries, 96 machine guns, and 342 artillery pieces and reached the Sea of Marmara. In terms of forces engaged, it was the largest battle fought in Europe between the end of the Franco-Prussian War and the beginning of the First World War. As a result, the Ottoman forces were pushed to their final defensive position across the Çatalca Line, protecting the peninsula and Constantinople. There, they managed to stabilize the front with the help of fresh reinforcements from Asia. The line had been constructed during the Russo-Turkish War of 1877-8, under the directions of a German engineer in Ottoman service, von Bluhm Pasha, but it had been considered obsolete by 1912. An epidemic of cholera spread among the Bulgarian soldiers after the Battle of Luleburgas - Bunarhisar.

Meanwhile, the Bulgarian 2nd Thracian division's forces, 49,180 men divided into the Haskovo and Rhodope detachments, advanced towards the Aegean Sea. The Ottoman Kircaali detachment (Kircaali Redif and Kircaali Mustahfiz Divisions and 36th Regiment, with 24,000 men), tasked with defending a 400 km front across the Thessaloniki-Alexandroupoli railroad, failed to offer serious resistance and the commander, Yaver Pasha, was captured with 10,131 officers and men by the Macedonian-Adrianopolitan Volunteer Corps on 26 November. After the occupation of Thessaloniki by the Greek army, his surrender completed the isolation of the Ottoman forces in Macedonia from those in Thrace.

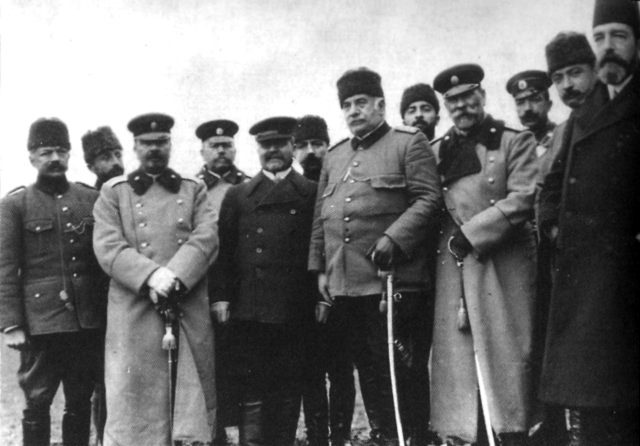
Çatalca armistice delegates; General Ivan Fichev, Nazim Pasha and General Mihail Savov are in the first row.

On 17 November [O.S. 4 November] 1912, the offensive against the Çatalca Line began, despite clear warnings that Russia would attack the Bulgarians if they occupied Constantinople. The Bulgarians launched their attack along the defensive line, with 176,351 men and 462 artillery pieces against the Ottomans' 140,571 men and 316 artillery pieces, but despite Bulgarian superiority, the Ottomans succeeded in repulsing them. The Ottomans and Bulgaria agreed to negotiate on 3 December [O.S. 20 November] 1912, the latter representing Serbia and Montenegro, and peace negotiations began in London. Greece also participated in the conference but refused to agree to a truce and continued its operations in the Epirus sector. They were interrupted on 23 January [O.S. 10 January] 1913, when a Young Turk coup d'état in Constantinople, under Enver Pasha, overthrew the government of Kâmil Pasha. Upon the expiration of the agreement, on 3 February [O.S. 21 January] 1913, hostilities restarted.

=== Ottoman counteroffensive ===
On 20 February, Ottoman forces attacked Gallipoli in Çatalca and its south. There, the Ottoman X Corps, with 19,858 men and 48 guns, landed at Şarköy while an attack of around 15,000 men supported by 36 guns (part of the 30,000-strong Ottoman army isolated in Gallipoli Peninsula) at Bulair, farther south. Both attacks were supported by fire from Ottoman warships and had been intended, in the long term, to relieve pressure on Edirne. Confronting them were about 10,000 men with 78 guns. The Ottomans were probably unaware of the presence in the area of the new 4th Bulgarian Army, of 92,289 men, under General Stiliyan Kovachev. Thick fog, intense Bulgarian artillery, and machine gunfire hampered the Ottoman attack in the thin isthmus, with a front of just 1800m. As a result, the attack stalled and was repulsed by a Bulgarian counterattack. By the end of the day, both armies had returned to their original positions. Meanwhile, the Ottoman X Corps, which had landed at Şarköy, advanced until 23 February [O.S. 10 February] 1913, when the reinforcements sent by General Kovachev succeeded in halting them.

Casualties on both sides were light. After the frontal attack in Bulair's failure, the Ottoman forces at Şarköy re-entered their ships on 24 February [O.S. 11 February] and were transported to Gallipoli.

The Ottoman attack at Çatalca, directed against the powerful Bulgarian First and Third Armies, was initially launched only as a diversion from the Gallipoli-Şarköy operation to pin down the Bulgarian forces in situ. Nevertheless, it resulted in unexpected success. The Bulgarians, who were weakened by cholera and concerned that an Ottoman amphibious invasion might endanger their armies, deliberately withdrew about 15 km and to the south over 20 km to their secondary defensive positions, on higher ground to the west. With the end of the attack in Gallipoli, though the Ottomans cancelled the operation since they were reluctant to leave the Çatalca Line, several days passed before the Bulgarians realized that the offensive had ended. By 15 February, the front had again stabilized, but fighting along the static lines continued. The battle, which resulted in heavy Bulgarian casualties, could be characterized as an Ottoman tactical victory but a strategic defeat since it did nothing to prevent the failure of the Gallipoli-Şarköy operation or to relieve the pressure on Edirne.

=== Fall of Adrianople and Serbo-Bulgarian friction ===
The failure of the Şarköy-Bulair operation and the deployment of the Second Serbian Army, with its much-needed heavy siege artillery, sealed Adrianople's fate. On 11 March, after a two weeks bombardment, which destroyed many fortified structures around the city, the final assault started, with League forces enjoying a crushing superiority over the Ottoman garrison. The Bulgarian Second Army, with 106,425 men and two Serbian divisions, with 47,275 men, conquered the city, with the Bulgarians suffering 8,093 and the Serbs 1,462 casualties. The Ottoman casualties for the entire Adrianople campaign reached 23,000 dead. The number of prisoners is less clear. The Ottoman Empire began the war with 61,250 men in the fortress. Richard Hall noted that 60,000 men were captured. Adding to the 33,000 killed, the modern "Turkish General Staff History" notes that 28,500-man survived captivity leaving 10,000 men unaccounted for as possibly captured (including the unspecified number of wounded). Bulgarian losses for the entire Adrianople campaign amounted to 7,682. That was the last and decisive battle that was necessary for a quick end to the war even though it is speculated that the fortress would have fallen eventually because of starvation. The most important result was that the Ottoman command had lost all hope of regaining the initiative, which made any more fighting pointless.

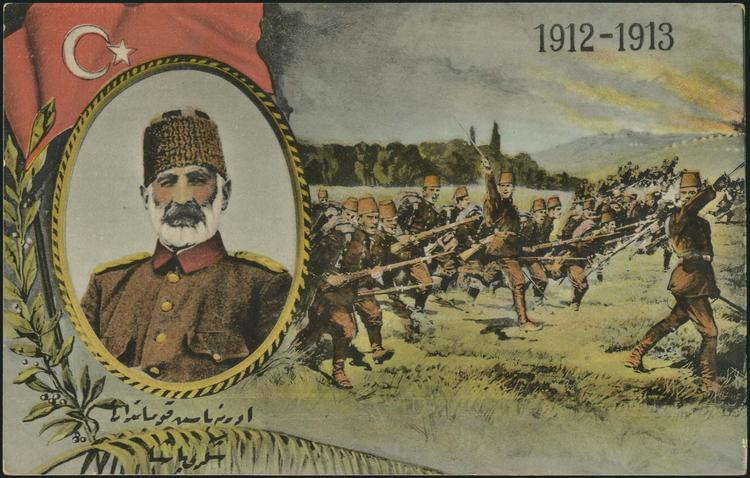
Ottoman postcard celebrating the defender of Adrianople, Mehmed Şükrü Pasha

The battle had significant results in Serbian-Bulgarian relations, planting the seeds of the two countries' confrontation some months later. The Bulgarian censor rigorously cut any references to Serbian participation in the operation in the telegrams of foreign correspondents. Public opinion in Sofia thus failed to realize the vital services of Serbia in the battle. Accordingly, the Serbs claimed that their troops of the 20th Regiment captured the Ottoman commander of the city and that Colonel Gavrilović was the allied commander who had accepted Shukri's official surrender of the garrison, a statement that the Bulgarians disputed. The Serbs officially protested and pointed out that although they had sent their troops to Adrianople to win for Bulgaria's territory, whose acquisition had never been foreseen by their mutual treaty, the Bulgarians had never fulfilled the clause of the treaty for Bulgaria to send 100,000 men to help the Serbians on their Vardar Front. The Bulgarians answered that their staff had informed the Serbs on 23 August. The friction escalated some weeks later when the Bulgarian delegates in London bluntly warned the Serbs that they must not expect Bulgarian support for their Adriatic claims. The Serbs angrily replied that it was a blatant withdrawal from the prewar agreement of mutual understanding, according to the Kriva Palanka-Adriatic line of expansion. The Bulgarians insisted that the Vardar Macedonian part of the agreement remained active, and the Serbs were still obliged to surrender the area, as had been agreed. The Serbs answered by accusing the Bulgarians of maximalism and pointed out that if they lost both northern Albania and Vardar Macedonia, their participation in the common war would have been virtually for nothing. The tension soon was expressed in a series of hostile incidents between both armies on their mutual line of occupation across the Vardar valley. The developments essentially ended the Serbian-Bulgarian alliance, making a future war between the two countries inevitable.

== Macedonian theatre ==
=== Greek operations ===
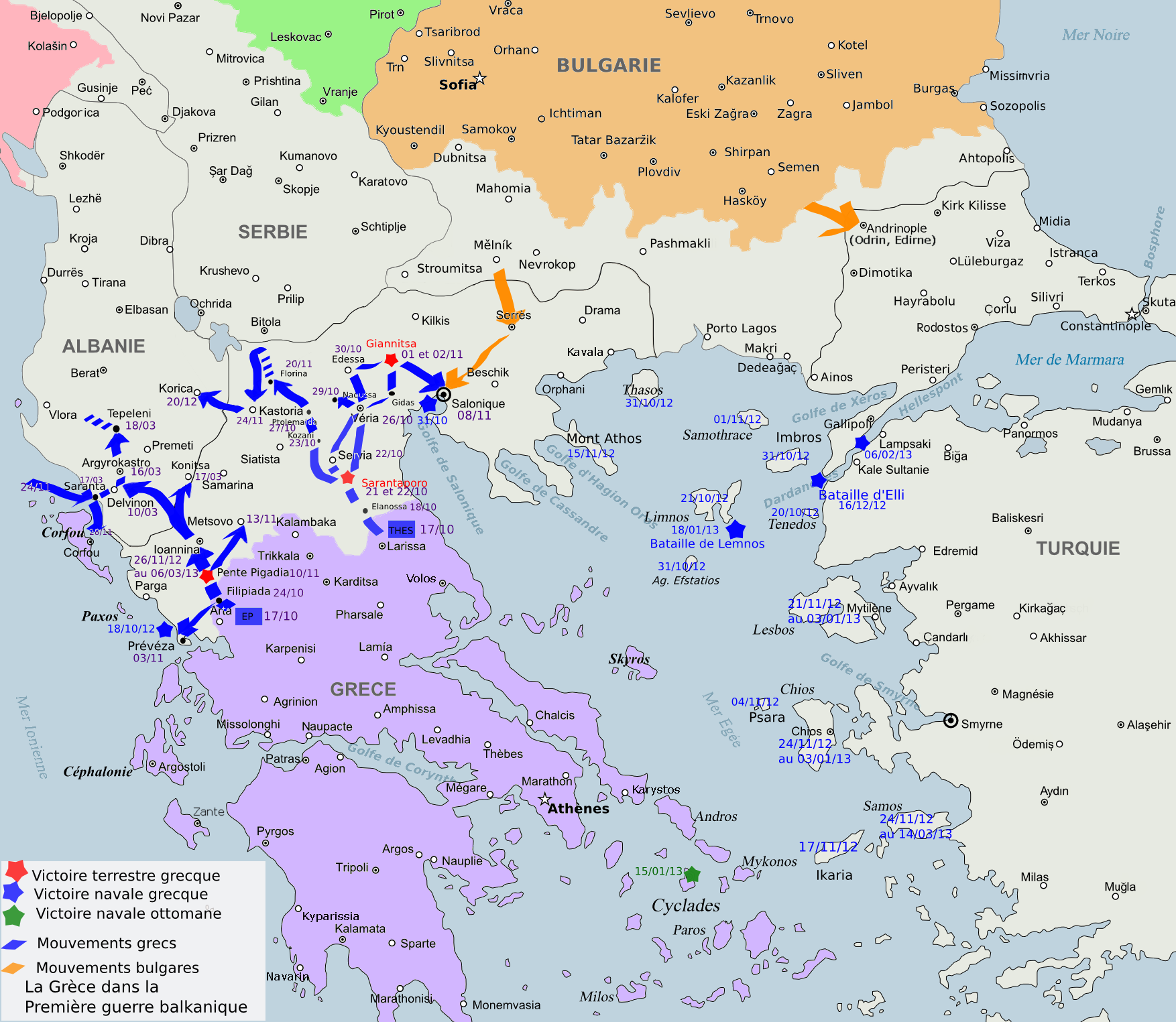
Greek operations during the First Balkan War (borders depicted are from after the Second Balkan War)

Ottoman intelligence had also disastrously misread Greek military intentions. In retrospect, the Ottoman staff seemingly believed that the Greek attack would be shared equally between Macedonia and Epirus. That made the Second Army staff evenly balance the combat strength of the seven Ottoman divisions between the Yanya Corps and VIII Corps in Epirus and southern Macedonia, respectively. Though the Greek army also fielded seven divisions, it had the initiative, so it concentrated all seven against VIII Corps, leaving only several independent battalions of scarcely divisional strength on the Epirus front. That had fatal consequences for the Western Group by leading to the early loss of the city at the strategic centre of all three Macedonian fronts (Thessaloniki), sealing their fate. In an unexpectedly brilliant and rapid campaign, the Army of Thessaly seized the city. In the absence of secure sea lines of communications, retaining the Thessaloniki-Constantinople corridor was essential to the overall strategic posture of the Ottomans in the Balkans. Once that was gone, the defeat of the Ottoman army became inevitable, in which the Bulgarians and the Serbs also played a vital role. Their great victories at Kirkkilise, Lüleburgaz, Kumanovo, and Monastir (Bitola) shattered the Eastern and Vardar Armies. However, they were not decisive in ending the war. The Ottoman field armies survived, and in Thrace, they grew stronger every day. Strategically, those victories were enabled partially by the weakened condition of the Ottoman armies, which had occurred by the active presence of the Greek army and navy.

With the declaration of war, the Greek Army of Thessaly, under Crown Prince Constantine, advanced to the north and overcame Ottoman opposition in the fortified mountain passes of Sarantaporo. After another victory at Giannitsa (Yenidje), on 2 November [O.S. 20 October] 1912, the Ottoman commander, Hasan Tahsin Pasha, surrendered Thessaloniki and its garrison of 26,000 men to the Greeks on 9 November [O.S. 27 October] 1912. Two Corps headquarters (Ustruma and VIII), two Nizamiye divisions (14th and 22nd) and four Redif divisions (Salonika, Drama, Naslic and Serez) were thus lost to the Ottoman order of battle. Also, the Ottoman forces lost 70 artillery pieces, 30 machine guns and 70,000 rifles (Thessaloniki was the central arms depot for the Western Armies). The Ottoman forces estimated that 15,000 officers and men had been killed during the campaign in southern Macedonia, bringing their total losses to 41,000 soldiers. Another consequence was that the destruction of the Macedonian army sealed the fate of the Ottoman Vardar Army, which was fighting the Serbs to the north. The fall of Thessaloniki left it strategically isolated, without logistical supply and depth to maneuver, and ensured its destruction.

Upon learning of the outcome of the Battle of Giannitsa (Yenidje), the Bulgarian High Command urgently dispatched the 7th Rila Division from the north towards the city. The division arrived there a day later, after surrendering to the Greeks the day before, who were further away from the city than the Bulgarians. Until 10 November, the Greek-occupied zone had been expanded to the line from Lake Dojran to the Pangaion hills west to Kavalla. In western Macedonia, however, the lack of coordination between the Greek and the Serbian headquarters cost the Greeks a setback in the Battle of Vevi, on 15 November [O.S. 2 November] 1912, when the Greek 5th Infantry Division crossed its way with the VI Ottoman Corps (part of the Vardar Army with the 16th, 17th and 18th Nizamiye Divisions), retreating to Albania after the Battle of Prilep against the Serbs. The Greek division, surprised by the presence of the Ottoman Corps, isolated from the rest of the Greek army and outnumbered by the now-counterattacking Ottomans centred on Monastir (Bitola), was forced to retreat. As a result, the Serbs beat the Greeks to Bitola.

=== Bulgarian operations ===
While the Thracian front was decisive for the Bulgarian war effort, the Macedonian theatre was designated secondary, although from a political standpoint it was the main objective of the Bulgarians during the war. The 7th Rila Division advanced along the Struma valley, some 200 km from Thessaloniki. The first significant disagreement between the Balkan League commands came when Serbian General Stepa Stepanović, commander of the Second Allied Army, did not approve the division's request for independent operations along the Struma valley. Regardless of this disapproval, the 7th Rila Division, under direct orders from the Bulgarian High Command, marched off. Between 24 and 27 October, Bulgarian forces entered Kočani, the Kresna Gorge and Štip, but false reports of Ottoman movements around Kočani on 31 October cost the Bulgarians three days, as they wanted to take Thessaloniki before the Greeks. After the Greek victory at the Battle of Yenidje and the capture of Demir Hisar, General Savov urged General Todorov to push towards Thessaloniki with the 7th Rila Division as fast as possible. By 7 November, Bulgarian forces in Southern Macedonia numbered some 70,000 men but were increasingly tired from constant marches, fighting around Drama and poor weather conditions. The Bulgarians also cut the communication line between Constantinople and the Ottoman Southern Corps group, while four IMRO detachments threatened its rear.

Bulgarian and Greek cavalry forces met near the village of Postol. Upon learning of the negotiations for the surrender of Thessaloniki, General Todorov ordered his men to march towards the city without stopping. At Güvezna, Todorov told the commander of the Greek cavalry brigade that he intended to attack and enter Thessaloniki. The Bulgarian advance compelled Tahsin Pasha to continue negotiations with Prince Constantine, and the capitulation protocol was signed on 9 November. That evening, two Ottoman officers informed the Bulgarians that the garrison had capitulated, while Tahsin Pasha refused General Racho Petrov's request to sign an additional surrender to the Bulgarians. The Greek 1st Division entered Thessaloniki at 10:30 on 10 November, while later that evening a Bulgarian brigade also entered the city. The entry of Bulgarian and Greek troops into Thessaloniki caused the first serious strain in Bulgarian-Greek relations. Military necessity soon required the withdrawal of the 7th Rila and 2nd Thracian Divisions toward the Gallipoli Peninsula, making it easier for the Greeks to establish themselves in Thessaloniki and gradually occupy the lands north and east of it, despite those areas already being under Bulgarian occupation.

=== Serbian operations ===
The Serbian forces operated against the primary part of the Ottoman Western Army in Novi Pazar, Kosovo and northern and eastern Macedonia. Strategically, they were divided into four independent armies and groups operating against the Ottomans: the Javor brigade and the Ibar Army in Novi Pazar; the Third Army in Kosovo; the First Army in northern Macedonia; and the Second Army from Bulgaria in eastern Macedonia. The decisive battle was expected to be fought in north Macedonia, in the plains of Ovče Pole, where the Ottoman Vardar Army's main forces were expected to concentrate.

The plan of the Serbian Supreme Command had three Serbian armies encircle and destroy the Vardar Army in that area, with the First Army advancing from the north (along the line of Vranje-Kumanovo-Ovče Pole), the Second Army from the east (along the line of Kriva Palanka-Kratovo-Ovče Pole) and the Third Army from the northwest (along the line of Priština-Skopje-Ovče Pole). The prime role was given to the First Army. The Second Army was expected to cut off the Vardar Army's retreat and, if necessary, to attack its rear and right flank. The Third Army was to take Kosovo and, if necessary, to assist the First Army by attacking the Vardar Army's left and rear. The Ibar Army and the Javor brigade had minor roles in the plan and were expected to secure the Sanjak of Novi Pazar and replace the Third Army in Kosovo after it had advanced south.

The Serbian army, under General (later Marshal) Putnik, achieved three decisive victories in Vardar Macedonia, the primary Serbian objective in the war, by effectively destroying the Ottoman forces in the region and conquering northern Macedonia. The Serbs also helped the Montenegrins take the Sandžak and sent two divisions to aid the Bulgarians at the siege of Edirne. The last battle for Macedonia was the Battle of Monastir, in which the remains of the Ottoman Vardar Army were forced to retreat to central Albania. After the battle, Serbian Prime Minister Pasic asked General Putnik to take part in the race for Thessaloniki. Putnik declined and turned his army to the west, towards Albania, since he saw that a war between Greece and Bulgaria over Thessaloniki could greatly help Serbia's plans for Vardar Macedonia.

== Kosovo–Epirus theatre ==
=== Serbian and Montenegrin operations ===
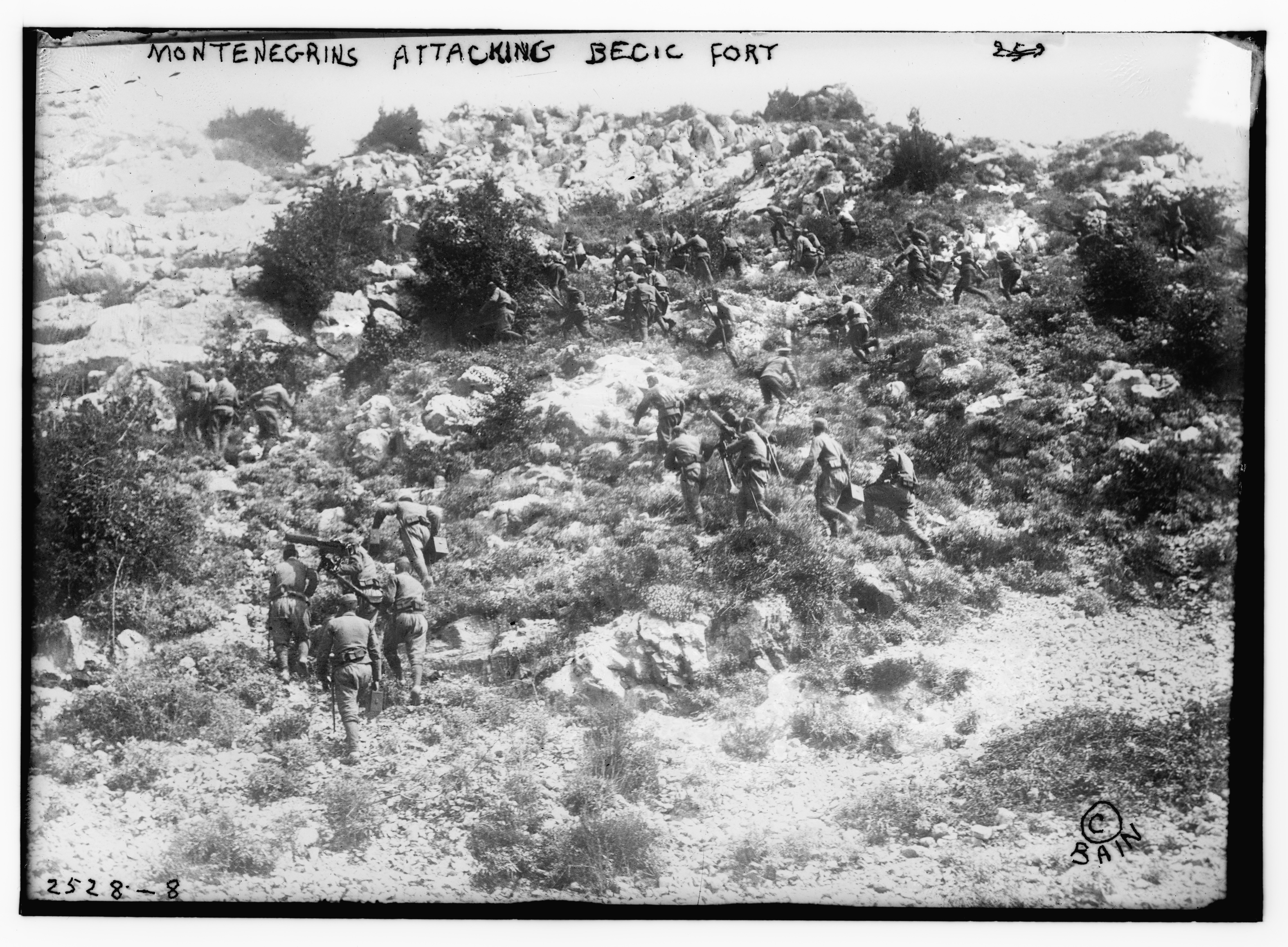
Montenegrins attacking Dečić Fortress

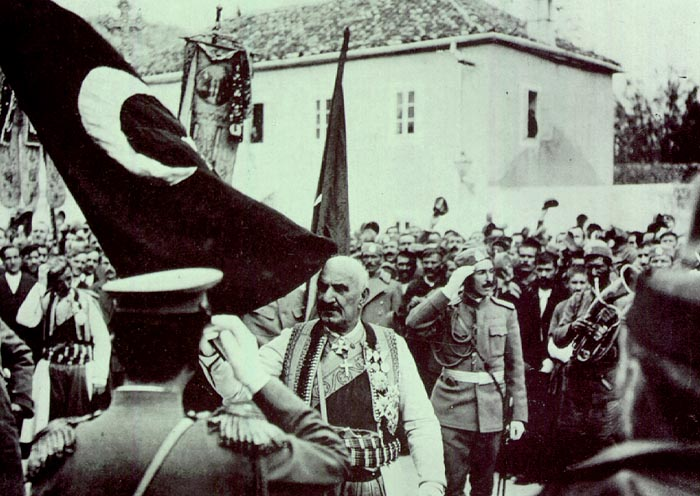
Ottoman flag being surrendered to King Nicholas I of Montenegro

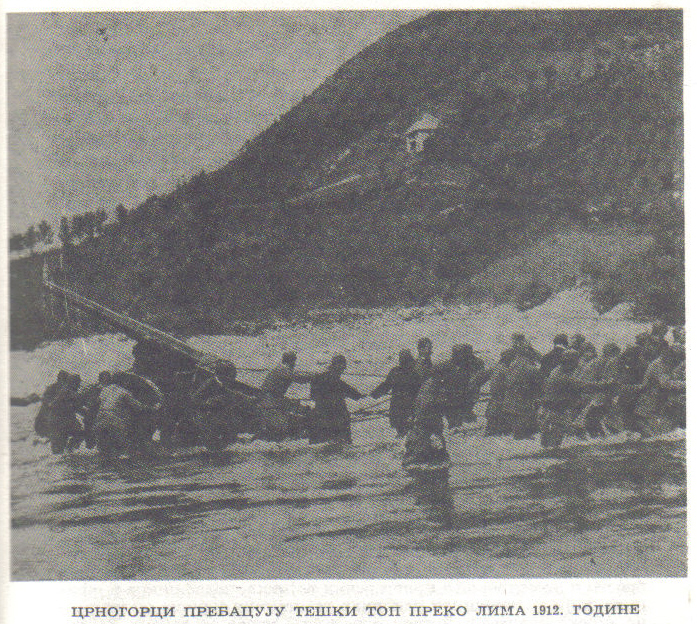
Montenegrin artillery crossing the Lim River during the attack on Berane

After pressure from the Great Powers, the Serbs started withdrawing from northern Albania and the Sandžak, yet left behind their heavy artillery park to help the Montenegrins in the continuing Siege of Shkodër. On 23 April 1913, Shkodër's garrison was forced to surrender because of starvation.

=== Epirus front ===
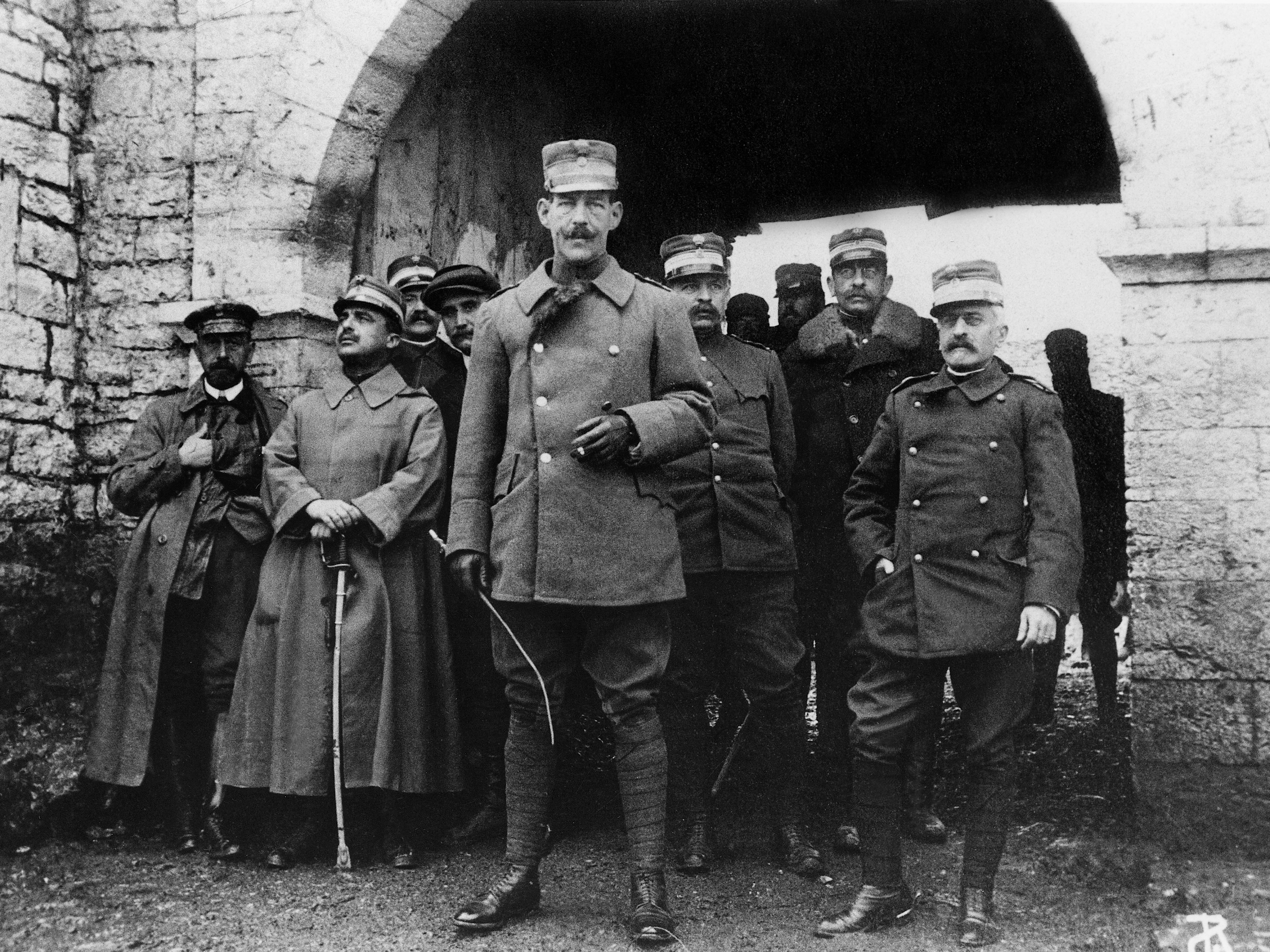
Constantine with his staff, at the main war base at Emin Aga Inn, Epirus, before the siege of Ioannina.

In the Epirus front, the Greek army, despite the fact that it was heavily outnumbered, was initially victorious conquering easily the small town of Philippiada on 30 September [O.S. 12 October] 1912, and the major port of Epirus, Preveza, after the battle of Nicopolis, on 8 October [O.S. 21 October] 1912, and thus pushed north towards Ioannina. On 5 November, Major Spyros Spyromilios led a revolt in the coastal area of Himarë and expelled the Ottoman garrison without any significant resistance, and on 20 November, Greek troops from western Macedonia entered Korçë. However, Greek forces in the Epirote front lacked the numbers to initiate an offensive against the German-designed defensive positions of Bizani, which protected Ioannina and needed to wait for reinforcements from the Macedonian front.

After the campaign in Macedonia was over, a large part of the Army was redeployed to Epirus, where Constantine assumed command. In the Battle of Bizani, the Ottoman positions were breached, and Ioannina was taken on 6 March [O.S. 21 February] 1913. During the siege, on 8 February 1913, the Russian pilot N. de Sackoff, flying for the Greeks, became the first pilot ever shot down in combat when his biplane was hit by ground fire after a bomb ran on the walls of Fort Bizani. He came down near the town of Preveza, on the coast north of the Ionian island of Lefkas, secured local Greek assistance, repaired his plane and resumed flying back to base. The fall of Ioannina allowed the Greek army to continue its advance into northern Epirus, now the south of Albania, which it occupied. There they halted, but the Serbian control was very close to the north.

== Naval operations ==
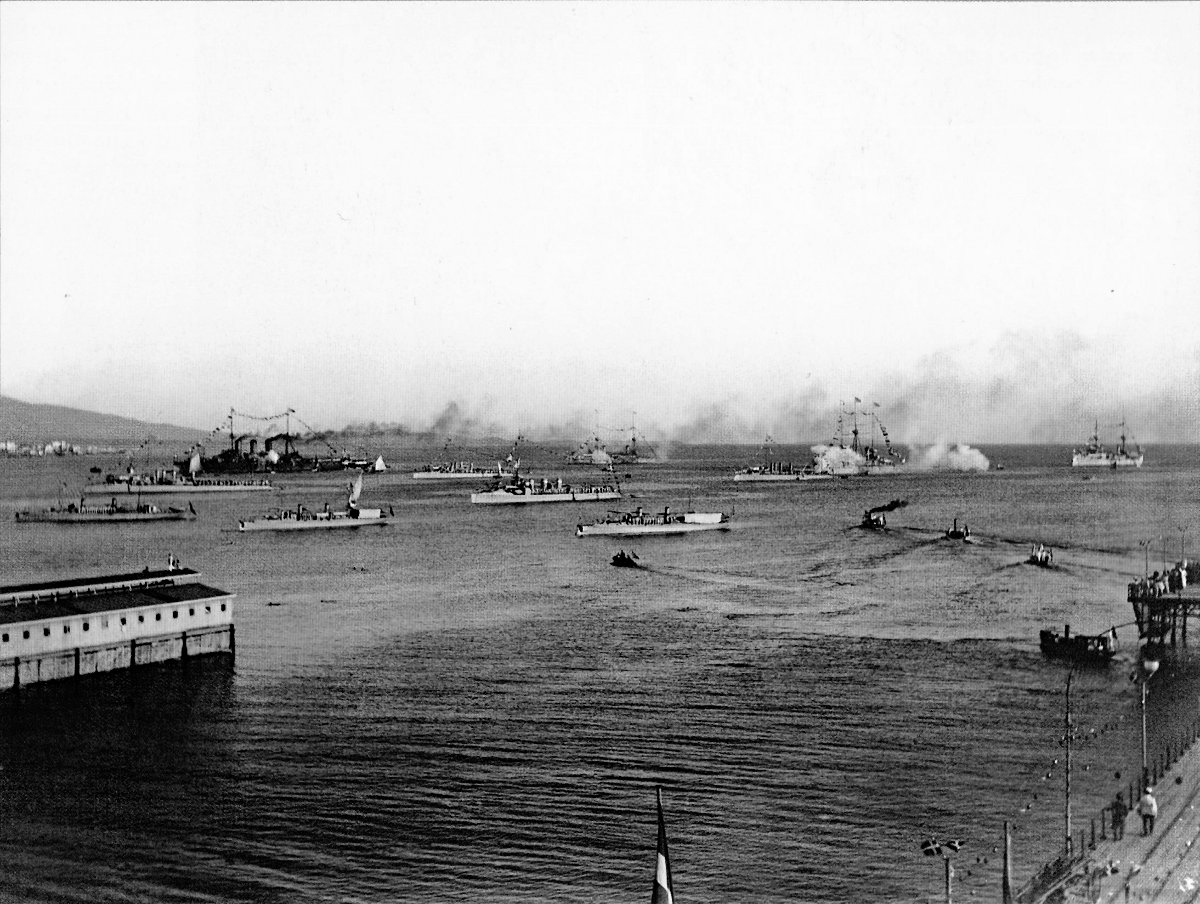
The Greek fleet assembled at Phaleron Bay on 5/18 October 1912 before it sailed for Lemnos.

On the outbreak of hostilities on 18 October, the Greek fleet, placed under the newly promoted Rear Admiral Pavlos Kountouriotis, sailed for the island of Lemnos, occupying it three days later (although fighting continued on the island until 27 October) and establishing an anchorage at Moudros Bay. That move had significant strategic importance by providing the Greeks with a forward base near the Dardanelles Straits, the Ottoman fleet's main anchorage and refuge. The Ottoman fleet's superiority in speed and broadside weight made Greek plans expect it to sortie from the straits early in the war. The Greek fleet's unpreparedness because of the early outbreak of the war might as well have let such an early Ottoman attack achieve a crucial victory. Instead, the Ottoman navy spent the first two months of the war in operations against the Bulgarians in the Black Sea, which gave the Greeks valuable time to complete their preparations and allowed them to consolidate their control of the Aegean Sea.

=== Establishment of Greek control of the Aegean ===
Lieutenant Nikolaos Votsis scored a significant success for Greek morale on 21 October by sailing his torpedo boat No. 11, in the cover of night, into the harbour of Thessaloniki, sinking the old Ottoman ironclad corvette Feth-i Bülend and escaping unharmed. On the same day, Greek troops of the Epirus Army seized the Ottoman naval base of Preveza. Though the Ottomans scuttled the four ships present there, the Greeks were able to salvage the Italian-built torpedo-boats Antalya and Tokad, which were commissioned into the Greek Navy as Nikopolis and Tatoi, respectively. A few days later, on 9 November, the wooden Ottoman armed steamer Trabzon was intercepted and sunk by the Greek torpedo boat No. 14, under Lieutenant-General Periklis Argyropoulos, of Ayvalık.

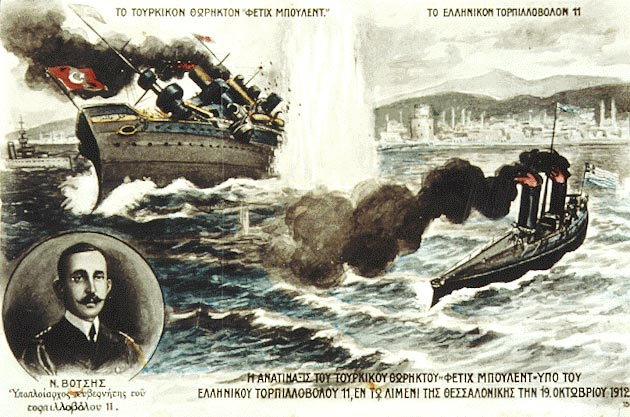
A depiction of the sinking of the Feth-i Bülend in a popular lithograph. Votsis is shown in the lower left-hand corner.

By mid-November, Greek naval detachments had seized the islands of Imbros, Thasos, Agios Efstratios, Samothrace, Psara and Ikaria, and landings were undertaken on the larger islands of Lesbos and Chios only on 21 and 27 November, respectively. Substantial Ottoman garrisons were present on the latter two islands, and their resistance was fierce. They withdrew into the mountainous interior and were not subdued until 22 December 1912 and until 3 January 1913, respectively. Samos, officially an autonomous principality, was not attacked until 13 March 1913, out of a desire not to upset the Italians in the nearby Dodecanese. The clashes were short-lived, as the Ottoman forces withdrew to the Anatolian mainland, and the island was securely in Greek hands by 16 March.

At the same time, with the aid of numerous merchant ships converted to auxiliary cruisers, a loose naval blockade on the Ottoman coasts from the Dardanelles to Suez was instituted, which disrupted the Ottomans' flow of supplies (only the Black Sea routes to Romania remained open) and left some 250,000 Ottoman troops immobilized in Asia. Given the incomplete state of the Ottoman rail network, the Greek blockade meant that Ottomans' Asian reinforcements often had to march on foot in exhausting marches towards Constantinople before they could cross into Europe and affect the course of operations there. This contributed to the Balkan League's early victories in the Balkans.

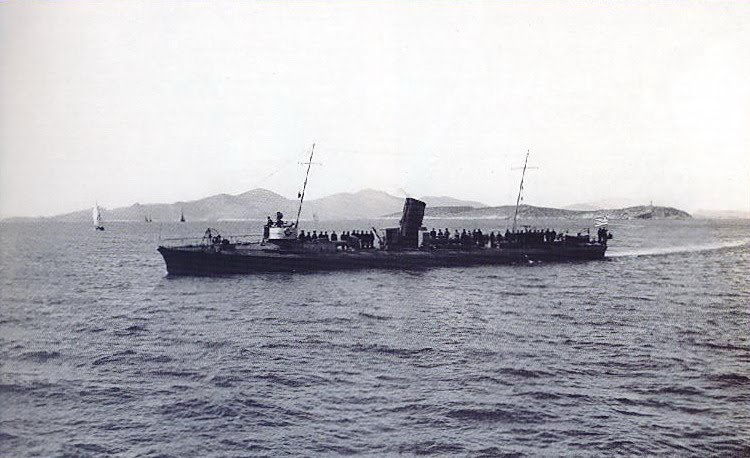
The torpedo boat Nikopolis, former Ottoman Antalya, captured at Preveza by the Greeks

In the Ionian Sea, the Greek fleet operated without opposition, ferrying supplies for the army units on the Epirus front. Furthermore, the Greeks bombarded and then blockaded the port of Vlorë in Albania on 3 December and Durrës on 27 February. A naval blockade, extending from the pre-war Greek border to Vlorë, was also instituted on 3 December, isolating the newly established Provisional Government of Albania that was based there from any outside support.

=== Confrontations off the Dardanelles ===
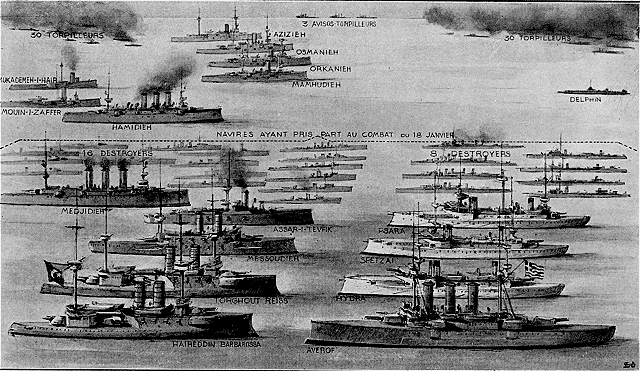
Diagram in the journal L'Illustration of the main surface vessels in the Greek and Ottoman fleets

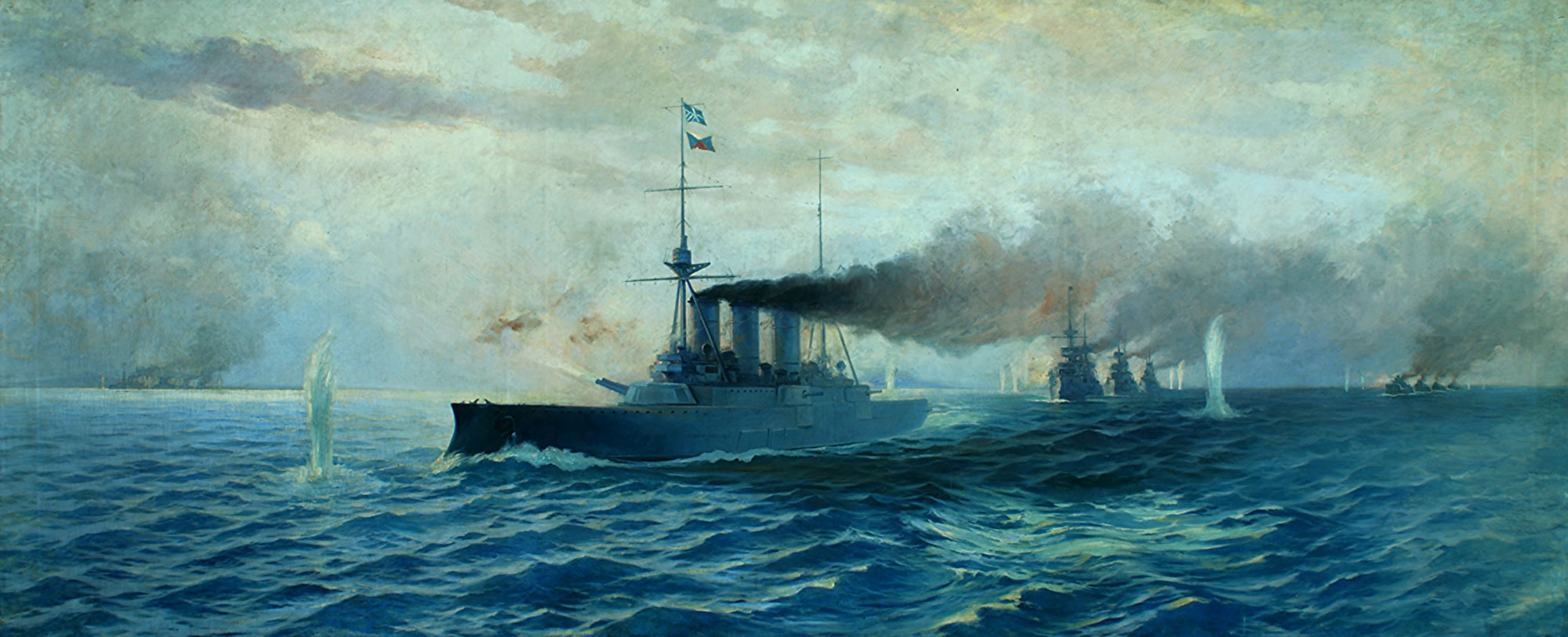
The Naval Battle of Elli, oil painting by Vassileios Chatzis, 1913.

The main Ottoman fleet remained inside the Dardanelles for the early part of the war, and the Greek destroyers continuously patrolled the straits' exit to report on a possible sortie. Kountouriotis suggested mining them, but that was not taken up out of fear of international opinion. On 7 December, the head of the Ottoman fleet, Tahir Bey, was replaced by Ramiz Naman Bey, the leader of the hawkish faction among the officer corps. A new strategy was agreed with the Ottomans to take advantage of any absence of Georgios Averof to attack the other Greek ships. The Ottoman staff formulated a plan to lure a number of the Greek destroyers on patrol into a trap. The first attempt, on 12 December, failed because of boiler trouble, but a second attempt, two days later, resulted in an indecisive engagement between the Greek destroyers and the cruiser Mecidiye.

The war's first significant fleet action, the Battle of Elli, was fought two days later, on 16 December [O.S. 3 December] 1912. The Ottoman fleet, with four battleships, nine destroyers and six torpedo boats, sailed to the entrance of the straits. The lighter Ottoman vessels remained behind, but the battleship squadron continued south, covered by forts at Kumkale, and engaged the Greek fleet coming from Imbros at 9:40. Leaving the older battleships to follow their original course, Kountouriotis led the Averof into independent action: using her superior speed, she cut across the Ottoman fleet's bow. Under fire from two sides, the Ottomans were quickly forced to withdraw to the Dardanelles. The whole engagement lasted less than an hour in which the Ottomans suffered heavy damage to the Barbaros Hayreddin and 18 dead and 41 wounded (most during their disorderly retreat) and the Greeks had one dead and seven wounded.

In the aftermath of Elli, on 20 December, the energetic Lieutenant Commander Rauf Bey was placed in effective command of the Ottoman fleet. Two days later, he led his forces out in the hope of again trapping the patrolling Greek destroyers between two divisions of the Ottoman fleet, one heading for Imbros and the other waiting at the entrance of the straits. The plan failed as the Greek ships quickly broke contact. At the same time, the Mecidiye came under attack by the Greek submarine Delfin, which launched a torpedo against it but missed; it was the first such attack in history. The Ottoman army continued to press upon a reluctant Navy a plan for the reoccupation of Tenedos, which the Greek destroyers used as a base, by an amphibious operation scheduled for 4 January. That day, weather conditions were ideal, and the fleet was ready, but the Yenihan regiment earmarked for the operation failed to arrive on time. The naval staff still ordered the fleet to carry out a sortie, and an engagement developed with the Greek fleet without any significant results for either side. Though similar sorties followed on 10 and 11 January, the results of the "cat and mouse" operations were always the same: "The Greek destroyers always managed to remain outside the Ottoman warships' range and each time the cruisers fired a few rounds before breaking off the chase."

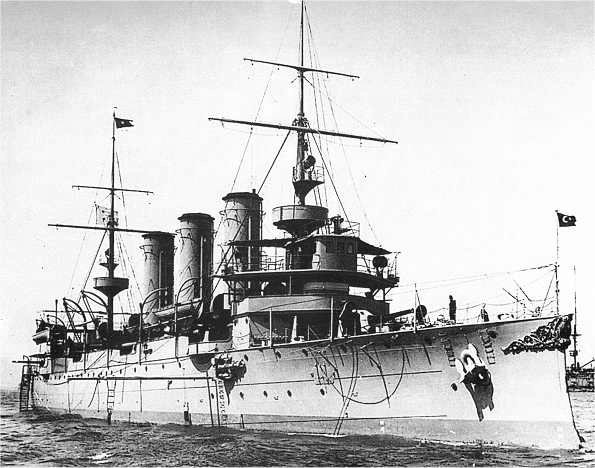
Ottoman cruiser Hamidiye. Its exploits during its eight-month cruise through the Mediterranean were a major morale booster for the Ottomans.

In preparation for the next attempt to break the Greek blockade, the Ottoman Admiralty sought to create a diversion by sending the light cruiser Hamidiye, captained by Rauf Bey, to raid Greek merchant shipping in the Aegean. It was hoped that the Georgios Averof, the only substantial Greek unit fast enough to catch the Hamidiye, would be drawn into pursuit, weakening the remaining Greek fleet. In the event, Hamidiye slipped through the Greek patrols on the night of 14–15 January and bombarded the harbour of the Greek island of Syros, sinking the Greek auxiliary cruiser Makedonia, which lay in anchor there (it was later raised and repaired). The Hamidiye then left the Aegean for the Eastern Mediterranean, making stops at Beirut and Port Said before it entered the Red Sea. Although it provided a significant morale boost for the Ottomans, the operation failed to achieve its primary objective since Kountouriotis refused to leave his post and pursue the Hamidiye.

Four days later, on 18 January [O.S. 5 January] 1913, when the Ottoman fleet again sallied from the straits towards Lemnos, it was defeated for a second time in the Battle of Lemnos. This time, the Ottoman warships concentrated their fire on the Averof, which again made use of its superior speed and tried to "cross the T" of the Ottoman fleet. Barbaros Hayreddin was again heavily damaged, and the Ottoman fleet was forced to return to the shelter of the Dardanelles and their forts, with 41 killed and 101 wounded. It was the last attempt for the Ottoman navy to leave the Dardanelles, which left the Greeks dominant in the Aegean. On 5 February [O.S. 24 January] 1913, a Greek Farman MF.7, piloted by Lieutenant Michael Moutousis and with Ensign Aristeidis Moraitinis as an observer, carried out aerial patrol of the Ottoman fleet in its anchorage at Nagara and launched four bombs on the anchored ships. Although it scored no hits, it is regarded as the first naval-air operation in military history.

General Ivanov, the commander of the Second Bulgarian Army, acknowledged the role of the Greek fleet in the overall Balkan League victory by stating that "the activity of the entire Greek fleet and above all the Averof was the chief factor in the general success of the allies." The Ottomans were also aware of the impact of the Greek naval actions on the conflict; according to navy commander Hasan Sami Bey, without the Greek navy establishing control of the sea lanes, "the allied land operations would have undoubtedly taken another course."

== Atrocities and migrations ==
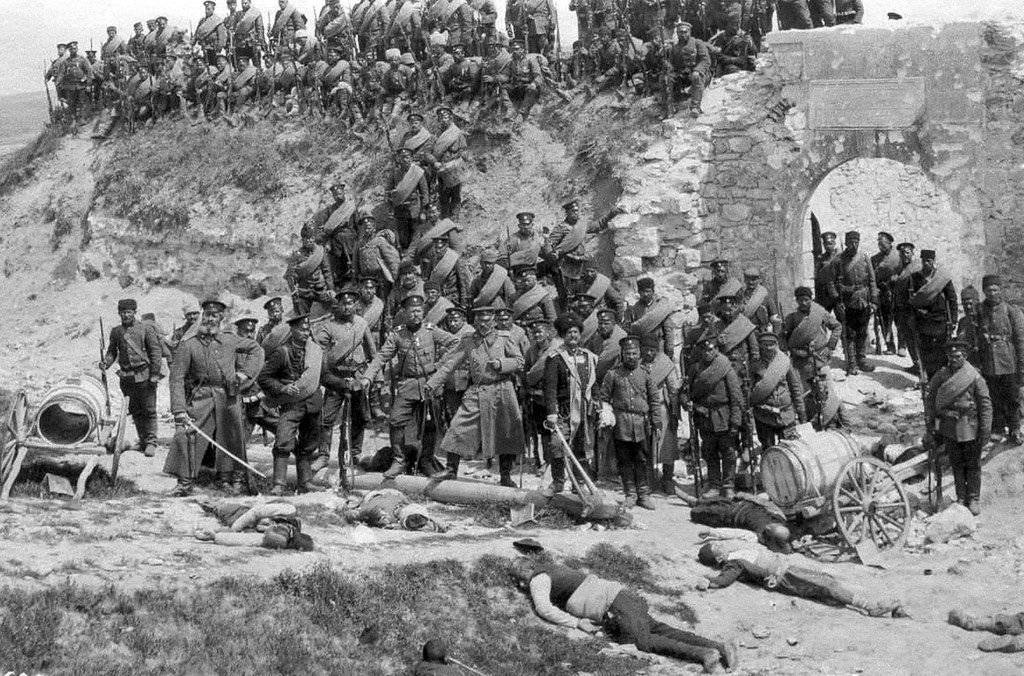
Bulgarian soldiers with bodies of killed Turkish civilians at the Awaz Baba Fort outside Adrianople (Edirne), March 1913

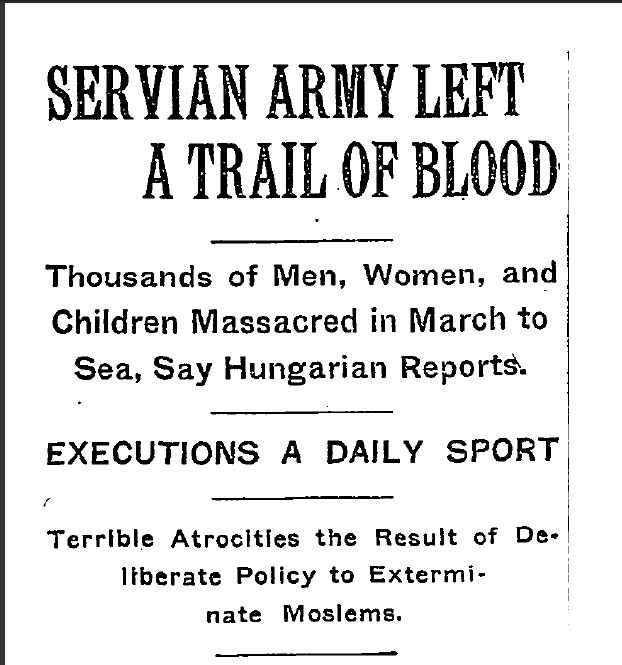
31 December 1912 New York Times headline

Although it is known that both sides committed various war crimes during the war, what is known about the number of casualties is controversial. The insufficient number of impartial observers in the region throughout the war makes it difficult to conclude civilian casualties. The intense influx of refugees from the region and the news of the massacres caused a deep shock in the Ottoman mainland. This further increased the hatred of minorities already present in Ottoman society. The situation became a factor that exacerbated the Ottoman genocides in World War I, which took place approximately two years after the end of the First Balkan War.

In both the First Balkan War and in the Second Balkan War, both military and civilian deaths are estimated at around 140,000 in total by economic and social historians Robert William Fogel, Dora L. Costa, Roderick Floud, Bernard Harris and Sok Chul Hong. It is also estimated that, in the years 1912–1914, around 890,000 civilians of various nationalities crossed the borders of the Balkan countries, including also those of the Ottoman Empire.

The war itself began partly due to massacres, in particular massacres by Turks (muhacirs from Austrian-held Bosnia-Herzegovina to Ottoman-ruled Macedonia) and Albanians against Greek, Serbian and Bulgarian Christians:

After the annexation of Bosnia Herzegovina, the Young Turks sent agents into those countries to induce the Moslem population to emigrate to Macedonia. These immigrants, or muhadjers, as they were called, were settled by the [Ottoman] Government in those districts where the Moslem population was weak. The experiment, which was not without precedent, proved disastrous. The element which could be induced to emigrate was ignorant, unruly, fanatical, and economically worthless. The presence of this lawless, malcontent element in Macedonia ended in irretrievable disaster for Turkey. They readily united with the Albanian Moslem immigrants to perpetrate the succession of massacres in 1912 which resulted ultimately in the formation of the Balkan Alliance.

=== By Balkan League ===
==== By Greece ====
Greece is recognized as "far less violent towards Muslim civilians than its Serbian and Bulgarian allies" and the country's soldiers, for the most part, maintained their discipline. The Times dispatch to Thessaloniki wrote in December 1912 that "no massacres are recorded" by the Greek Army which "controlled [its] auxiliaries effectively". MP and investigator J. Howard Whitehouse agreed in May 1913, writing that most atrocities were committed by irregulars.

Nevertheless, some cruelties ensued. For example, Greek irregulars in Lesbos committed killings and other acts of violence against Turkish civilians, which caused the Greek military authorities to disarm them and punish the perpetrators.

In the mainland, some Greek soldiers occasionally broke into Turkish houses, thoroughly looted them and set some on fire. The Report of the International Commission on the Balkan Wars reported that, at Giannitsa, the Muslim quarter was almost entirely burned, and it reported Turkish villages around Thessaloniki also being burned by Greek troops. Greek officers tried to prevent this violence, but sometimes they were met with "great difficulty", as some units were hard to control. One Greek officer wrote:

This war is sacred and noble... but it is also destructive. We have prevented the men from looting thus far with great difficulty, but often we are not able to stop them at all... Here in Servia... the soldiers... broke into the Turkish houses, which they looted thoroughly, setting fire to some of them.

Soldiers looting homes or mistreating civilians were nevertheless still "severely punished" by the Greek authorities. For example, even Crown Prince Constantine of Greece, the commander-in-chief of the Greek Army, personally attacked a group of soldiers caught looting with his whip and urged his subordinates to treat them with "utmost strictness".

Approximately 10,000 Turks left the Greek-held areas during the war, but many Muslim peasants, instead, fled into Greek-held territory to get away from the Serbian or Bulgarian armies, and, especially, from the bands of irregulars which accompanied them.

One year after the Treaty of Bucharest, the Ottoman government tried to induce 110,000 to 115,000 Muslims to leave Greek-held central and eastern Macedonia for Thrace, in order to fill the gap caused by the 1914 Greek deportations. Greece tried to halt or reduce this emigration, seeing it as a matter of "national interest" and as a way to avert "economic disaster" in the region.Themistoklis Sofoulis wrote to Eleftherios Venizelos that he feared that Muslim refugees arriving in Asia Minor would be deliberately presented as victims of Greek persecution and inflame anti-Greek sentiment there. Sofoulis, then, instructed the administrative, judicial, financial, and police authorities of Greece to be impartial towards Muslims, including Turks, and to show "fatherly conduct" towards everyone without regard to religion, race, and language.

Greece, however, mostly failed to prevent the emigration, as 76,893 Muslims left Greek Macedonia for Anatolia through Thessaloniki and Kavala from November 1912–March 1915.

==== By Bulgaria ====
During the war, Turks in Bulgarian-held territories were subjected to massacres, pillaging, the burning of villages and forced displacement. Bulgarian irregulars massacred Turkish civilians at Çirmen, near Cisr-i Mustafa Paşa, killing women, children and elderly inhabitants before burning the village.

At Serres, where a Bulgarian garrison and regular administration had been established following the Ottoman retreat, another massacre of Turks occurred in November 1912. An American relief worker familiar with the town estimated that no more than approximately 200 people had been killed. The killings were carried out chiefly by Macedonian Bulgarian komitadjis and operated in the presence of Bulgarian military authorities who possessed sufficient forces to restrain them, but did not do so.

Nevertheless, in December 1912, Deputy Commander-in-Chief Mihail Savov condemned plunder and violence against civilians as "reprehensible and inhumane", ordered offenders prosecuted regardless of rank and declared civilians of all religions and nationalities to be under Bulgarian military protection.

94,374 Muslims left the Bulgarian-held territories for Anatolia through Thessaloniki and Kavala during and after the war, from November 1912–March 1915.

==== By Serbia and Montenegro ====
Following the Serbian occupation of Strumica in November 1912, large-scale killings of the town's Turkish population began. British Consul-General Harry Lamb reported that after command of the town passed to a Serbian commander, a tribunal headed by the Serbian commandant was established to judge local Turks. Turkish men between approximately 20 and 50 years of age were rounded up, and those condemned were taken outside the town and shot or bayoneted. According to Lamb's investigation, 557 Turks were killed between late November and December 1912.

Nevertheless, Minister of War Radivoje Bojović instructed General Radomir Putnik to order troops to spare peaceful civilians, women and children, and Serbian military instructions ordered irregulars engaged in plunder, revenge or violence against local inhabitants to be disarmed, punished or brought before military courts.

There were various instances where Albanian communities were targeted especially by Serbian and Montenegrin forces. According to contemporary accounts, c. 20,000–25,000 Albanians in the Kosovo Vilayet were killed in the first two to four months of the conflict. The Serbian Social Democrat politician Kosta Novaković claimed more than 120,000 deaths and 50,000 expelled Albanians by the end of the Second Balkan War, while Serbian deputy Triša Kaclerović affirmed that number of deaths in the Balkan Wars, in 1917. Hundreds of thousands of Albanians were deported throughout the Balkan Wars.

Despite being allied to Bulgaria, Serbian authorities committed a wide range of persecutions against the Bulgarian population in Macedonia. When the Serbs entered Macedonia, they were surprised and disappointed to discover that many of the inhabitants identified themselves as Bulgarians. Serbian authorities arrested Bulgarian administrators, closed Bulgarian schools and harassed Bulgarian priests. IMRO detachments were also disarmed and persecuted.

=== By the Ottoman Empire ===
Successive Ottoman defeats already from 1911 and territorial losses resulted in the creation of strong nationalist tendencies in Turkish politics. The Adana massacre in 1909 had already caused the deaths of 1,250 Greeks.

During the Balkan Wars, between 1912 and 1913, 15,690 Greeks were massacred in Eastern Thrace, accompanied by pillaging and acts of intimidation and violence.

In addition, many Macedonian Greeks were also massacred. 180 Greeks from Mavrochori who took refuge in a mosque were slain by Turkish troops in December 1912, while one month earlier, in November, 52 Greeks from Metaxas were sent to Servia where, alongside 73 other Greeks from there, were rounded up and massacred. Out of the 125 total, only 4 survived and escaped.

In the spring of 1913, the Ottoman authorities began a systematic campaign of persecution of their Greek subjects in large numbers in towns and villages both in Eastern Thrace and Anatolia. This campaign of extermination by the Ottoman authorities included boycott, expulsions, forcible migrations, focusing on Greeks of the Aegean region and eastern Thrace, whose presence in these areas was deemed a threat to national security.

During the war, Bulgarians in Ottoman-held territories were subjected to massacres, pillaging and the destruction of villages by Ottoman troops and irregulars. At Bunarhissar, contemporary reports stated that retreating Ottoman troops imprisoned approximately 200 Bulgarians in barracks before setting the building on fire, killing those inside. During the same retreat toward Lüleburgaz, Ottoman troops also massacred approximately 200 inhabitants of the village of Atvali, including women, children and elderly.

At Komotini, in November 1912, members of the Macedonian-Adrianopolitan Volunteer Corps encountered the bodies of approximately 50 murdered Bulgarian peasants while marching through the area. Among the victims were women and an infant who were killed by the Turks.

=== By Albanian chetas ===
The Albanian declaration of independence festered further violence, as Albanian villagers created paramilitaries to fight against Ottoman forces. These paramilitaries were also responsible for destroying churches and targeting Greek-speaking Christian villages, killing women and children.

== Reasons for Ottoman defeat ==
The principal reason for the Ottoman defeat in the autumn of 1912 was the decision on the part of the Ottoman government to respond to the demands from the Balkan League on 15 October 1912 by declaring war at a time when its mobilization, ordered on 1 October, was only partially complete. During the declaration of war, 580,000 Ottoman soldiers in the Balkans faced 912,000 soldiers of the Balkan League. The bad condition of the roads, together with the sparse railroad network, had led to the Ottoman mobilization being grossly behind schedule, and many of the commanders were new to their units, having been appointed only on 1 October 1912. Many Turkish divisions were still involved in a losing war with Italy far away in the Libyan provinces. The stress of fighting on multiple fronts took a massive toll on the Ottoman Empire's finances, morale, casualties and supplies. The Turkish historian Handan Nezir Akmeşe wrote that the best response when they were faced with the Balkan League's ultimatum on 15 October on the part of the Ottomans would have been to try to stall for time via diplomacy while they completed their mobilization, instead of declaring war immediately.

War Minister Nazım Pasha, Navy Minister Mahmud Muhtar Pasha and Austrian military attaché Josef Pomiankowski had presented overly-optimistic pictures of the Ottoman readiness for war to the Cabinet in October 1912 advising that the Ottoman forces should take the offensive at once at the outbreak of hostilities. By contrast, many senior army commanders advocated taking the defensive when the war began, arguing that the incomplete mobilization and serious logistic problems made taking the offensive impossible. Other reasons for the defeat were:

- Under the tyrannical and paranoid regime of Sultan Abdul Hamid II, the Ottoman army had been forbidden to engage in war games or maneuvers out of the fear that it might be the cover for a coup d'état. The four years since the Young Turk Revolution of 1908 had not been enough time for the army to learn how to conduct large-scale maneuvers. War games in 1909 and 1910 had shown that many Ottoman officers could not efficiently move large bodies of troops such as divisions and corps, a deficiency that General Baron Colmar von der Goltz stated after watching the 1909 war games would take at least five years of training to address.
- The Ottoman army was divided into two classes; Nizamiye troops (conscripted for five years) and Redif (reservists who served for seven years). Training of the Redif troops had been neglected for decades, and the 50,000 Redif troops in the Balkans in 1912 had received extremely rudimentary training at best. One German officer, Major Otto von Lossow, who served with the Ottomans, complained that some of the Redif troops did not know how to handle or fire a rifle.
- Support services in the Ottoman army, such as logistics and medical services, were poor. There was a massive shortage of doctors, no ambulances and few stretchers, and the few medical faculties were entirely inadequate for treating the large numbers of wounded. This resulted in most of them dying, which damaged morale. In particular, the badly-organized transport corps was so inefficient that it was unable to supply the troops in the field with food, which forced troops to resort to requisitioning food from local villages. Even so, Ottoman soldiers lived below the subsistence level with a daily diet of 90 g of cheese and 150 g of meat but had to march all day long, leaving much of the army sickly and exhausted.
- The heavy rainfall in the fall of 1912 had turned the mud roads of the Balkans into quagmires, making it extremely difficult to supply the army in the field with ammunition, which led to constant shortages at the front.
- After the 1908 revolution, the Ottoman officer corps had become politicized, with many officers devoting themselves to politics at the expense of studying war. Furthermore, the politicization of the army had led it to be divided into factions, most notably between those who were members of the Committee of Union and Progress and its opponents. Additionally, the Ottoman officer corps had been divided between Alayli ("ranker") officers who had been promoted up from NCOs and privates and the Mektepli ("college-trained") officers who had graduated from the War College. After the 1909 counterrevolution attempt, many of the Alayli officers had been purged. The bulk of the army, peasant conscripts from Anatolia, were much more comfortable with the Alayli officers than with the Mektepli officers, who came from a different social milieu. Furthermore, the decision to conscript non-Muslims for the first time meant that jihad, the traditional motivating force for the Ottoman Army, was not used in 1912, something that the officers of the German military mission advising the Ottomans believed was bad for the Muslims' morale.

== Aftermath ==
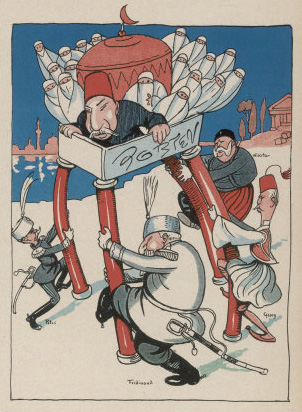
Danish cartoon shows Balkan states attacking the Ottoman Empire in the First Balkan War, October 1912

The Treaty of London ended the First Balkan War on 30 May 1913. All Ottoman territory west of the Enez-Kıyıköy line was ceded to the Balkan League, according to the status quo at the time of the armistice. The treaty also declared Albania an independent state. Most of the territory designated to form the new Albanian state was occupied by Serbia and Greece, who only reluctantly withdrew their troops. Having unresolved disputes with Serbia over the division of northern Macedonia and with Greece over southern Macedonia, Bulgaria was prepared, if the need arose, to solve the problems by force, and began transferring its military from Eastern Thrace to the disputed regions. Unwilling to yield to any pressure, Greece and Serbia settled their mutual differences and signed a military alliance directed against Bulgaria on 1 May 1913, even before the Treaty of London had been concluded. This was soon followed by a treaty of "mutual friendship and protection" on 19 May / 1 June 1913. This set the stage for the Second Balkan War.

== Great Powers ==
Although the Great Powers noticed the developments that led to the war, they had an official consensus over the territorial integrity of the Ottoman Empire, which led to a stern warning to the Balkan states. However, each Great Power took a different unofficial diplomatic approach since interests conflicted. Since the mixed unofficial signals cancelled any possible preventive effect of the mutual official warning, they failed to prevent or end the war:

- Russia was a prime mover in the establishment of the Balkan League and saw it as an essential tool in case of a future war against its rival, Austria-Hungary. Russia was unaware of the Bulgarian plans for Thrace and Constantinople, territories for which it had long held ambitions.
- France, not feeling ready for a war against Germany in 1912, took a position strongly against the war and firmly informed its ally Russia that it would not take part in a potential conflict between Russia and Austria-Hungary if it resulted from actions of the Balkan League. France, however, failed to achieve British participation in a common intervention to stop the conflict.
- The British Empire, although officially a staunch supporter of the Ottoman Empire's integrity, took secret diplomatic steps encouraging the Greek entry into the League to counteract Russian influence. At the same time, it encouraged Bulgarian aspirations over Thrace since the British preferred Thrace to be Bulgarian to Russian, despite British assurances to Russia on its expansion there.
- Austria-Hungary, struggling for an exit from the Adriatic and seeking ways for expansion in the south at the expense of the Ottoman Empire, was opposed to any other nation expanding in the area. At the same time, Austria-Hungary had internal problems with the significant Slavic populations that campaigned against the German–Hungarian joint control of the multinational state. Serbia, whose aspirations towards Bosnia were no secret, was considered an enemy and the primary tool of Russian machinations, which were behind the agitation of the Slav subjects. However, Austria-Hungary failed to achieve a German backup for a strong reaction. Initially, German Emperor Wilhelm II told Austro-Hungarian Archduke Franz Ferdinand that Germany was ready to support Austria-Hungary in all circumstances, even at the risk of a world war, but the Austro-Hungarians hesitated. Finally, in the German Imperial War Council of 8 December 1912, the consensus was that Germany would not be ready for war until at least mid-1914 and notes about that passed to Austria-Hungary. Thus, no actions could be taken when the Serbs acceded to the Austro-Hungarian ultimatum of 18 October and withdrew from Albania.
- The German Empire, already heavily involved in internal Ottoman politics, officially opposed the war. However, Germany's effort to win Bulgaria for the Central Powers, since Germany saw the inevitability of Ottoman disintegration, made Germany toy with the idea of replacing the Ottomans in the Balkans with a friendly Greater Bulgaria with the borders of the Treaty of San Stefano. This was based on the German origin of the Bulgarian King Ferdinand and his anti-Russian sentiments. Finally, when tensions again grew hot in July 1914 between Serbia and Austria-Hungary, when Gavrilo Princip assassinated Franz Ferdinand, no one had strong reservations about the possible conflict, and the First World War broke out.

== List of battles ==
=== Bulgarian–Ottoman battles ===
Battle	Year	Bulgaria Commander	Ottoman Empire Commander	Result
Battle of Kardzhali	1912	Vasil Delov	Mehmed Pasha	Bulgarian Victory
Battle of Kirk Kilisse	1912	Radko Dimitriev	Mahmut Pasha	Bulgarian Victory
Battle of Lule Burgas	1912	Radko Dimitriev	Abdullah Pasha	Bulgarian Victory
Siege of Edirne / Adrianople	1912–13	Nikola Ivanov	Gazi Pasha	Bulgarian Victory
First Battle of Çatalca	1912	Radko Dimitriev	Nazim Pasha	Ottoman Victory
Naval Battle of Kaliakra	1912	Dimitar Dobrev	Hüseyin Bey	Bulgarian Victory
Battle of Merhamli	1912	Nikola Genev	Mehmed Pasha	Bulgarian Victory
Battle of Bulair	1913	Georgi Todorov	Mustafa Kemal	Bulgarian Victory
Second Battle of Çatalca	1913	Vasil Kutinchev	Ahmet Pasha	Indecisive
Battle of Şarköy	1913	Stiliyan Kovachev	Enver Pasha	Bulgarian Victory

=== Greek–Ottoman battles ===
Battle	Year	Greece Commander	Ottoman Empire Commander	Result
Battle of Sarantaporo	1912	Constantine I	Hasan Pasha	Greek Victory
Battle of Yenidje	1912	Constantine I	Hasan Pasha	Greek Victory
Battle of Sorovich	1912	Matthaiopoulos	Hasan Pasha	Ottoman Victory
Battle of Nicopolis	1912	Sapountzakis	Esat Pasha	Greek Victory
Battle of Pente Pigadia	1912	Sapountzakis	Esat Pasha	Greek Victory
Battle of Lesbos	1912	Kountouriotis	Abdul Ghani	Greek Victory
Battle of Chios	1912	Damianos	Zihne Bey	Greek Victory
Battle of Driskos	1912	Matthaiopoulos	Esad Pasha	Ottoman Victory
Revolt of Himara	1912	Sapountzakis	Esat Pasha	Greek Victory
Battle of Elli	1912	Kountouriotis	Remzi Bey	Greek Victory
Capture of Korytsa	1912	Damianos	Davit Pasha	Greek Victory
Battle of Lemnos	1913	Kountouriotis	Remzi Bey	Greek Victory
Battle of Bizani	1913	Constantine I	Esat Pasha	Greek Victory

=== Serbian–Ottoman battles ===
Battle	Year	Serbia Commander	Ottoman Empire Commander	Result
Battle of Kumanovo	1912	Radomir Putnik	Zeki Pasha	Serbian victory
Battle of Prilep	1912	Petar Bojović	Zeki Pasha	Serbian victory
Battle of Monastir	1912	Petar Bojović	Zeki Pasha	Serbian victory
Battle of Lumë	1912	Božidar Jankovic	Bajram Curri	Serbian victory
Siege of Scutari	1913	Nikola I	Hasan Pasha	Montenegrin–Serbian victory, status quo ante bellum
Siege of Adrianople	1913	Stepa Stepanovic	Gazi Pasha	Serbian victory

== See also ==
- Timeline of the First Balkan War
- List of places burned during the Balkan Wars
- List of Serbian–Turkish conflicts
- Journalists of the Balkan Wars
- 1913 Ottoman coup d'état

== Sources ==
- Ministerstvo na voynata, Shtab na armiyata – Voenno-istoricheska komisiya (1928–1937). Voynata mezhdu Balgariya i Turtsiya 1912–1913 [The War Between Bulgaria and Turkey 1912–1913] (in Bulgarian). Vol. I–VII. Sofia: Darzhavna pechatnitsa.
- Markov, Georgi (2012). Balgariya v Balkanskiya sayuz sreshtu Osmanskata imperiya, 1911–1913 [Bulgaria in the Balkan League against the Ottoman Empire, 1911–1913] (in Bulgarian). Sofia: Zahariy Stoyanov. ISBN 978-954-09-0725-3.
- Markov, Georgi (2017). Balgarskoto krushenie 1913 [The Bulgarian Catastrophe 1913] (in Bulgarian). Sofia: Zahariy Stoyanov. ISBN 978-954-09-1166-3.
- Borodziej, Włodzimierz; Górny, Maciej (2021). Forgotten Wars: Central and Eastern Europe, 1912–1916. Translated by Tilbury, Jasper. Cambridge: Cambridge University Press. ISBN 978-1-108-83715-6.
- Akçam, Taner (2004). From empire to republic: Turkish nationalism and the Armenian genocide. London, England: Zed Books. doi:10.5040/9781350220263. ISBN 978-1-84277-526-4.
- Akmeşe, Handan Nezir (2015). The Birth of Modern Turkey: The Ottoman Military and the March to World I. I.B. Tauris.
- Alpion, Gëzim (2021). Mother Teresa: The Saint and Her Nation. Bloomsbury. ISBN 9789389812466.
- Dillon, Emile Joseph (1920). The Inside Story of the Peace Conference. New York & London: Harper & Brothers – via Project Gutenberg.
- Erickson, Edward J. (2003). Defeat in Detail: The Ottoman Army in the Balkans, 1912–1913. Westport, CT: Greenwood. ISBN 0-275-97888-5.
- Fotakis, Zisis (2005). Greek Naval Strategy and Policy, 1910–1919. London: Routledge. ISBN 978-0-415-35014-3.
- Fuller, Joseph Vincent (2005) [1922]. Bismarck's Diplomacy at Its Zenith. Harvard Historical Studies. Whitefish: Kessinger Publishing. ISBN 9781432617516.
- Gawrych, George (2006). The Crescent and the Eagle: Ottoman rule, Islam and the Albanians, 1874–1913. IB Tauris. ISBN 978-1-84511-287-5.
- Ginio, Eyal (2023). "From Cisr-i Mustafa Paşa to Svilengrad: The Ethnic Homogenization of a Thracian Town in the Balkan Wars". International Journal of Middle East Studies. 55 (2): 275–298. doi:10.1017/S0020743823000788.
- Hall, Richard C. (2000). The Balkan Wars, 1912–1913: Prelude to the First World War. London: Routledge. ISBN 0-415-22946-4.
- Halo, Thea (2017). "The Genocide of the Ottoman Greeks, 1913–23: Myths and Facts". In Shirinian, George N. (ed.). Genocide in the Ottoman Empire: Armenians, Assyrians, and Greeks, 1913–1923. New York: Berghahn Books. ISBN 978-1-78533-433-7.
- Hofmann, Tessa (2012). "The Genocide against the Christians in the Late Ottoman Period, 1912–1922". In Shirinian, George N. (ed.). The Asia Minor Catastrophe and the Ottoman Greek Genocide: Essays on Asia Minor, Pontos, and Eastern Thrace, 1912–1923. Bloomingdale, Illinois: Asia Minor and Pontos Hellenic Research Center. pp. 43–67. ISBN 9781467534963.
- Jagodić, Miloš (2013). Novi krajevi Srbije (1912–1915) (in Serbian). Belgrade: Filozofski fakultet, Univerzitet u Beogradu. ISBN 9788688803175.
- Jazexhiu, Osli (2011). Ottomans into Illyrians : passages to nationhood in 20th century Albania (PhD thesis). Florence: European University Institute. doi:10.2870/2275683.
- Kondis, Basil (1976). Greece and Albania, 1908–1914. Thessaloniki: Institute for Balkan Studies. ISBN 979-8-8409-4908-5.
- Langensiepen, Bernd; Güleryüz, Ahmet (1995). The Ottoman Steam Navy, 1828–1923. London: Conway Maritime Press/Bloomsbury. ISBN 0-85177-610-8.
- Malcolm, Noel (1998). Kosovo: a short history. London: Macmillan. ISBN 978-0-333-66612-8 – via Internet Archive.
- Mavridakis, Ioannis (2012). "Η Συμβολή του Πεζικού στους Βαλκανικούς Αγώνες 1912–1913" Η Συμβολή του Πεζικού στους Βαλκανικούς Αγώνες 1912–1913 [The Contribution of the Infantry to the Balkan Wars 1912–1913]. Στρατιωτική Επιθεώρηση.
- Rifati, Fitim (2021). "Kryengritjet shqiptare në Kosovë si alternativë çlirimi nga sundimi serbo-malazez (1913–1914)" (PDF). Journal of Balkan Studies. 1: 69–91. doi:10.51331/A004. ISSN 2671-3675. Archived from the original (PDF) on 16 June 2023.
- Ruches, Pyrrhus J. (1965). Albania's Captives. Chicago: Argonaut – via Internet Archive.
- Seton-Watson, Hugh; Seton-Watson, Christopher (1981). The making of a New Europe: R. W. Seton-Watson and the last years of Austria-Hungary. London: Methuen. ISBN 978-0-416-74730-0.
- Seton-Watson, R. W. (2009) [1917]. The Rise of Nationality in the Balkans. Charleston, SC: BiblioBazaar. ISBN 978-1-113-88264-6.
- Sakellariou, M. V., ed. (1997). Epirus, 4000 years of Greek history and civilization. Greek lands in history. Athens: Ekdotike Athenon. ISBN 978-960-213-371-2.
- Somel, Selçuk Akşin (2003). Historical dictionary of the Ottoman Empire. Lanham, Md: Scarecrow Press. ISBN 978-0-8108-4332-5 – via Internet Archive.
- Tasić, Dmitar (2021). "Between occupation, exile and unification: sequestered and 'abandoned' properties in Serbia and Yugoslavia during and after the First World War". European Review of History: Revue européenne d'histoire. 28 (2): 176–198. doi:10.1080/13507486.2020.1856043. ISSN 1350-7486.
- Trotsky, Leon (1980) [1926]. Weissman, George; Williams, Duncan (eds.). The Balkan wars, 1912-13: the war correspondence of Leon Trotsky. New York: Monad Press.
- Tsoutsoumpis, Spyridon (2018). "Morale, Ideology and the Barbarization of Warfare among Greek Soldiers". In Boeckh, Katrin; Rutar, Sabine (eds.). The Wars of Yesterday: The Balkan Wars and the Emergence of Modern Military Conflict, 1912–13. New York: Berghahn Books. pp. 206–239. doi:10.2307/j.ctvw04j9c.12. ISBN 9781785337758.
- Turkish General Staff (1993). Balkan Harbi (1912-1913) I. Cilt - Harbin Sebepleri, Askerî Hazırlıklar Ve Osmanlı Devletinin Harbe Girişi [The Balkan War (1912–1913), Volume I: Causes of the War, Military Preparations, and the Ottoman Empire’s Entry into the War]. Genelkurmay Basimevi.
- Uyar, Mesut; Erickson, Edward (2009). A Military History of the Ottomans: From Osman to Atatürk. Santa Barbara, CA: Praeger Security International. ISBN 978-0-275-98876-0.
- Vŭchkov, Aleksandŭr (2005). The Balkan War 1912–1913. Angela. ISBN 978-954-90587-2-7.
- Zafirov, D.; Aleksandrov, E. (2007). Istoriya na Bŭlgarite: Voenna istoriya История на Българите: Военна история [History of the Bulgarians: Military History] (in Bulgarian). Sofia: Trud. ISBN 954-528-752-7.
- Report of the International Commission to Inquire into the Causes and Conduct of the Balkan War (Report). Washington, D.C.: Carnegie Endowment for International Peace. 1914 – via Internet Archive.
