= Journalists of the Balkan Wars =

List of war correspondent in the Balkan Wars

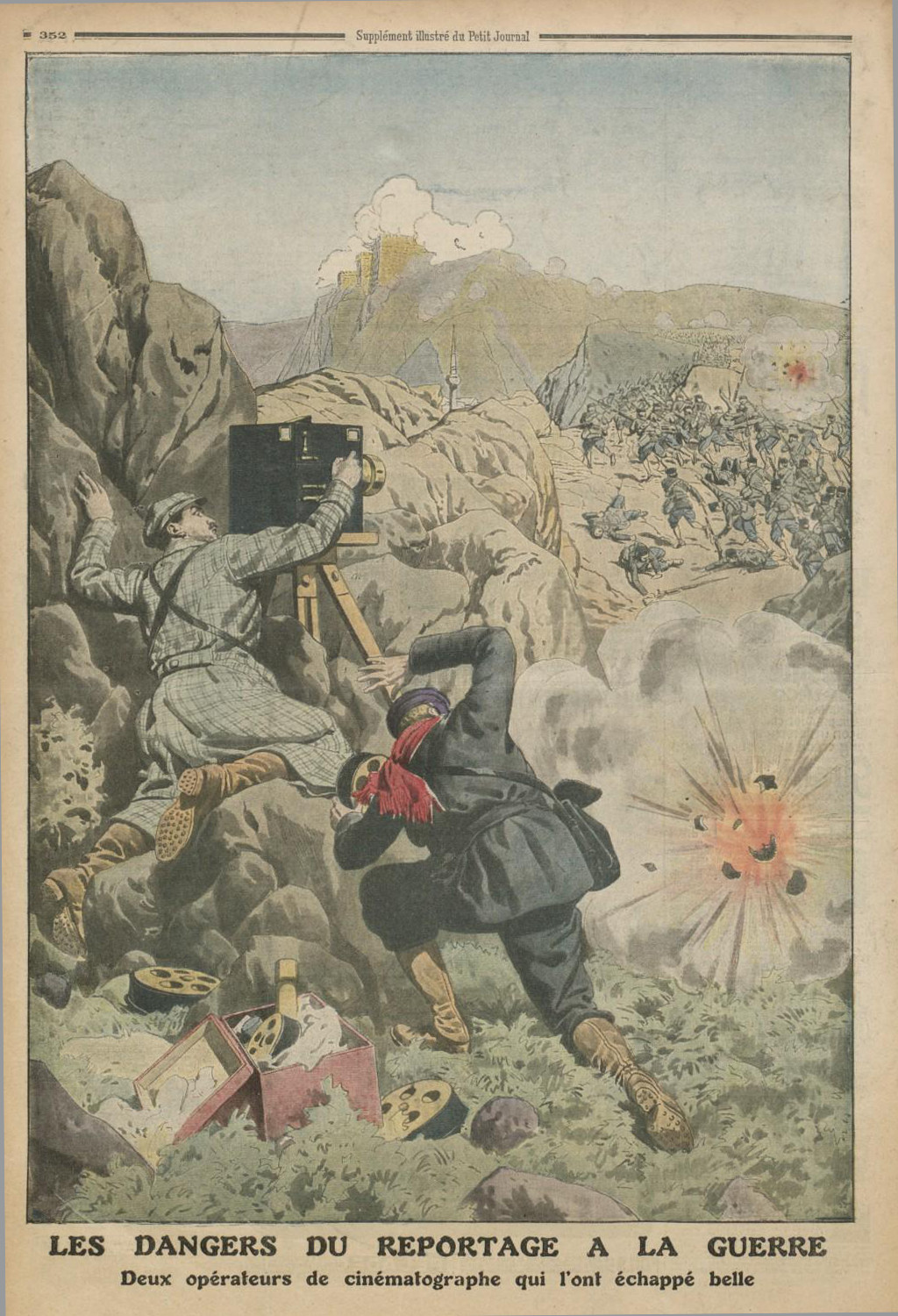
"The dangers of war reporting – Two camera operators who had a close call," Le Petit Journal (Paris), 3 November 1912, p. 352.

This page lists the known war correspondents, war photographers, war artists, and war cinematographers who were active during the First and Second Balkan Wars.

The First Balkan War lasted from October 1912 to May 1913, and comprised actions of the Balkan League (Serbia, Greece, Montenegro and Bulgaria) against the Ottoman Empire. Montenegro declared war on 8 October and Bulgaria, Serbia and Greece followed suit on 17 October. The war concluded with the signing of the Treaty of London on 30 May 1913. The Second Balkan War broke out when Bulgaria, dissatisfied with its share of the spoils of the First Balkan War, attacked its former allies, Serbia and Greece, on 29 June 1913. The war ended with the signing of the Treaty of Bucharest by the three powers on 10 August 1913.

An estimated 200–300 journalists from around the world covered the war in the Balkans in November 1912.

== Reporting on the war from Greece ==
The official censorship bureau was established at the Ministry of Foreign Affairs in Athens. Each journalist had to make an application to proceed to the front, and enclose a photograph, together with a certificate from their country's Ministry in Athens. The Greek Government then issued the journalist an identity card which identified the paper he or she represented, his or her photograph, and a copy of his or her signature. The journalist was given a spade-shaped blue-and-white badge the size of a small plate to pin on their chest, on which the letters "ΕΦ" were worked, being the initial letters of the Greek word for "Newspaper" (Εφημερίδα).

The day after the Battle of Sarantaporo, journalists were allowed to proceed to the Epirus front.

== Reporting on the war from Bulgaria ==
Following the outbreak of hostilities in 1912, almost 150 foreign correspondents rushed to Bulgaria, which was soon identified as the center of all major military developments. The Bulgarian government was successful in identifying and controlling the journalists. The authorities required each journalist to carry a red identification card that included his or her photograph and signature, to wear a red brassard that had the letters "BK" meaning военен кореспондент and a number, and to carry a document informing the various persons who the journalist was and what the Army Headquarters would allow them to do.

== Reporting on the war from Serbia ==
Forty-five journalists from all around the world assembled in Belgrade to cover the First Balkan War. Foreign journalists, unless cleared by the General Staff, were not permitted in forward positions for the duration of hostilities.

== Motion pictures and the Balkan Wars ==
The First Balkan War provided the most extensive testing ground before the First World War for the new technology of large-scale filming, with more than 20 camera operators travelling to the region. One of the first movies, and definitely the first war documentary in German film history, was created by two German cinematographers: Robert Isidor Schwobthaler, and Albert Herr. The film was titled With the Greeks in the firing line (1913). It has been preserved by the UCLA Film & Television Archive from a 35mm tinted nitrate print. It can be watched through this link. The two cinematographers are seen together for ten seconds (36:05 - 36:26) in the film. Schwobthaler is the bearded man on the left, and Albert Herr on the right of the picture. Schwobthaler is seen in several parts of the film, which probably makes Albert Herr the man behind the movie camera.

== The Journalists ==
Name	Nationality	Conflict (Note: First Balkan War (B.W.I) or Second Balkan War (B.W.II).)	News media (Note: Newspaper(s) or other media that the journalist represented.)	Area & dates (Note: Areas and dates where the journalist is known to have been active during the Balkan Wars.)	Other information
Schneider, Léonce	French	B.W.I	War cinematographer for Gaumont (Neuilly-sur-Seine).	Northern Greece	One of the first cinematographers of the First Balkan War. One of his videos shows an airplane taking off. Most probably the first video of a war airplane taking off.
Scouffos, Georges	French/Greek	B.W.I	War journalist for the Journal (Paris).	Northern Greece	
McLellan, David	British/Scottish	B.W.I	War journalist for the Daily Mirror (London).	Northern Greece	One of the first journalists to be given permission by the Greek Foreign Affairs Office to report from the war zone.
Mayov, Maud	Russian	B.W.I	War journalist for the Agence télégraphique de Saint-Pétersbourg (St. Petersburg).	Northern Greece	His name is also written as Maud Mayow.
Cassano, Mario	Italian	B.W.I	War journalist for La Stampa (Torino).	Northern Greece	
Kalapothakis, Dimitrios	Greek	B.W.I	War correspondent for the Chicago Daily News (Chicago).	Northern Greece	His name in Greek is Δημήτριος Καλαποθάκης. Born in 1867. Died in 1946.
Cavicchi, Corrado	Italian	B.W.I	War cinematographer for the Cinematografico Casa Luca Comerio (Milano).	Northern Greece	
Mavroyenis, Charalampos	Greek/British ?	B.W.I	War cinematographer for the Natural Color Kinematograph Co. (London).	Northern Greece	
Scott-Brown, J[ames]. (?)	British ?	B.W.I	War cinematographer for the Natural Color Kinematograph Co. (London).	Northern Greece	Probably the same James Scott-Brown who worked for Charles Urban.
Fries Schwenzen, Hjalmar	Norwegian	B.W.I	War correspondent for the Tidens Tegn (Oslo).	Macedonia	In his 20's he worked as a correspondent in the Balkan Wars, before starting a carrier in the theatre.
Kara, Erman	French	B.W.I	War journalist for the Journal des débats (Paris).	Macedonia & Epirus	
Koumanidis, Andreas	Greek/Russian	B.W.I	War correspondent for the Russkoye Slovo (New York).	Northern Greece	The Russkoye Slovo was a Russian language newspaper published in New York. Andreas Koumanidis (in Greek: Ανδρέας Κουμανίδης) was one of the first journalists to be given permission by the Greek Foreign Affairs Office to report from the war zone.
Cassavetti, Demetrius John	Greek/English	B.W.I	War journalist for The Times (London).	Northern Greece	One of the first journalists to be given permission by the Greek Foreign Affairs Office to report from the war zone. He wrote the book "Hellas and the Balkan Wars", published by T. Fisher Unwin. He was born in London, on February 10th 1881, and died on March 7th 1958.
Pooley, J. A. S.	English	B.W.I	War journalist for Daily Express (London).	Northern Greece	Among the first journalists to be given permission by the Greek Foreign Affairs Office to report from the war zone.
Adamopoulos, Leonidas	Greek	B.W.I	War journalist for Neologos (Constantinople).	Northern Greece	Among the first journalists to be given permission by the Greek Foreign Affairs Office to report from the war zone.
Herr, Albert	German	B.W.I & probably B.W.II	War photographer & journalist & cinematographer for Freiburg's Express Films Co.	Epirus & Macedonia in 1913 & Bulgaria.	Born in Kirchzarten, Germany, 3.4.1890. Died on 7.9.1943.
Schwobthaler, Robert Isidor	German	B.W.I & B.W.II	War photographer & journalist & cinematographer for Freiburg's Express Films Co.	Epirus & Macedonia in 1913 & Bulgaria.	Born in Endingen, Germany, in 1876. Died in Paris, 1934. See, also, an article in UCLA Library. He might be the creator of the known film taken in the Kresna Pass. More about him could be found in this informative article. The film can be seen in this youtube link.
Poulidis, Petros	Greek	B.W.I	War photographer	He was born at the village of Tseritsana (Laka Souli/Epirus) in 1885. Said to be "the first Greek -unofficial- war photographer.	In 1903, Petros Poulidis (a young man from Souli) was driven out of Constantinople, where he had been studying, and sought refuge in Athens. He brought with him a wooden box camera with plates, which he had bought in Constantinople in 1900. He worked in Athens as a photo-reporter. One of his most characteristic photographs is that of "Crown Prince Constantine at Souli [sic] before entering Ioannina, 21.2.1913", as he wrote on the back of the photograph. He died in Athens (;), on December 3, 1967.
Bogdanović, Đorđe Đoka	Serbian	B.W.II	War cinematographer	Shot footage on the Serbian front in July 1913.	Born 1860, Serbia. He set up Belgrade's first movie theatres in 1905. The experience of the First Balkan War led him to the idea of re-enacting Serbian victories for the camera. With the outbreak of the Second Balkan War, he was able to take real footage at the front, with which he made a number of short documentaries and newsreels. Bogdanović's newsreels from that conflict rank among the earliest cinematic recordings showing soldiers in action in real war situations.
Leune, Jean Victor Charles Edmond	French	B.W.I	War correspondent (grand reporter) and war photographer for L'Illustration (Paris), Excelsior (Paris), and Le Monde illustré (Paris).	Mid-October 1912 – May 1913, covered the fronts in Thessaly, Macedonia and Epirus	In 1913, Jean and Hélène Leune both contributed chapters to the book Dans les Balkans, 1912–1913: récits et visions de guerre, that describe their wartime expériences. The following year, Jean wrote Une revanche, une étape: avec les Grecs à Salonique par Athènes et la Macédoine, campagne de 1912.
Leune Vitivilia, Hélène	French, Greek from Constantinople	B.W.I	War correspondent for L'Illustration (Paris), Le Figaro (Paris), and Graecia magazine (Paris).	Mid-October 1912 – May 1913, covered the fronts in Thessaly, Macedonia and Epirus	In 1913, Jean and Hélène Leune both contributed chapters to the book Dans les Balkans, 1912–1913: récits et visions de guerre, that describe their wartime expériences. The following year, Jean wrote Une revanche, une étape: avec les Grecs à Salonique par Athènes et la Macédoine, campagne de 1912.
Puaux, Réné	French	B.W.I; B.W.II	Correspondent for Le Temps (Paris).	Covered Epirus and Albania, and Serres in July 1913	Born 1878, died 1937. Wrote The Sorrows of Epirus, (1918).
Trapmann, Albert Henry William (Captain)	English	B.W.I; B.W.II	Special correspondent, Military correspondent for The Daily Telegraph (London), the Daily Mail (London), The Daily News (London), and the New York American (New York).	Followed the Army of Epirus during the First Balkan War. Followed the Greek Army during the Second Balkan War. Was in Serres, July 1913,	Born 15 September 1876, London – Died 25 May 1933, Italy. Served as Captain in 25th County of London Cyclist Battalion, the London Regiment from 1 April 1908 – 3 July 1915. He was one of nine foreign journalists covering the war who co-signed a letter in July 1913 condemning the Bulgarian atrocities in Serres. He wrote "The Greeks Triumpant" (1915).
Labranche, Etienne	French	B.W.I	War correspondent and war photographer for Le Temps (Paris)	October 1912 – March 1913 & November 1913 – December 1913, covered the fronts in Thessaly, Macedonia, Epirus, the islands of northern Aegean, and Crete.	It has been supported that he wrote with this pseudonym, but was actually Stephane A. Vlastos.
Donohoe, Martin Henry	Irish, Australian	B.W.I	War correspondent for The Times (London).	Covered the Balkan War 1912–1913. Accompanied the Turkish army. Present at the Battles of Chorlu and Lule Burgas.	Born Galway, Ireland, 1869 – Died 1927. Emigrated to Australia in the early 1890s and entered journalism in 1892 with the Sydney Courier Australian.
Woods, Henry Charles	?	B.W.I; B.W.II	Correspondent for The Evening News.	Reported the Balkan Wars in 1912–1913	Born 1881 – Died 1939.
Baldwin, Herbert	?	B.W.I	War photographer for the Central News Agency (London).	Reported the 1912 Balkan War. He started following Turkish forces and was present during the Turkish retreat following Lule Burgas.	His account was published as A War Photographer in Thrace – An Account of Personal Experience During the Turco-Balkan War, 1912 (1913)
Baring, Maurice	English	B.W.I; B.W.II	The Balkan correspondent of The Times (London).	Covered the Balkan War 1912–1913	Born 1874, Mayfair, London – Died 1945. He was hired by the Times in 1912, and he was stationed in the Balkan unit the outbreak of World War I.
Ashmead-Bartlett, Ellis	English	B.W.I	Special correspondent for The Daily Telegraph (London).	Accompanied the Turkish Army in Thrace during the Battle of Lule Burgas (28 October to 3 November 1912) and the subsequent retreat on the lines of Chataldja (Çatalca)	Ellis wrote With the Turks in Thrace, (1913). Seabury accompanied him as his assistant and photographer.
Ashmead-Bartlett, Seabury	English	B.W.I	War photographer.	Accompanied the Turkish Army in Thrace during the Battle of Lule Burgas (28 October to 3 November 1912) and the subsequent retreat on the lines of Chataldja (Çatalca)	Ellis wrote With the Turks in Thrace, (1913). Seabury accompanied him as his assistant and photographer.
Bessantchi, M.	?	B.W.II	Correspondent for Zeit	Serres, July 1913	He was one of nine foreign journalists covering the war who co-signed a letter in July 1913 condemning the Bulgarian atrocities in Serres.
Bourchier, James David	Irish	B.W.I and B.W.II?	Correspondent for The Times (London)	War correspondent in the Balkans since the 1880s.	Born 18 December 1850, Baggotstown House, Bruff, Co. Limerick - Died 30 December 1920 Sofia, Bulgaria.
Bourdon, Georges	French	B.W.I	Correspondent for Le Figaro (Paris).	?	
Butler, C. S.	English	B.W.I	Correspondent for the Manchester Guardian (Manchester), and the Daily Mail (London).	Covered Macedonia and Epirus in 1912 and 1913	
Černov, Samson	Russian with French citizenship	B.W.I; B.W.II	Correspondent for Новое Время (Novoye Vremya) newspaper, St. Petersburg and Русское Слово (Russkoye Slovo) newspaper, St. Petersburg, special correspondent and war photographer for L'Illustration (Paris), war cinematographer	Arrived in Serbia in 1912 and covered the war.	Born 1887 – Died 1929. He made two short films about the war in 1913, "Једрене после заузећа" and "Битка на Брегалници" and in August 1913 organized an exhibition with 400-500 photos from the period of the Balkan wars in the Officers' House in Belgrade.
Donaldson, P.	?	B.W.II	Correspondent for Reuters (London)	Serres, July 1913	He was one of nine foreign journalists covering the war who co-signed a letter in July 1913 condemning the Bulgarian atrocities in Serres.
Ferriman, Frederick Zaccheus Duckett	English	B.W.II	Correspondent for the Manchester Guardian (Manchester).	?	Born 13 February 1856, Stamford Hill, Middlesex, United Kingdom, died 12 June 1934, Ashburton, New Zealand. Prolific author who wrote various books and articles about the region.
Grohmann, A.	?	B.W.II	Correspondent for the Frankfurter Zeitung (Frankfurt) and Neue Freie Presse (Vienna)	Serres, July 1913	He was one of nine foreign journalists covering the war who co-signed a letter in July 1913 condemning the Bulgarian atrocities in Serres.
Laporte, Bernard (or Lapporte)	French	B.W.II	Correspondent representing the New York Herald (New York).	?	
Larco, Renzo	?	B.W.II	Special envoy (envoyé extraordinaire) for Corriere della Sera (Milan).	Serres, July 1913	
Magrini, Luciano	Italian	B.W.I; B.W.II	Correspondent for Il Secolo (Milan).	Serres, July 1913	Born 2 January 1885, Trieste – Died Milan, 9 December 1957. During the 1912–1913 war he participated as a combatant in support of the Greek cause. He wrote Le isole, l'Albania e l'Epiro: maggio 1912 – giugno 1913: ristampa delle corrispondenze inviate al "Secolo" (Milano: Societa editoriale italiana, [1913]). He was one of nine foreign journalists covering the war who co-signed a letter in July 1913 condemning the Bulgarian atrocities in Serres.
Mavroudis	?	B.W.II	Correspondent for Débats (Paris).	?	
Crawfurd Price, Walter Harrington	English	B.W.I; B.W.II	Correspondent for The Times (London)	Thessaloniki during the war. Serres, July 1913	Born 1881, London – Died 1967. He was one of nine foreign journalists covering the war who co-signed a letter in July 1913 condemning the Bulgarian atrocities in Serres. He was stationed in the capital of Macedonia during the war. He wrote The Balkan cockpit: the political and military story of the Balkan wars in Macedonia (London: T. Werner Laurie, 1915), which was translated and published in Greek the same year.
Scott, Georges Bertin	French	B.W.I	War correspondent and illustrator for L'Illustration (Paris)	?	His illustrations appear in Dans les Balkans, 1912–1913: récits et visions de guerre / récits de Mme Hélène Leune et de MM. Gustave Cirilli, René Puaux; Gustave Babin, Georges Rémond, Capitaine de frégate Nel, Jean Leune, Alain de Penennrun (Paris: M. Imhaus et R. Chapelot, 1913)
Seminov	Russian	B.W.I	War correspondent for Новое Время (Novoye Vremya) newspaper, St. Petersburg.	Present in Filippiada, Epirus on 14 January 1913	
Tiano, P.	?	B.W.II	Correspondent for the Journal	Serres, July 1913	He was one of nine foreign journalists covering the war who co-signed a letter in July 1913 condemning the Bulgarian atrocities in Serres.
Tordoff, Vladimir	?	B.W.II	Correspondent for Outro Rossije (Moscow).	?	
Turbe	?	B.W.II	Correspondent for Agence Havas (Paris)	Serres, July 1913	He was one of nine foreign journalists covering the war who co-signed a letter in July 1913 condemning the Bulgarian atrocities in Serres.
Villiers, Frederic	English	B.W.I	War artist.	Covered the 1912 Balkan War	Born 1852, London – Died 1922. One of the pre-eminent war artist-correspondents of the Victorian era. From 1876 through World War I, Villiers covered more than twelve major conflicts and as many lesser ones.
Vlastos, Kostia	French	B.W.I	Journalist for Le Temps (Paris).	October 1912 – March 1913 & November 1913 – December 1913, covered the fronts in Thessaly, Macedonia, Epirus and the islands of northern Aegean.	He traveled with his brother Stephane A. Vlastos.
Bonsal, Stephen	American	B.W.I; B.W.II	War correspondent	Covered the Balkan Wars	Born 29 March 1865, Baltimore, Maryland – Died 8 June 1951.
Burleigh, Bennet	Scottish	B.W.I	War correspondent	Covered the 1912 Balkan conflict	Born 1840, Glasgow – Died June 1914, London. Also known as Bennet Graham Burley. He took part in the American Civil War on the Confederate side, and later became a celebrated war correspondent for The Daily Telegraph (London). He witnessed his last war while reporting the 1912 Balkan conflict, while he was in his seventies.
Machugh, Robert Joseph (Lieutenant-Colonel)	Scottish	B.W.I	War correspondent for The Daily Telegraph (London).	In 1912 he reported the Balkan War while accompanying the Serbian army.	Died 1925.
Nevinson, Henry Wood	English	B.W.I	War correspondent for the Manchester Guardian (Manchester).	He covered the Balkan War in 1912 from the Bulgarian side. Accompanied the Bulgarian army.	Born 1856, Leicester — Died 1941. Educated at Oxford. Covered the 1897 Greco-Turkish War, including the decisive Battle of Grimbovo.
Gibbs, Philip	English	B.W.I	Special correspondent/War correspondent for The Graphic (London) and the Daily Graphic (London), also drew sketches that were used by artists back in London.	Accompanied the Bulgarian army, present at the Battles of Lule Burgas and Kirk Kilisse, and the Siege of Adrianople.	Born 1877 – Died 1962. With fellow journalist Bernard Grant he co-authored The Balkan War: Adventures of War with Cross and Crescent (Boston: Small, Maynard and Company, [1913])
Grant, Horace	English	B.W.I	War photographer for the Daily Mirror (London).	Accompanied the Bulgarian army, present at the Battles of Lule Burgas and Kirk Kilisse, and the Siege of Adrianople.	Their photos appear in The Balkan War: Adventures of War with Cross and Crescent (Boston: Small, Maynard and Company, [1913])
Bussey	English	B.W.I	Special correspondent for the Westminster Gazette (London).	Accompanied the Bulgarian army.	Their photos appear in The Balkan War: Adventures of War with Cross and Crescent (Boston: Small, Maynard and Company, [1913])
Pryor, S. J.	English	B.W.I	Managing editor and correspondent for The Times (London).	Accompanied the Bulgarian army.	
Marinetti, Filippo Tommaso	Italian	B.W.I	War correspondent for L'Intransigeant (Paris).	Accompanied the Bulgarian army and witnessed the Siege of Adrianople.	Born 22 December 1876, Alexandria, Egypt – 2 December 1944, Bellagio, Italy. Italian poet and editor, the founder of the Futurist movement. Wrote Zang Tumb Tumb. Adrianopoli, Ottobre 1912 (Milan: Edizioni Futuriste de "Poesia," 1914). One of the most famous examples of words-in-freedom, Zang Tumb Tumb is Marinetti's dynamic expression of the siege of the Turkish city of Adrianople during the Balkan War of 1912. The title of the book elicits the sights and sounds of mechanized war—artillery shelling, bombs, and explosions.
Nodeau, Ludovic	?	B.W.I	Journalist for the Newe Freie Presse.	Accompanied the Bulgarian army.	
Phillips, Percival	?	B.W.I	Journalist	Accompanied the Bulgarian army.	
Zifferer (Dr.)	Italian	B.W.I	Journalist	Accompanied the Bulgarian army.	
Hands, Charles	?	B.W.I	Correspondent for the Daily Mail (London).	Accompanied the Bulgarian army.	
McGee, Frank	?	B.W.I	Correspondent for the Daily Mirror (London).	Accompanied the Bulgarian army.	
Osborn (Captain)	?	B.W.I	Correspondent for The Times (London).	Accompanied the Bulgarian army.	
Norregard	?	B.W.I	Correspondent for the Daily Mail (London).	Accompanied the Bulgarian army.	
Console, Victor	?	B.W.I	Correspondent for the London News Agency (London).	Accompanied the Bulgarian army.	
Grant, Bernard	English	B.W.I	Special photographer for the Daily Mirror (London).	Accompanied the Turkish army.	With fellow journalist Philip Gibbs he co-authored The Balkan War: Adventures of War with Cross and Crescent (Boston: Small, Maynard and Company, [1913])
James, Lionel	American ?	B.W.I	Correspondent for the Daily Chronicle (London).	Accompanied the Turkish army.	Published a book in Boston, titled With the Conquered Turk, Boston, 1913.
Price, Ward	?	B.W.I	War correspondent for the Daily Mail (London).	Accompanied the Turkish army.	
Wilkins, George Hubert	Australian	B.W.I	War cinematographer with Gaumont.	Accompanied the Turkish army during the First Balkan War. Reported on and photographed the fighting between Bulgaria and Turkey in Thrace and Macedonia in 1912.	Born 31 October 1888, Mount Bryan, South Australia, Australia – Died 30 November 1958, Framingham, Massachusetts, United States of America. He left his native Southern Australia in 1908 to work for Gaumont Film in London. During the First Balkan War, he was one of the first persons to take photographs from an aircraft and one of the first to take successful motion pictures of combat. He narrowly escaped being shot as a spy by the Bulgarians. He later won a reputation as a photographer in World War I and as a polar explorer.
Ostler, Allan	?	B.W.I	Lieutenant M.C. R.A.F. and correspondent for the Daily Express.	Accompanied the Turkish army.	Died on 16 October 1918.
McCullagh, Francis	?	B.W.I	Born in Omagn County (Northern Ireland) on April 30, 1874. Correspondent for the Westminster Gazette (London). Died in White Plains (New York/USA) on November 25, 1956.	Accompanied the Turkish army.	
Tower	?	B.W.I	Correspondent for The Daily News.	Accompanied the Turkish army.	
de Penennrun, Alain	French	B.W.I; B.W.II	Officer-correspondent for L'Illustration (Paris)	During the First Balkan War he followed the battles of Bulgarian troops in Thrace. During the Second Balkan War he moved to Skopje, Macedonia, where he witnessed the war, sent articles, photos and reports on the Serbian victory, and described the state of the Serbian army.	After the Second Balkan War, he published three editions of his collection of supplemented articles about the Balkans in 1912 and 1913, entitled 40 jours de guerre dans les Balkans. La Campagne Serbo-bulgare en juillet 1913 (Paris: Chapelot, 1914).
Sis, Vladimir	Czech	B.W.I	Correspondent for Národní listy (Prague)	Accompanied the Bulgarian army to the battlefields of Eastern Thrace, including Lozengrad, Catalca, Bunarhisar and others.	(Born 30 June 1889, Maršov – Died 2 July 1958, Leopoldov. He wrote From Bulgarian Battlefields (Prague: 1913) [Z bulharského bojiště: dojmy válečného zpravodaje / píše Vladimír Sís (V Praze: Český čtenář, 1913)]
Durham, Mary Edith	English	B.W.I	War correspondent	Accompanied the Bulgarian army to the battlefields of Eastern Thrace, including Lozengrad, Catalca, Bunarhisar and others.	Born 8 December 1863 – Died 15 November 1944. She became a confidante of the King of Montenegro, ran a hospital in Macedonia and, following the outbreak of the First Balkan War in 1912, became a war correspondent. Back in England, she was renowned as an expert on the region, writing the highly successful book High Albania and was an advocate for the people of the Balkans in British political life and society. She became known by the Albanians as "Mbretëresha e Malësoreve" – the "Queen of the Highlanders.
Service, Robert William	English-Canadian	B.W.I [ and B.W.II?]	War correspondent for the Toronto Star.	Active from 1912 to 1913 during the Balkan Wars.	Born 16 January 1874, Preston, Lancashire, England – Died 11 September 1958, Lancieux, France. Poet and writer also known as "the Bard of the Yukon."
Campbell, Cyril	?	?	Special correspondent for The Times (London).	Accompanied the Serbian army at the front.	He wrote The Balkan Wars Drama (New York: McBride, Nast & Co., 1913)
Wagner (Lieutenant)	?	B.W.I	Correspondent for the Reichspost (Vienna).	Accompanied the Bulgarian army.	
Otter, Frank	?	B.W.I	War correspondent for the Pink-'un (London).	Accompanied the Turkish Army in Thrace during the Battle of Lule Burgas (28 October to 3 November 1912) and the subsequent retreat on the lines of Chataldja (Çatalca)	
Fox, Sir Frank Ignatius	Australian	B.W.I	War correspondent for the Morning Post (London).	Followed the Balkan campaign in 1912-1913. Accompanied the Bulgarian Army through Turkey and covered the Balkan peace conference. Accompanied the Bulgarian army in Thrace, and was present at the Battles of Chatalja, Kirk Kilisse and Lule Burgas, and at the Siege of Adrianople.	Born 12 August 1874, Kensington, Adelaide, Australia – Died 4 March 1960, Chichester, England. Wrote The Balkan Peninsula (London: A. & C. Black, Ltd., 1915).
Trotsky, Leon	Russian, of Ukrainian Jewish origin	B.W.I; B.W.II	War correspondent for Kievskaya Mysl (Kiev).	He travelled to Serbia, Bulgaria, Romania in 1912–1913.	Born 7 November 1879, near Yelizavetgrad, Kherson Governorate, Russian Empire (now in Ukraine) – Died 21 August 1940, Coyoacán, DF, Mexico. Marxist revolutionary and theorist, Soviet politician, and the founder and first leader of the Red Army. His articles from the two Balkan Wars first appeared in book form as The Balkans and the Balkan Wars, Volume VI of his Sochinenia (Works) (1923: Soviet State Publishing House). Of his experience in the Balkans, Trotsky himself noted: "The years 1912–1913 gave me a close acquaintance with Serbia, Bulgaria, Romania – and with war. In many respects this was an important preparation not only for 1914, but for 1917 as well".
Cirilli, Gustave	?	B.W.I	Correspondent for Le Matin (Paris) and London Reuter News Agency (London).	He arrived in Adrianople a short time before the beginning of the siege to report on the war.	Wrote Journal du siège d'Andrinople impressions d'un assiégé (Paris: M. Imhaus et R. Chapelot, 1913).
Misirkov, Krste Petkov	Macedonian Bulgarian	B.W.I	War correspondent for the Moskovski Glas (Moscow).	When the First Balkan war was declared, Misirkov went to Macedonia as a Russian war correspondent and followed the military operations of the Bulgarian Army. He reported from the war zones and from Sofia.	Born 8 November 1874, Postol, Salonica Vilayet, Ottoman Empire (today Pella, Greece) – Died 26 July 1926, Sofia, Kingdom of Bulgaria (today Bulgaria). Philologist, Slavist, historian, ethnographer and publicist.
Mowrer, Paul Scott	American	B.W.I	Correspondent for the Chicago Daily News (Chicago).	Correspondent at the front during the First Balkan War.	Born 14 July 1887, Bloomington, Illinois, United States of America – Died 7 April 1971. He was the Paris correspondent for the Chicago Daily News beginning in 1910. He was a career journalist and later also became a poet.
Woodley, Haworth J.	English	B.W.I	Correspondent for the Central News Agency (London). An article of his appeared in La Tribune de Genève (Geneva).	Photographer and correspondent at the front during the First Balkan War.	Ex officer of the British Army. He presented a photographic album of the First Balkan War to Constantine, the king of Hellenes with the dedication "To H.M. King Constantine in token of my respect and admiration for the King-Strategist".
Hepp, Joseph	Hungarian	B.W.I	War cinematographer	Shot footage of the entrance of king George of Hellenes in Thessaloniki in October 1912.	Born 1887, in Budapest, Hungary.
Barby, Henry	French	B.W.I	Journalist and correspondent for Le Journal (Paris).	Accompanied the Serbian troops and was present at the battles of Kumanovo, Prilep, and Monastir. He was with the Serbians in the final assault upon Adrianople and witnessed the capture of the fortress.	Wrote the books Les Victoires serbes (Paris: Bernard Grasset, 1913) and Brégalnitsa. La guerre serbo-bulgare (Paris: Bernard Grasset, 1914).
Branger, Maurice-Louis	French	B.W.I	Photographer for Photopresse agency (Paris).	Went into the field during the First Balkan War in 1913.	Born 1874, Fontainebleau, France 1874 – Died 1950, Mantes la Jolie, France. Began working as a photographer in 1895 and around 1905 he created the photo agency "Photopresse" at 5 rue Cambon, Paris. Photographed the main events of Paris life (the flood of 1910, criminal affairs and trials, cultural and political life, sporting events). After returning from the Balkan Wars, he photographed World War I and its consequences for four years.
Palmer, Frederick	American	B.W.I	War correspondent for the New York Times (New York).	Reported on the 1912 Balkan War.	Born 29 January 1873 – Died 2 September 1958. Journalist and writer. Reported on wars for nearly fifty years, including the Greco-Turkish War of 1897, the Boxer Rebellion, the Boer War, the Russo-Japanese War.
Devine, Alexander	English	B.W.I	Special correspondent for the Daily Chronicle,(London).	Reported on the First Balkan War.	
Howell, Philip	English	B.W.I	Special correspondent for The Times,(London).	In the Christmas vacation of 1912, Howell was sent to Thrace, both by The Times and the War Office as a military observer attached to the Bulgarian Army of General Mihail Savov during the First Balkan War.	Born 7 December 1877 – Died 7 October 1916. British military officer and journalist. His observations from the First Balkan War were turned into a series of military lectures for the Staff College, and published as a book, The Campaign in Thrace 1912: Six Lectures (London: H. Rees, 1913).
Le Queux, William Tufnell	English	B.W.I	Correspondent for the Daily Mail (London)	Correspondent in 1912-13 during the First Balkan War.	Born 2 July 1864, London – Died 13 October 1927, Knokke, Belgium. Journalist and novelist.
Dis, Vladislav Petković	Serbian	B.W.I; B.W.II	War correspondent for the Serbian Army, conscripted as a journalist at the outbreak of the First Balkan War.	Covered front-line battles with the Serbian Army in the First Balkan War and Second Balkan War.	Born 1880, Zablaće, near Čačak, Serbia – Died 1917, on a boat on the Ionian Sea after being hit by a torpedo. Serbian poet.
Leighton, Bryan Baldwin Mawddwy (9th Baronet)	English	B.W.I	War correspondent and amateur film maker	Amateur film shot during his visit to Thrace between 27 October and 26 November 1912 records the aftermath of fighting between the Turks and Bulgars, including scenes at Lule Burgas and Chorlu.	Born 1868 – Died 1919.
Hare, James H. ″Jimmy″	English	B.W.I	War photographer for Collier's Weekly (United States)	Photographed the First Balkan War in 1912 and 1913	Born 3 October 1856, London – Died 24 June 1946. British photojournalist active between 1898-1931, covered five major wars.
Katopodis, B.	Greek	B.W.I	War correspondent for the Patris [Πατρίς in Greek] (Athens)	Eyewitness of the Battle of Nicopolis, near Preveza, O.S. 20.10.1912	Wrote several articles, as a war correspondent of the Greek newspaper Πατρίς.
Lauzanne, Stéphane	French	B.W.I	Special correspondents (correspondents spécials) for Le Matin (Paris)	Sent by the newspaper to Constantinople to cover the war.	Members of a large team of war correspondents sent by Le Matin to the different warring parties. In the War Correspondents Register of the Greek Foreign Affairs Office, Bronnaire is registered as Gabriel Bronnarie.
Vallier, Hubert	?	B.W.I	Special correspondents (correspondents spécials) for Le Matin (Paris)	Sent by the newspaper to the Bulgarian army headquarters to cover the war.	Members of a large team of war correspondents sent by Le Matin to the different warring parties. In the War Correspondents Register of the Greek Foreign Affairs Office, Bronnaire is registered as Gabriel Bronnarie.
Mathieu, Roger	?	B.W.I	Special correspondents (correspondents spécials) for Le Matin (Paris)	Sent by the newspaper to the Serbian army headquarters to cover the war.	Members of a large team of war correspondents sent by Le Matin to the different warring parties. In the War Correspondents Register of the Greek Foreign Affairs Office, Bronnaire is registered as Gabriel Bronnarie.
Cuinet, Alphonse	?	B.W.I	Special correspondents (correspondents spécials) for Le Matin (Paris)	Sent by the newspaper to the Turkish army headquarters to cover the war.	Members of a large team of war correspondents sent by Le Matin to the different warring parties. In the War Correspondents Register of the Greek Foreign Affairs Office, Bronnaire is registered as Gabriel Bronnarie.
Bronnaire, Gabriel	?	B.W.I	Special correspondents (correspondents spécials) for Le Matin (Paris)	Sent by the newspaper to the Greek army headquarters to cover the war.	Members of a large team of war correspondents sent by Le Matin to the different warring parties. In the War Correspondents Register of the Greek Foreign Affairs Office, Bronnaire is registered as Gabriel Bronnarie.
Zerbitz (capitaine)	?	B.W.I	Special correspondents (correspondents spécials) for Le Matin (Paris)	Sent by the newspaper to the Montenegro army headquarters to cover the war.	Members of a large team of war correspondents sent by Le Matin to the different warring parties. In the War Correspondents Register of the Greek Foreign Affairs Office, Bronnaire is registered as Gabriel Bronnarie.
Maschkov	?	B.W.I	Correspondant de guerre for Новое Время (Novoye Vremya) (St. Petersburg).	Witnessed the Siege of Adrianople.	Wrote Les atrocités des Bulgares en Thrace, par le comité de la défense nationale, septembre 1913.
Paget, Henry Marriott	English	B.W.I	Newspaper artist for the Sphere (London).	Covered the First Balkan War in 1912–1913.	Born 1856 – Died 1936. He was the only artist-correspondent on the scene when Nazim Pasha, the Chief of Staff of the military of the Ottoman Empire during the First Balkan War, was assassinated in Constantinople, making his rendering of the event the only pictorial record of the incident.
Sexé, Robert	French	B.W.I	War correspondent for the Daily Citizen	Sent in 1912 to cover the First Balkan War.	Born 17 November 1890, La Roche-sur-Yon, France – Died 1986, Poitiers, France.
Stevens, George John	English	B.W.I; B.W.II	Correspondent for the Daily Chronicle and The Daily Telegraph.	Journalist during the Balkan Wars in 1912-1913	Died 1917.
MacWhite, Michael	Irish	B.W.I	Correspondent	Journalist during the First Balkan War	Born 1889, Cork – Died 1958, Dublin.
Buxton, Noel	English	B.W.I	Correspondent	Journalist during the First Balkan War in the Bulgarian front.	Published the book With the Bulgarian Staff, New York, 1913.
Barella, Giulio	Italian	B.W.I	Correspondent	Journalists during the First Balkan War in the Montenegro front.	Published the book La guerra turco-balcanica vista e vissuta agli avamposti montenegrini, diario, Venezia, 1913.
Guarino, Eugenio	Italian	B.W.I	Correspondent	Journalists during the First Balkan War in the Montenegro front.	Published the book Nei Balcani durante la guerra, Milano, 1913. He, most likely, was the editor of the antifascist satirical magazine the Becco Giallo in the 1920s.
Mavrogordato, John Nicholas	English?	B.W.I	Correspondent for Westminster Gazette	Journalist during the First Balkan War with the Greek Army.	Born 1882 – died 1970. Son of Greek parents, but himself thoroughly anglicised. From November 1912 to April 1913 he was the correspondent of the Westminster Gazette in Greece, covering the Balkan wars. During the same period he served on the International Committee for the Relief of Turkish Refugees, set up in Salonica. Author of Letters from Greece Concerning the War of the Balkan Allies, 1912–1913, London, 1914 (M. Secker).
Ladopoulos, Kostas	Greek	B.W.I	War correspondent for the Empros [Εμπρός in Greek] (Athens)	An article about the ship hospital Albania appeared in O.S. 26.1.1913	Wrote some articles, as a war correspondent of the Greek newspaper Εμπρός.
Romaidis, Aristotelis	Greek	B.W.I	Photographer, based in Athens	Many photographs from the Greek front of the 1st Balkan War (1912–13).	Romaidis and Zeitz were well known photographers based in Athens and were too old to be in the war front.
Zeitz, Friedrich (Fritz)	German, working for a Greek photographer	B.W.I	War correspondent for the Berliner Illustrirte Zeitung (Berlin). War photographer, working for Romaidis in Athens	He mainly photographed the Greek front of the 1st Balkan War (1912–13).	Romaidis and Zeitz were well known photographers based in Athens and were too old to be in the war front.
Flora-Karavia, Thalia	Greek	B.W.I	Painter	She traveled to the war front in Epirus and sketched scenes of the second lines of the war and persons involved in the war.	Many of her sketches are based on photographs taken by Romaidis-Zeitz.
Miller, Sadie Kneller	American	B.W.I	Journalist and photographer for Leslie's Magazine.		She was born in Maryland and lived in Baltimore, USA.

== Photo gallery ==
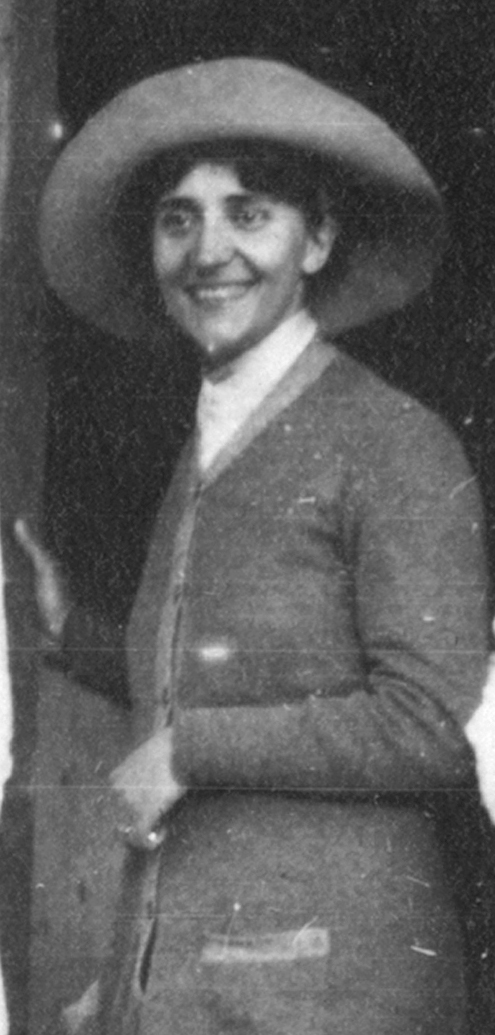
Hélène Vitivilia Leune in Filippiada, Epirus, Greece, December 1912, photograph from the archives of the Actia Nicopolis Foundation, Preveza.

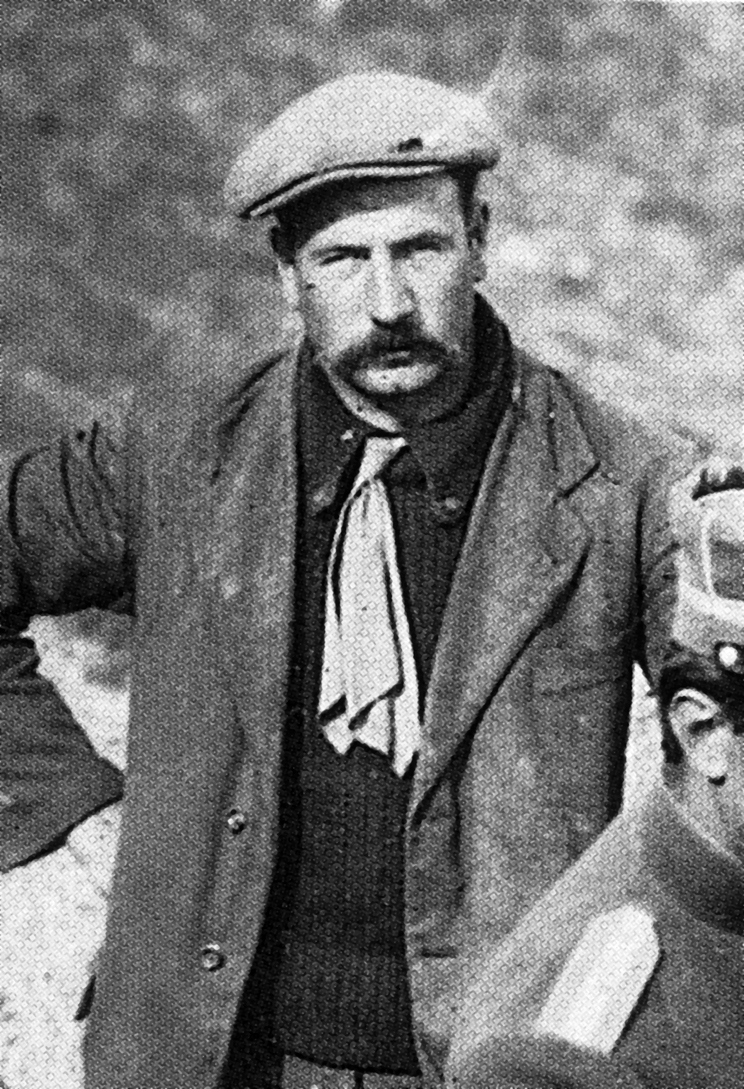
Jean Leune at Bizani, Greece, March 1913

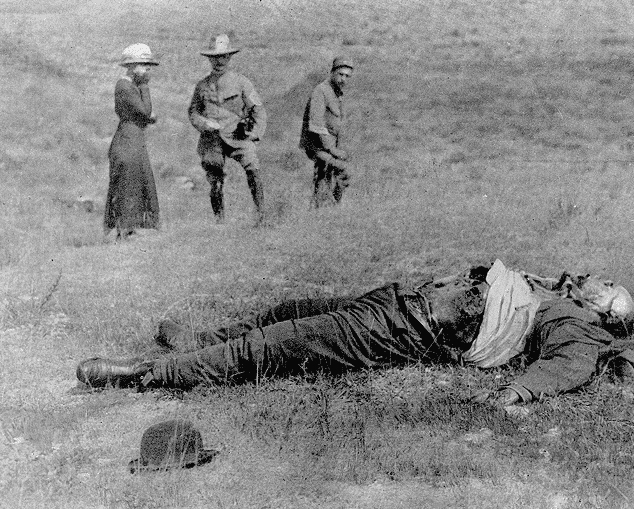
Mrs. Jean Leune and Mr. Georges Bourdon of Le Figaro, discover the corpses of seven notables of Serres, in the surroundings of Livounovo. Photo from L'Illustration, 2 August 1913.

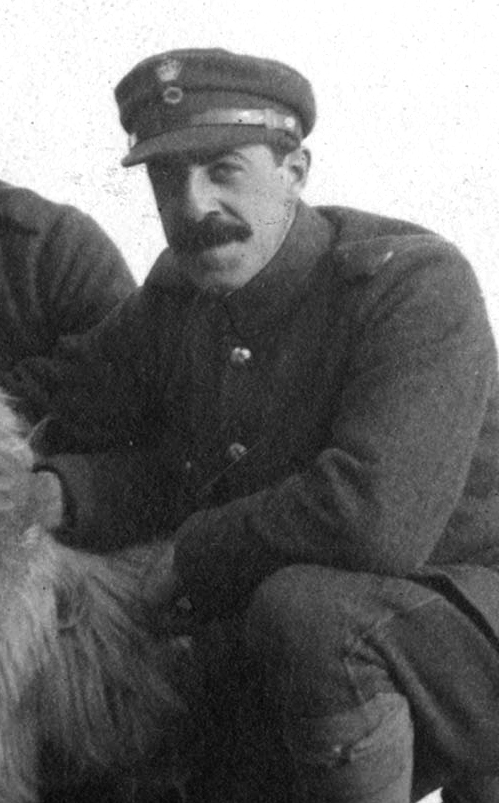
Kostia Vlastos, as Greek Army sergeant in Preveza, Greece, December 1912, photograph from the archives of the Actia Nicopolis Foundation, Preveza.

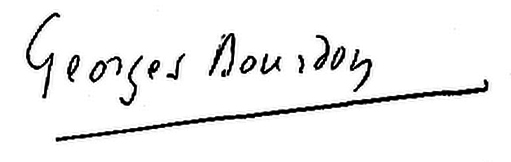
Signature of Georges Bourdon, appearing in L'Illustration, 2 August 1913.

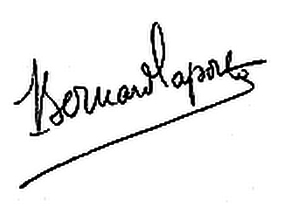
Signature of Bernard Laporte, appearing in L'Illustration, 2 August 1913.

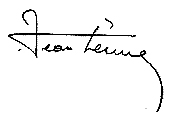
Signature of Jean Leune, appearing in L'Illustration, 2 August 1913.

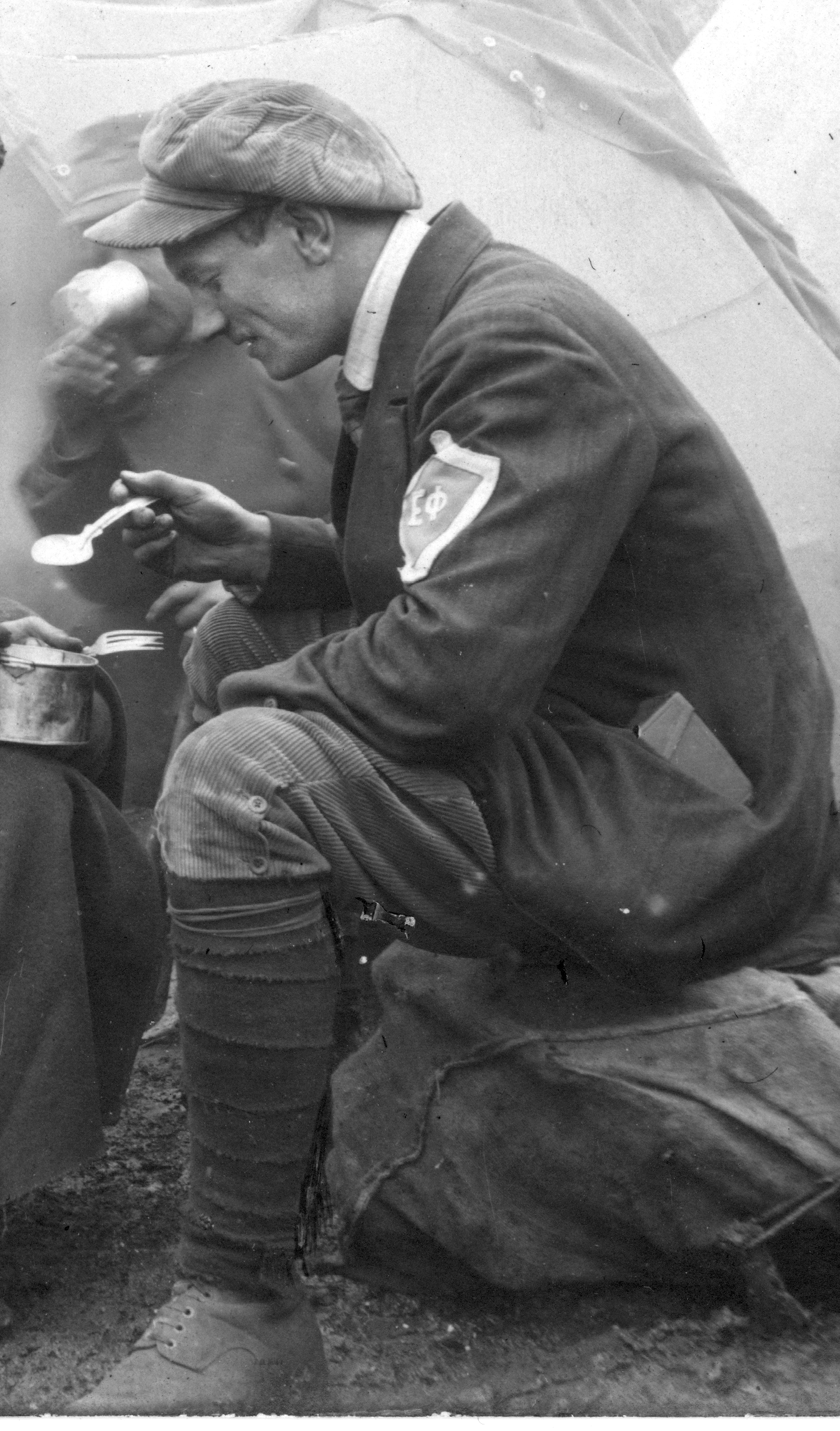
Unknown war correspondent of the First Balkan War, at the front of Epirus, Greece. January 1913. Photograph collection of Actia Nicopolis Foundation, Preveza, Greece.

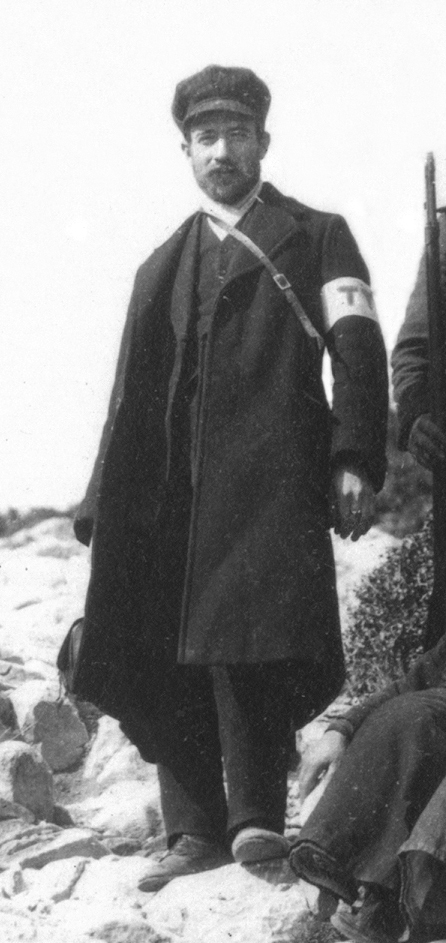
Unknown war correspondent of the First Balkan War, in the straights of Melouna, near Kozani, Greece. November 1912. Photograph collection of Actia Nicopolis Foundation, Preveza, Greece
