= Siege of Adrianople (1912–1913) =

Battle during the First Balkan War

Coordinates: 41.6744°N 26.5608°E

- Part of the Bulgarian front of the First Balkan War
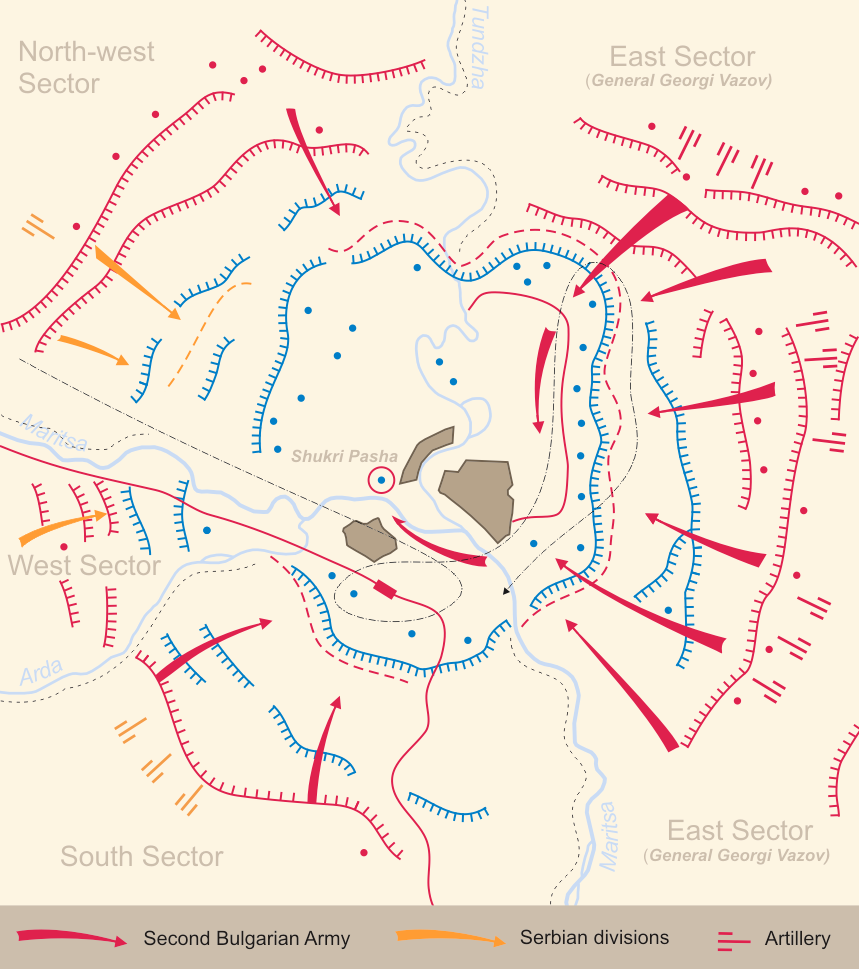
- Siege of Adrianople
Date	3 November 1912 – 26 March 1913 (4 months, 3 weeks and 2 days)
Location	Edirne District, Vilayet of Edirne, Ottoman Empire (present day Edirne, Turkey)
Result	Bulgarian-Serbian victory

Belligerents
Tsardom of Bulgaria; Kingdom of Serbia	Ottoman Empire

Commanders and leaders
(Tsardom of Bulgaria (1908–1946)) Nikola Ivanov (Tsardom of Bulgaria (1908–1946)) Georgi Vazov (Kingdom of Serbia) Stepa Stepanović	Abdullah Pasha (POW); Mehmed Şükrü Pasha (POW)

Strength
106,425 Bulgarians (424 guns); 47,275 Serbs (62 field guns, 34 howitzers)	60,000–75,000 (Bulgarian claims); 52,597 (340 guns)

Casualties and losses
Kingdom of Bulgaria: 7,953 casualties; 1,298 killed; 6,655 wounded; (Bulgarian claim): 16,577 casualties; 2,364 killed; 13,386 wounded; 827 missing (Turkish claim); Kingdom of Serbia: 2,370 casualties; 453 killed; 1,917 wounded	Bulgarian claims; 72,000 casualties; 7,000 killed and wounded; 65,000 soldiers, 15 generals, 2,000 officers; 600 artillery guns; 16 flags captured; Turkish claim; 55,500 casualties; 13,000 killed and wounded; 42,500 captured

The siege of Adrianople (Bulgarian: oбсада на Одрин, obsada na Odrin; Serbian: oпсада Једрена, opsada Jedrena; Turkish: Edirne kuşatması), was fought during the First Balkan War. The siege began on 3 November 1912 and ended on 26 March 1913 with the capture of Edirne (Adrianople) by the Bulgarian 2nd Army and the Serbian 2nd Army.

The loss of Edirne delivered the final decisive blow to the Ottoman army and brought the First Balkan War to an end. A treaty was signed in London on 30 May. The city was reoccupied and retained by the Ottomans during the Second Balkan War.

The victorious end of the siege was considered to be an enormous military success because the city's defenses had been carefully developed by leading German siege experts and called 'undefeatable'. The allies, after five months of siege and two bold night attacks, took the Ottoman stronghold.

The victors were under the overall command of Bulgarian General Nikola Ivanov while the commander of the Bulgarian forces on the eastern sector of the fortress was General Georgi Vazov, the brother of the famous Bulgarian writer Ivan Vazov and of General Vladimir Vazov.

The early use of an airplane for bombing took place during the siege; the Bulgarians dropped special hand grenades from one or more airplanes in an effort to cause panic among the Ottoman soldiers. Many young Bulgarian officers and professionals who took part in this decisive battle would later play important roles in Bulgarian politics, culture, commerce and industry.

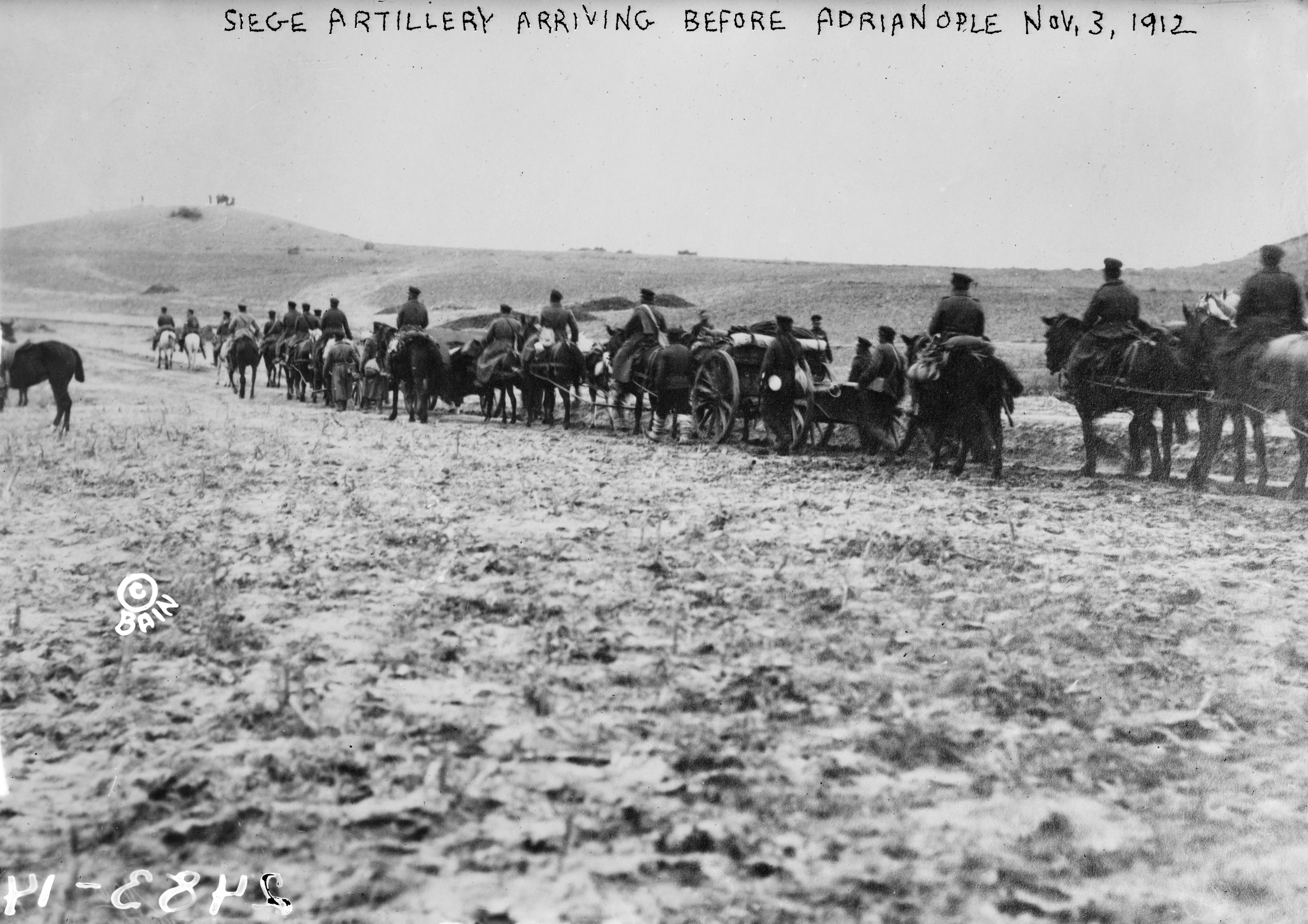
Siege artillery arriving before Adrianople, 3 November 1912.

Serbian artillery at siege.

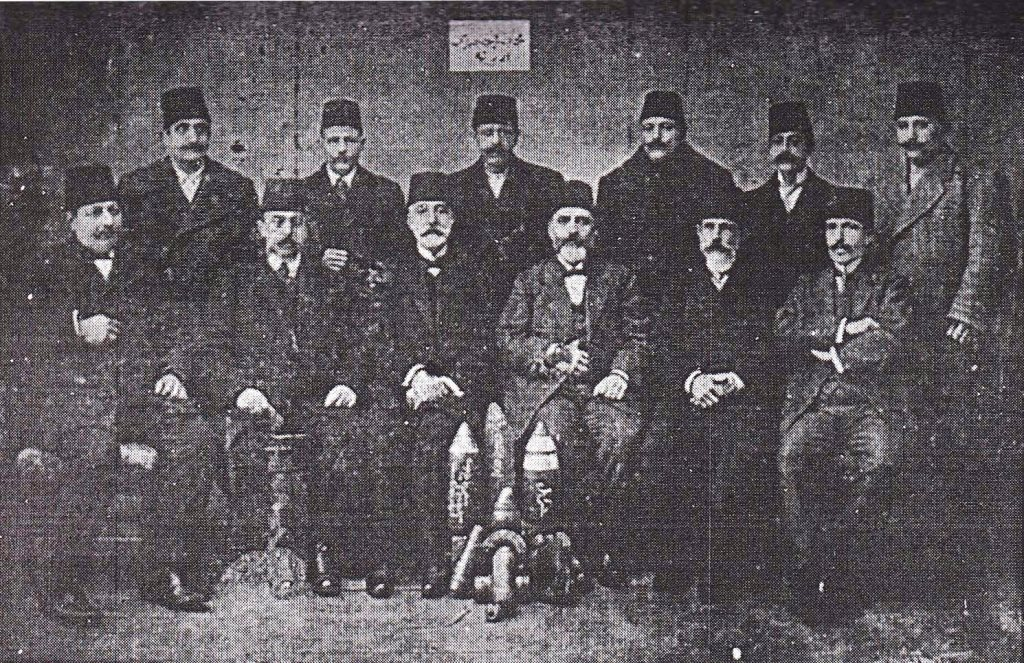
Edirne people living under siege, 1913

== Final battle ==
The final battle consisted of two night attacks. Preparations for the battle included covering all metal parts of the uniforms and weapons with tissue to avoid any shine or noise. The armies that took part in the siege were put under joint command, creating a prototype of a front. Some light artillery pieces towed by horses followed the advancing units, which played the role of infantry support guns. Attempts were made to perturb all Ottoman radio communications to isolate and demoralize the besieged troops. On 24 March 1913, the external fortifications began to be captured and the next night, the fortress itself fell into Bulgarian hands. Early in the morning on 26 March 1913, the commander of the fortress, Mehmed Şükrü Pasha, surrendered to the Bulgarian Army, which ended the siege.

After the surrender, large parts of the city, especially the houses of Muslims and Jews, were subjected to looting for three days. The perpetrators of the looting, however, are disputed, in that some accounts accuse the Bulgarian army of looting while other sources accuse the local Greek population.

The Bulgarian achievements in the war were summarized by a British war correspondent as follows: "A nation with a population of less than five million and a military budget of less than two million pounds per annum placed in the field within fourteen days of mobilization an army of 400,000 men, and in the course of four weeks moved that army over 160 miles in hostile territory, captured one fortress and invested another, fought and won two great battles against the available armed strength of a nation of twenty million inhabitants, and stopped only at the gates of the hostile capital. With the exception of the Japanese and Gurkhas, the Bulgarians alone of all troops go into battle with the fixed intention of killing at least one enemy." There were many journalists who reported on the siege of Adrianople; their accounts provide rich details about the siege.

Serbian units involved were the 2nd Army, under the command of General (later Vojvoda, equivalent to Field Marshal) Stepa Stepanović (two divisions and some support units) and heavy artillery (38 siege cannons and howitzers of 120 and 150 mm purchased from French Schneider-Canet factory in 1908); they had been dispatched because the Bulgarians lacked heavy artillery (though they were well supplied with Krupp-designed 75 mm field artillery).

== Arrival of Serbian forces ==
Serbian forces, commanded by General Stepa Stepanović, arrived on 6 November 1912. In Mustafa Pasha Place, a railway station outside Edirne, Stepanović immediately reported to the supreme commander, General Nikola Ivanov. The Serbian Second Army was formed from the Timok Division without the 14th Regiment, the Second Danube Division reinforced with the 4th Reserve Regiment, and the Second Drina Artillery Division. There was a total of 47,275 Serbian troops with 72 artillery guns, 4,142 horses and oxen and 3,046 cars.

Both Serbian divisions were immediately sent to the front. The Timok Division, strengthened by a Bulgarian regiment, occupied the north-western sector between Maritsa and Tundzha Rivers, its sector being 15 km long. The Danube Division occupied a 5 km stretch of the western sector between the Maritsa and Arda Rivers. A combined brigade was formed from the Timok Cavalry Regiment and the Bulgarian guard Cavalry Regiment to scout the Maritsa Valley.

== See also ==
- Zang Tumb Tumb, a poem about the battle, by Italian Futurist writer Filippo Tommaso Marinetti.

== Gallery ==
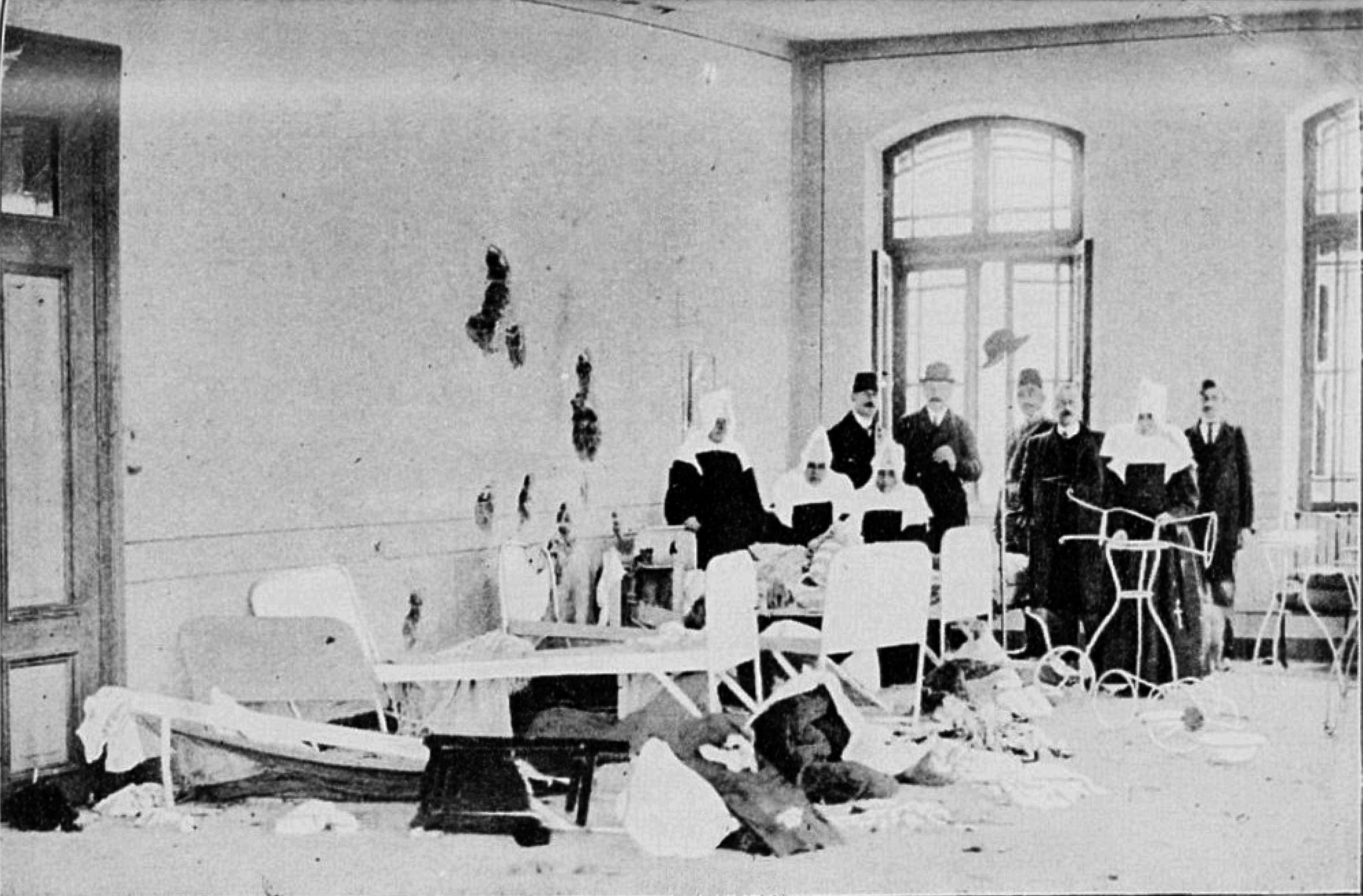
17 March 1912 Austria Consulate visiting Agram Nun's bombed residence at Adrianople

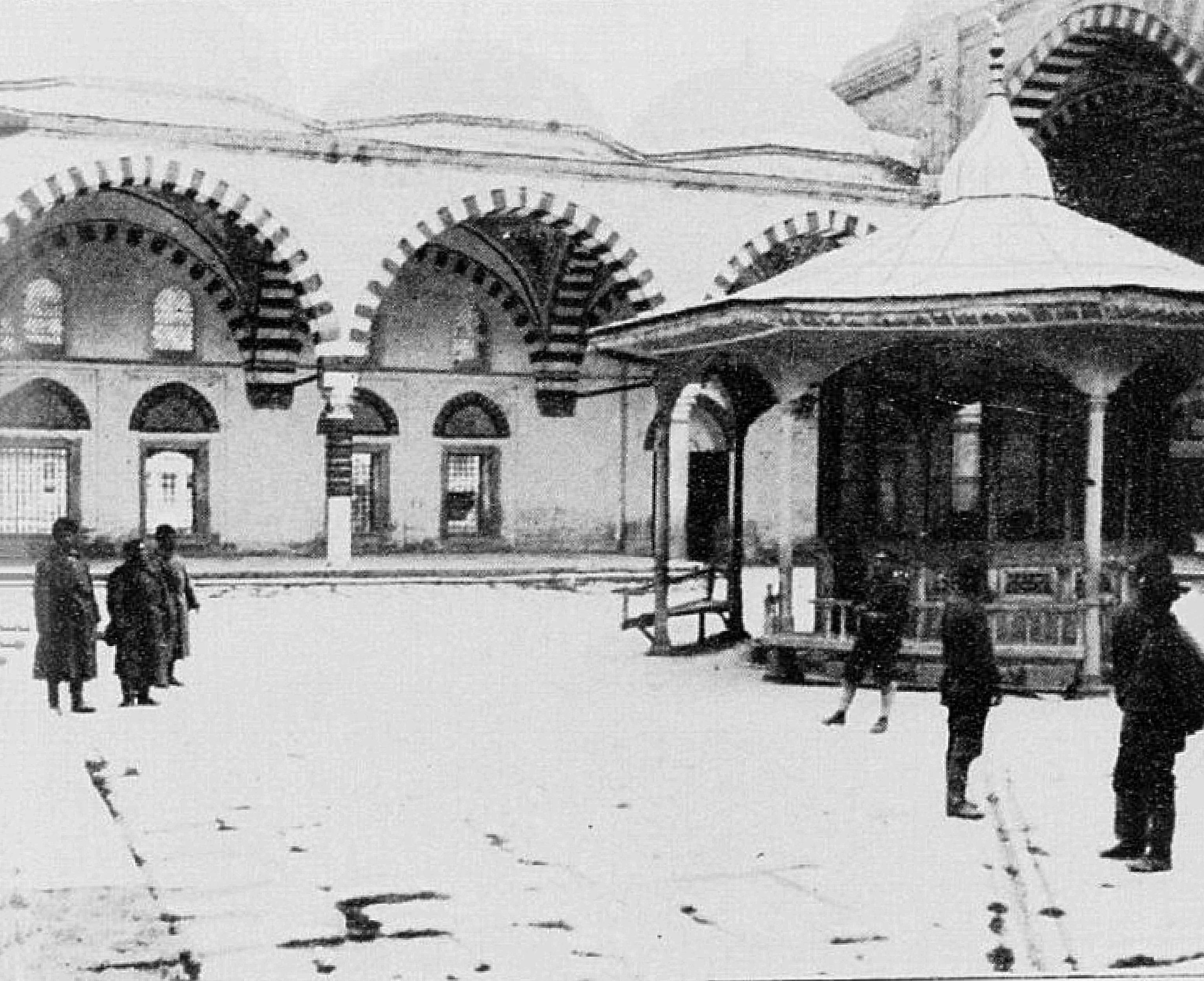
Bulgarian soldiers invaded Selimiye mosque

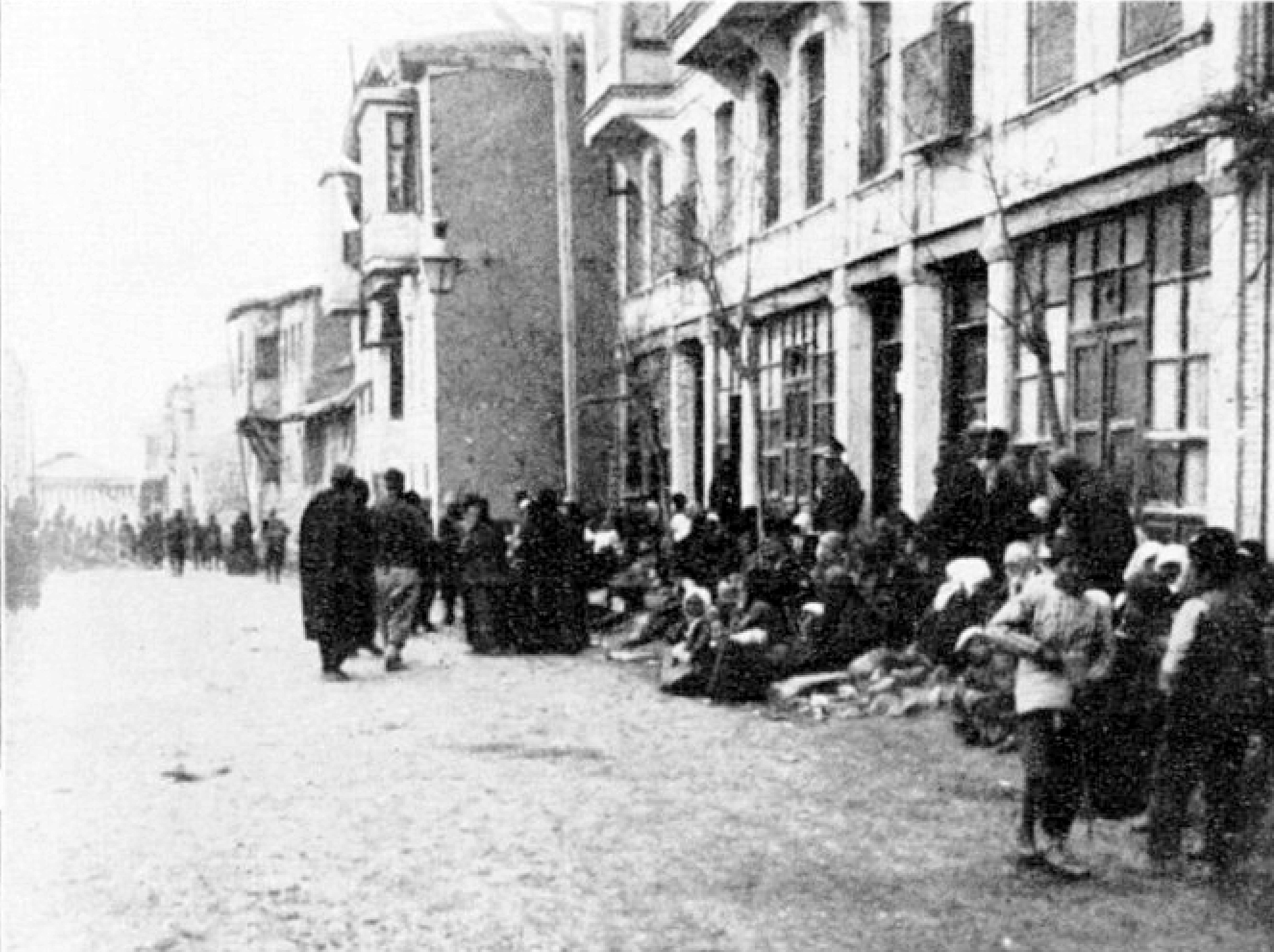
Bulgarian major's residence after conquering Adrianople

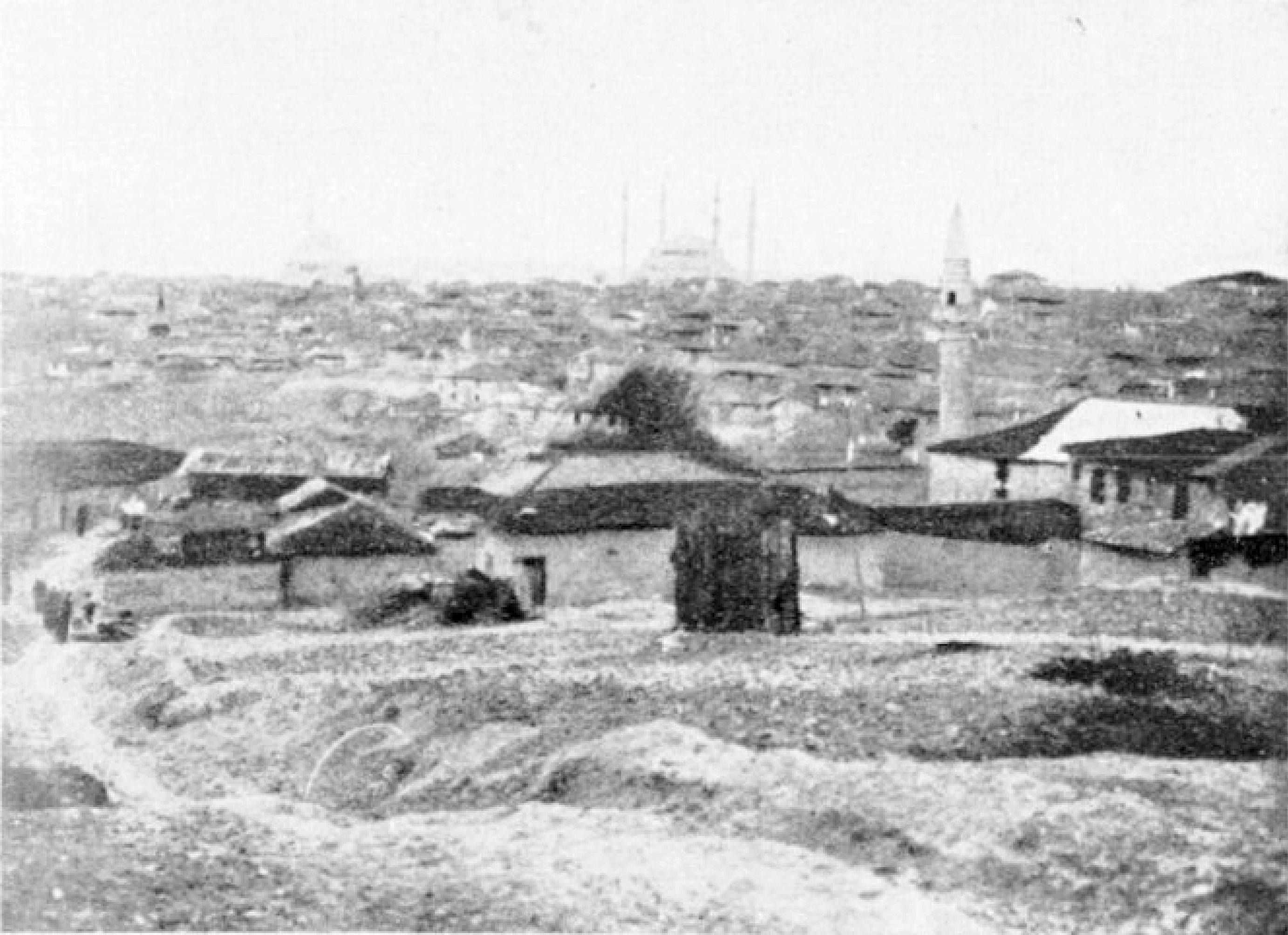
Adrianople view from Kirkkilise road

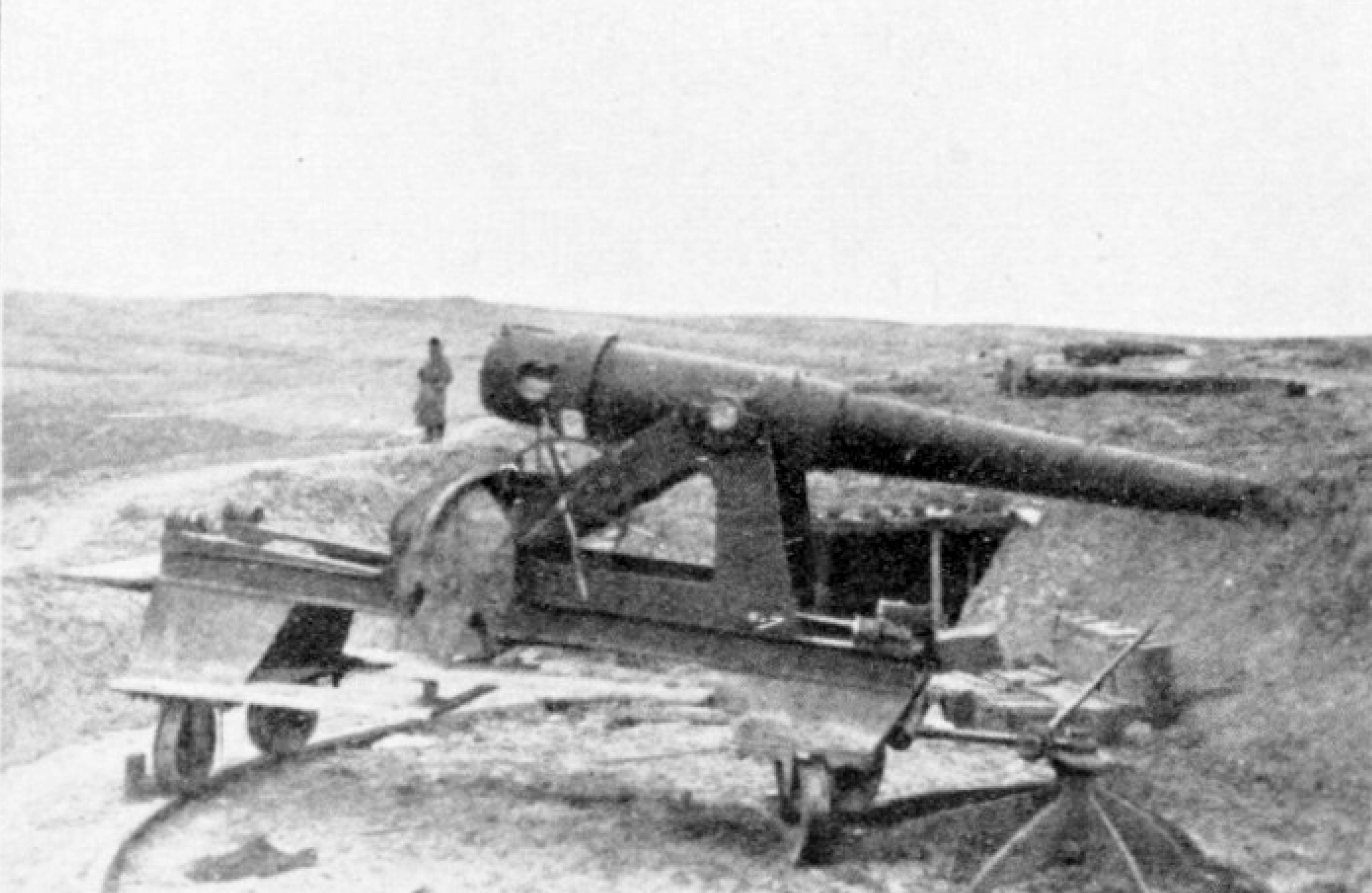
Captured Ottoman artillery (15 cm RK L/26)

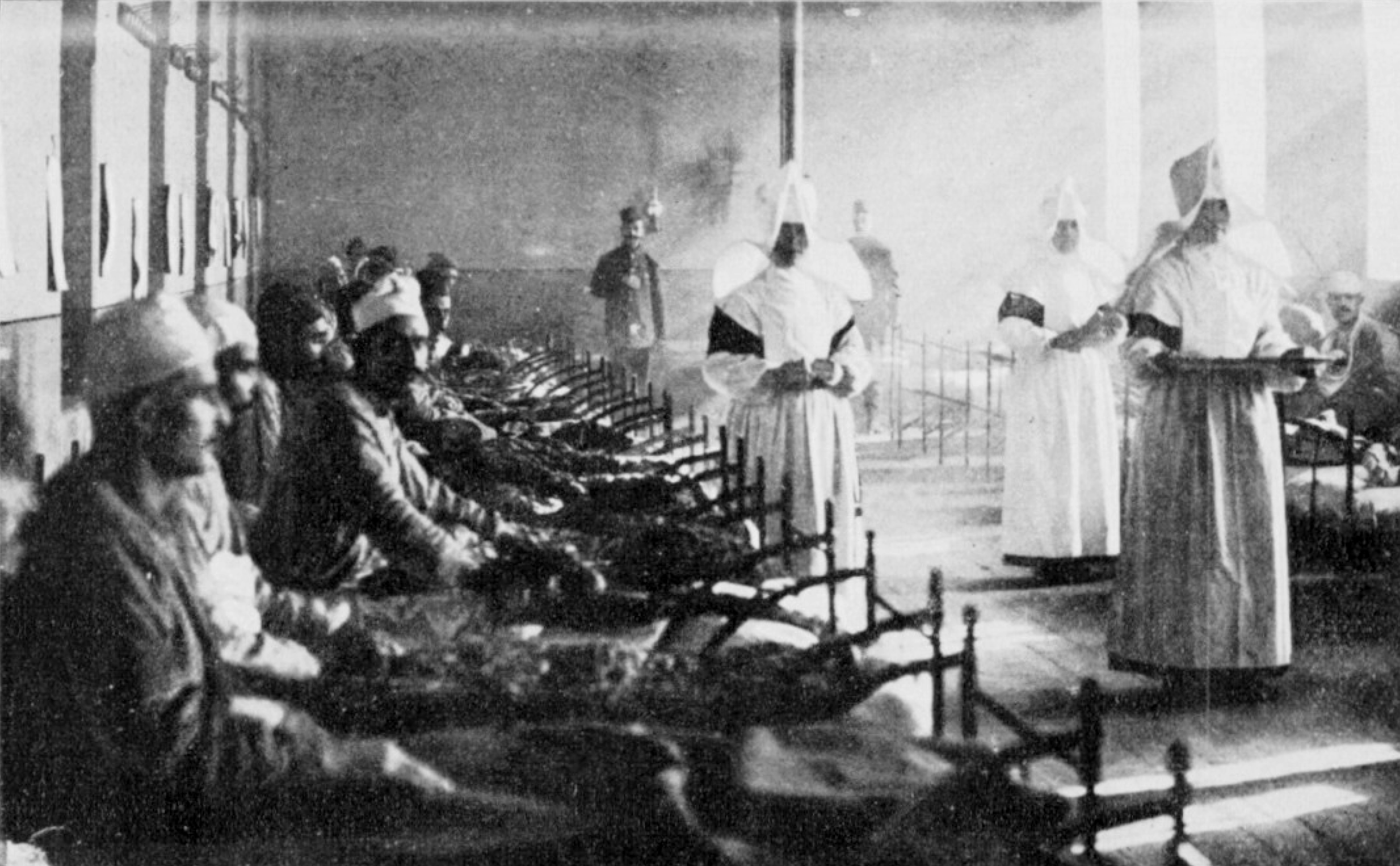
Agram nuns at Red Cross Hospital in Karaağaç

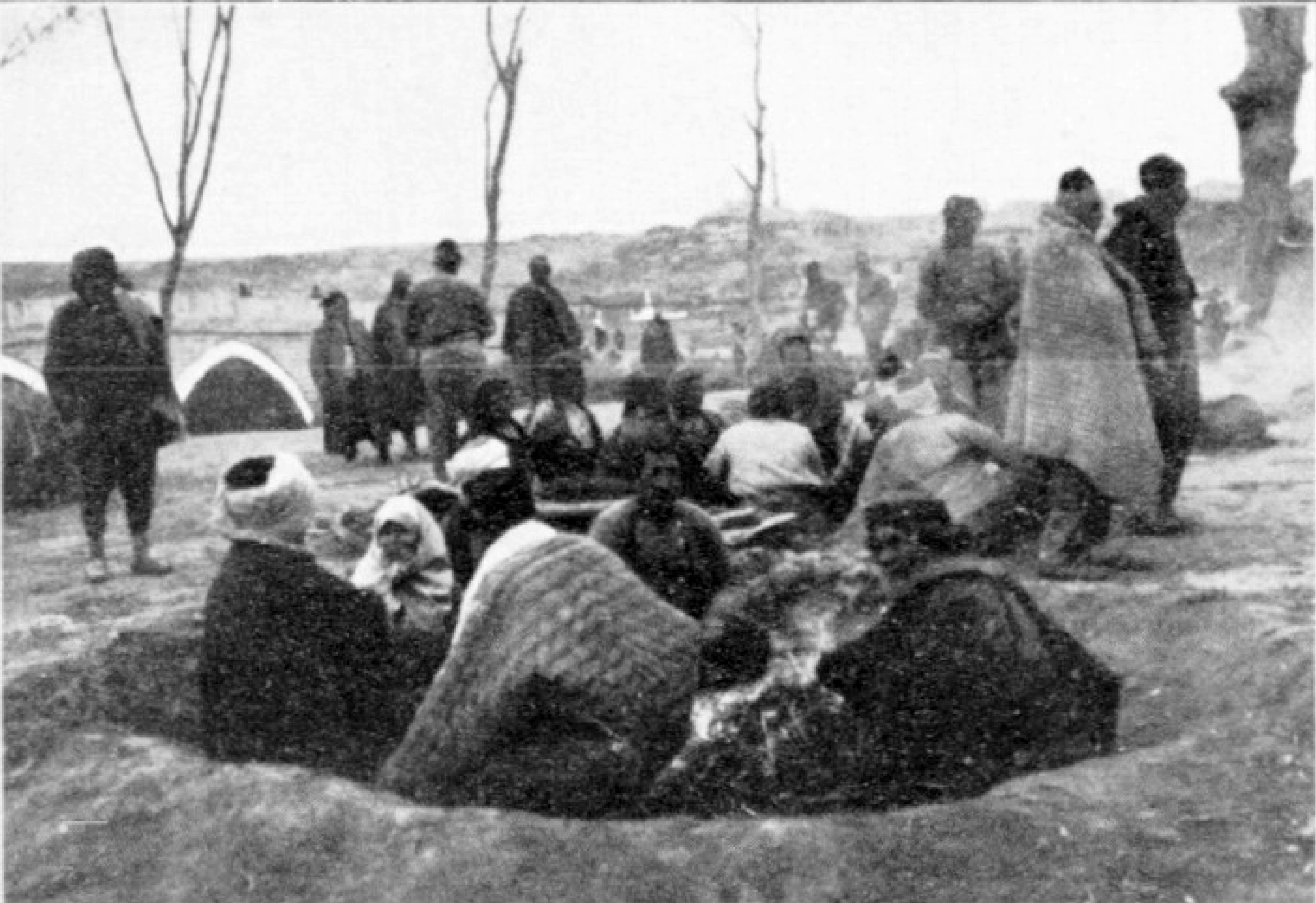
Prisoner camp near Tundzha River during cholera epidemic

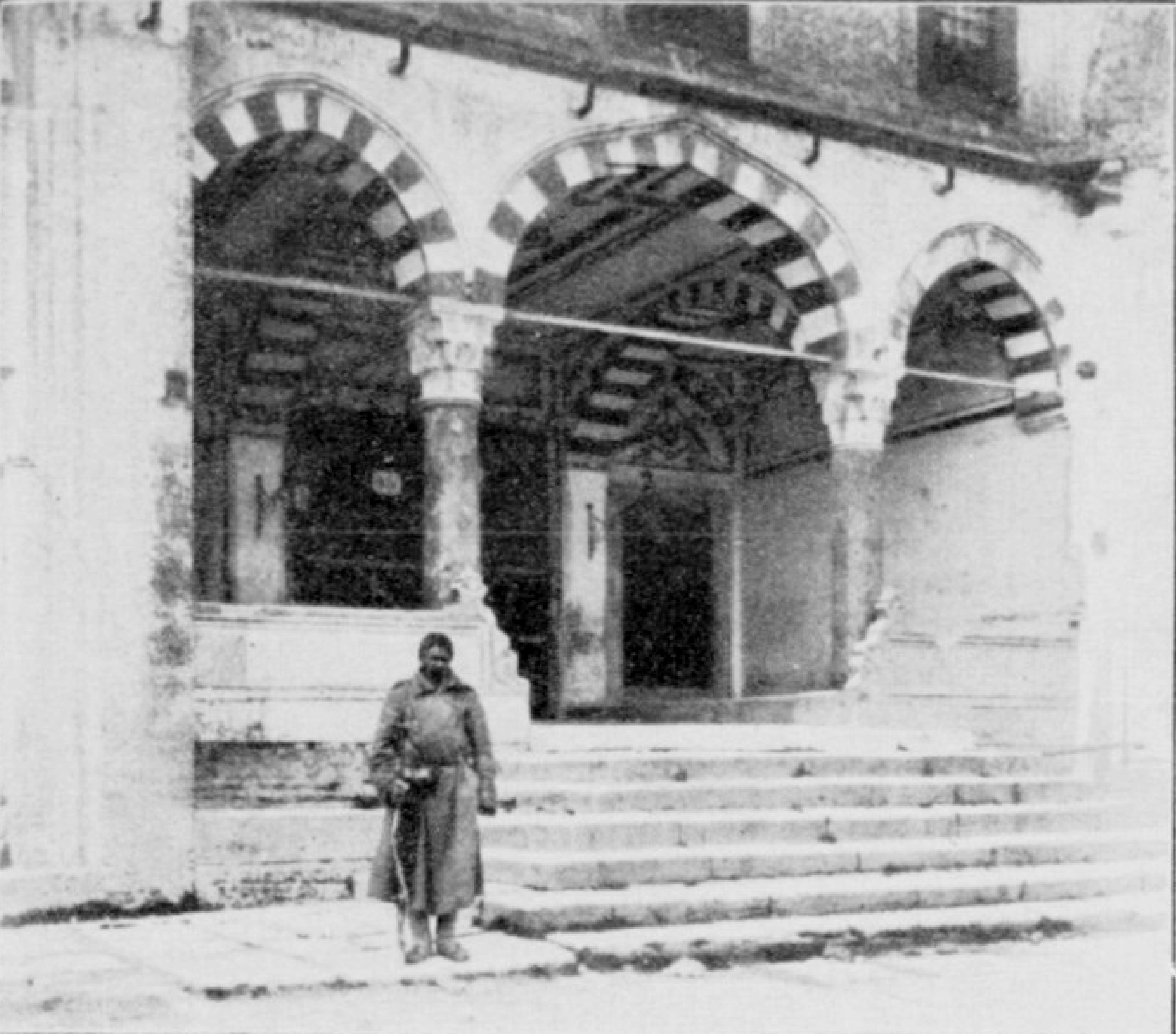
A Bulgarian soldier at the port of Selimiye mosque

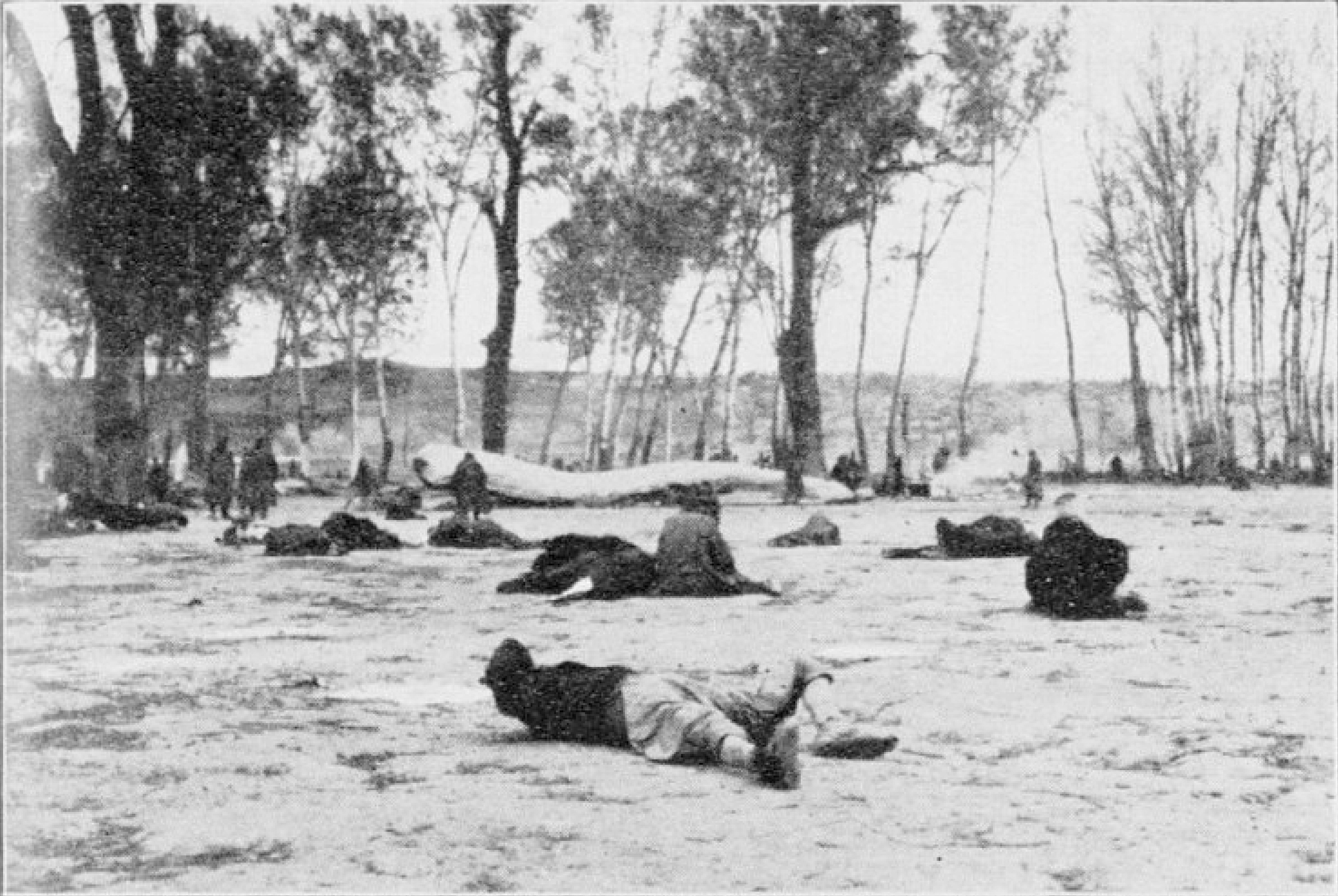
Cholera epidemic near Tundzha River

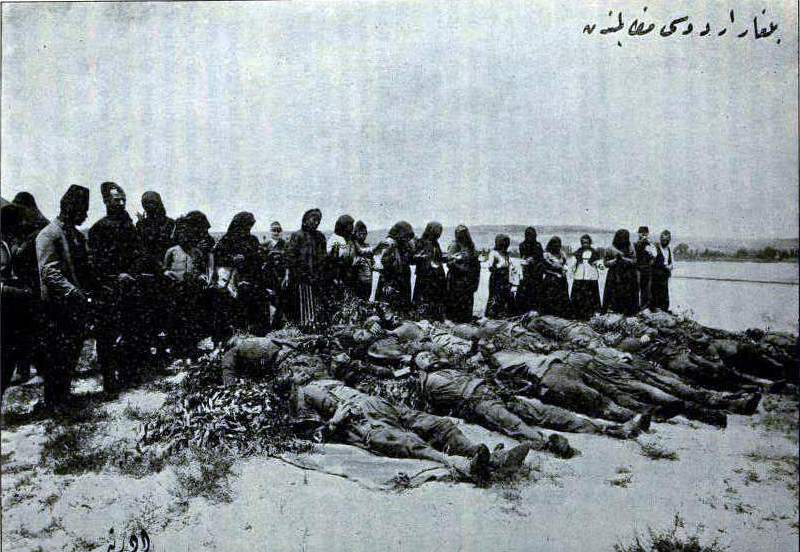
Victims thrown into the Arda and drowned

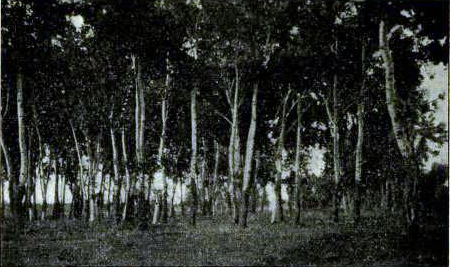
Isle of Tundzha trees stripped of bark which the prisoners ate

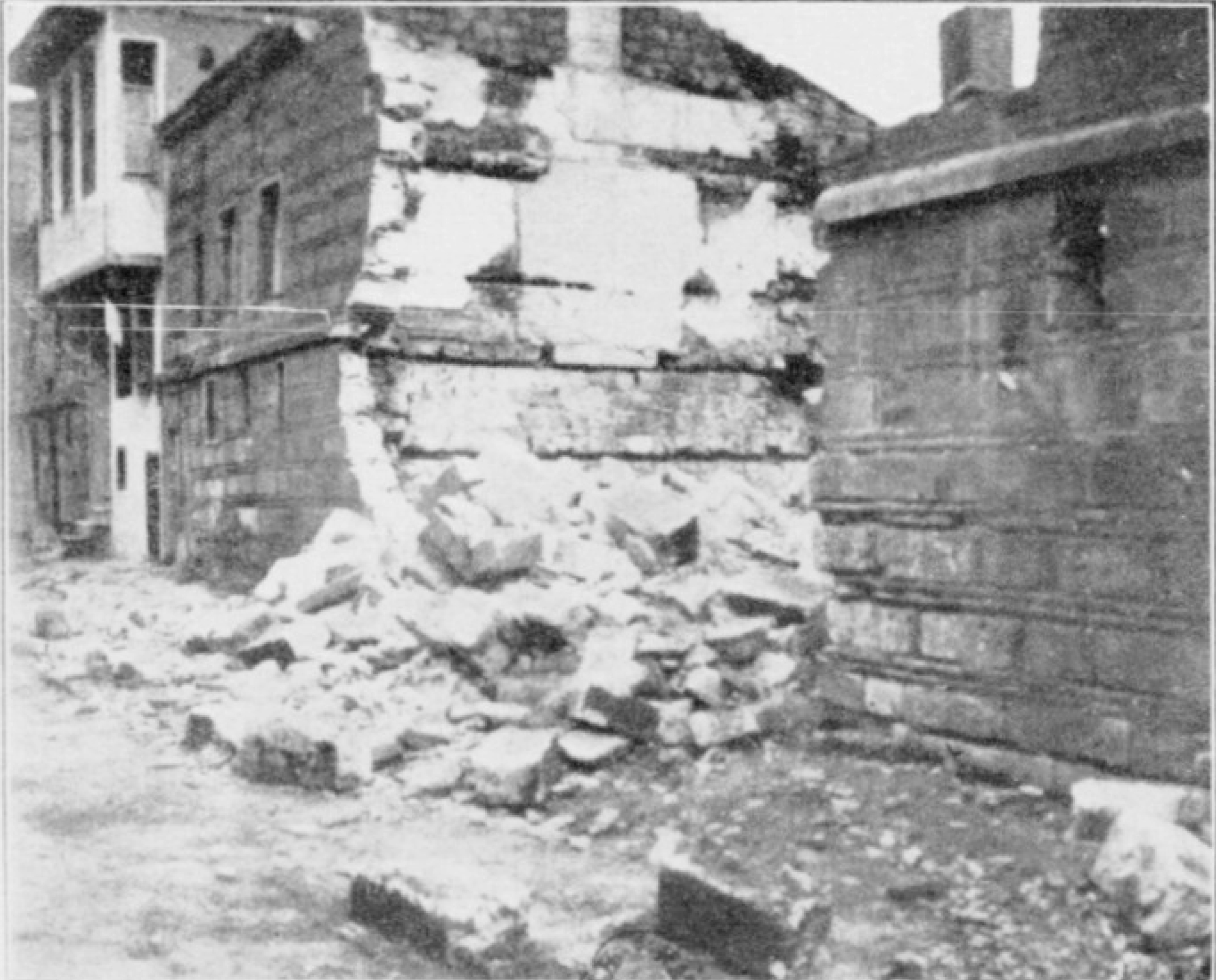
A bomb fell near Sultan Selim mosque

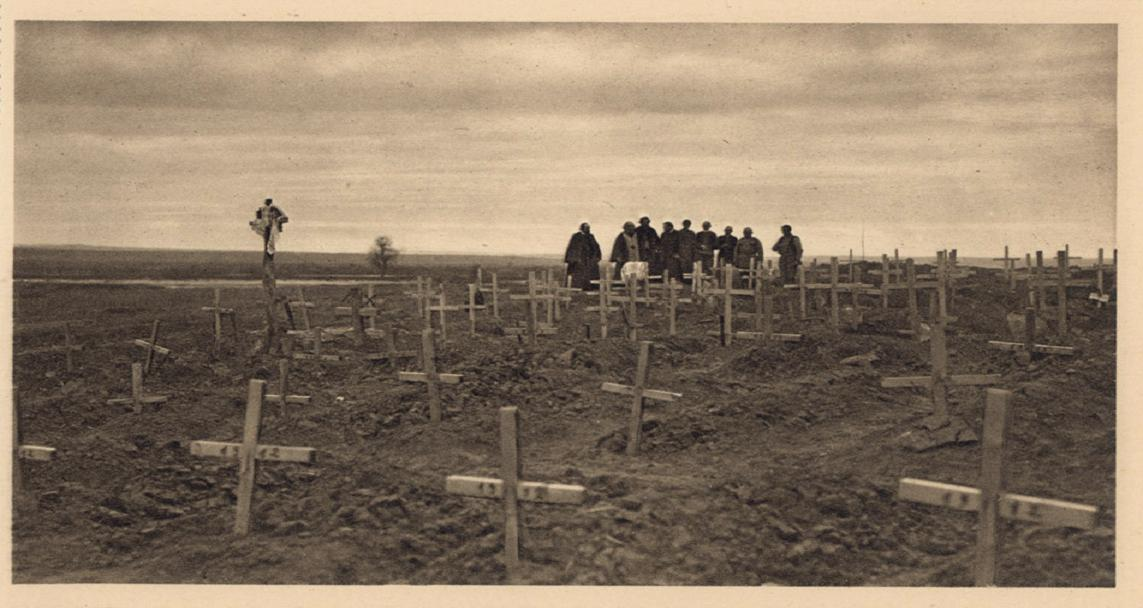
Cemetery of Serbian soldiers who died near Adrianople
