= Hélène Leune =

French writer, war correspondent, and nurse

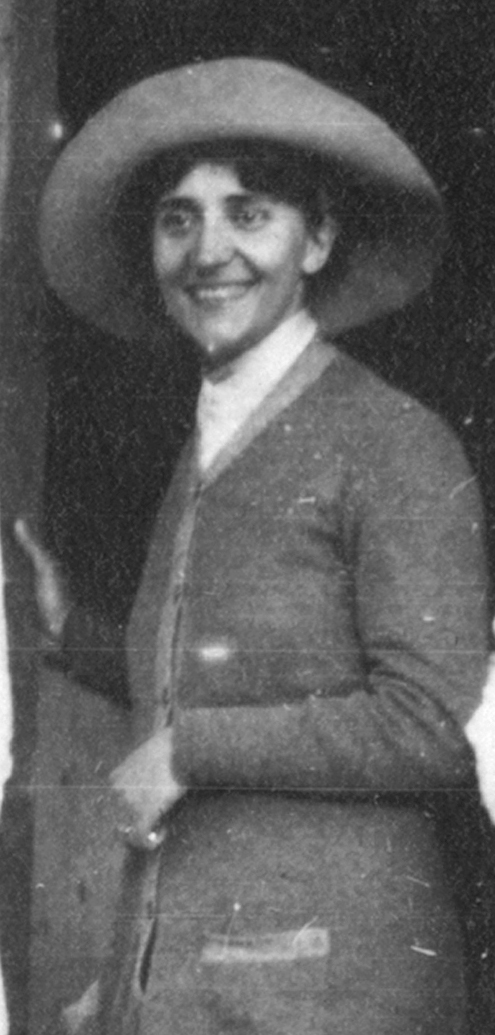
Hélène Vitivilia Leune in Filippiada, Epirus, Greece, December 1912, photograph from the archives of the Actia Nicopolis Foundation, Preveza.

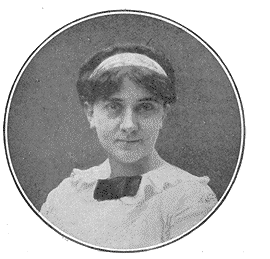
Hélène Vitivilia Leune, photograph from L'Illustration, August 1913

Hélène Vitivilia Leune (? in Constantinople – 18 May 1940 in Vitry-le-François), also known by the pen name Lène Candilly, was a French writer of Greek origin, traveler, war correspondent, and decorated Red Cross nurse.

== Early life ==
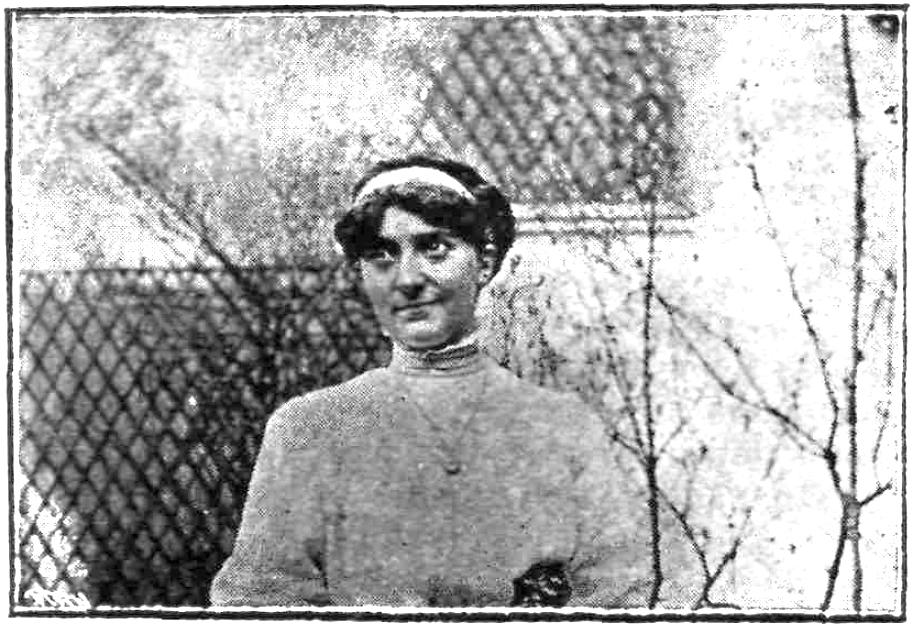
Hélène Vitivilia Leune in Athens, photograph from the magazine Πινακοθήκη, July 1911

Hélène Vitivilia was a Greek from Constantinople. She studied in the faculty of history at the Sorbonne in Paris and graduated in 1909. It was likely there that she met her future husband, Jean Victor Charles Edmond Leune, who graduated from the same faculty in 1912. On 7 February 1911, Vitivilia married Leune in Paris, at the townhall of the 16e arrondissement in Paris.

Leune was an intrepid traveler throughout her life. For example, she visited Athens and Kérassunde (Giresun), Turkey in 1911.

== War correspondent (First Balkan War) ==
Jean and Hélène Leune travelled to the Balkans where he was sent as a journalist (grand reporter) for the Parisian newspaper L'Illustration during the First Balkan War in 1912–1913. Hélène was also a correspondent for l'Illustration and le Figaro. She was cited in articles and books until 1919 as "Mrs. Leune," "Mrs. Jean Leune", or "Mrs. Hélène Leune." The couple arrived in Greece in mid-October 1912 to cover the imminent war. After temporarily residing in Athens, they left that city on 27 October for Larissa to follow the Greek Army. After the Greek Army took Thessaloniki, Hélène and her husband travelled to Preveza to follow the Army of Epirus. The Leunes arrived in Preveza on 24 November 1912. They accompanied the Greek Army in the field in different campaigns, and their many articles and photographs provide a vivid testament to the valor, horrors and hardship of that war from the perspective of both combatants and civilians.

The Leunes both contributed chapters to the book Dans les Balkans, 1912–1913 : récits et visions de guerre, that describe their wartime experiences.

Leune was a friend and compatriot of Eleftherios Venizelos.

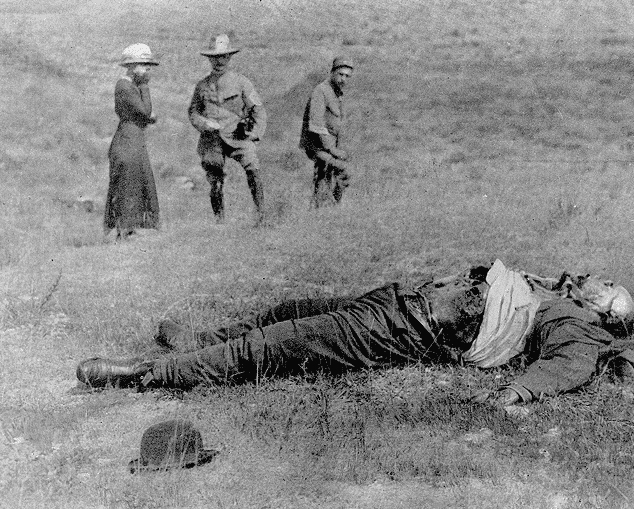
Mrs. Jean Leune and Mr. Georges Bourdon of Le Figaro, discover the corpses of seven notables of Serres, in the surroundings of Livounovo. Photo from L'Illustration, 2 August 1913.

== Red Cross nurse and author (World War I) ==
Leune served as a volunteer nurse with the Red Cross in France during World War I. She arrived in Cambrai at the French front on 6 August 1914, where she worked at the hospital on rue Léon-Gambetta. At the beginning of the hostilities, she was taken prisoner by the Germans and held in Cambrai for five months, after which she was taken through Lille and Aix-la-Chapelle to Switzerland, from where she returned to France She wrote a book about her experience, Tels qu'ils sont. Notes d'une infirmière de la Croix-Rouge, which was published in 1915.

Leune accompanied her husband to Greece a second time when he was sent to join the Corps expéditionnaire d'Orient as a captain-pilot during World War I. She served as a nurse in the hospitals of Thessaloniki and Moudros (at the latter, she cared for French soldiers suffering from typhus). In recognition of her great devotion to duty in those hospitals, she received both the Croix de Guerre and the Médaille des Épidémies (argent). She was attached to the French mission in Serbia and then at Thessaloniki.

Jean and Hélène had a daughter, Irène, born in Thessaloniki in 1917. In 1942, Irène Leune married baron Alfred Testot-Ferry (1914–1947), aviator and member of the French Resistance. Irène became one of the first women race car drivers using the pseudonym "Irène Terray," and she won many rally competitions during the 1950s (e.g. Coupe des Dames à Liège–Rome–Liège, Monte-Carlo Rally).

Hélène and Jean Leune appeared to have divorced in early 1920s, since Leune married his second wife, Germaine Berthe Emilie Fougères, on 3 November 192[3?].

== Speaker and author (interwar period) ==
After returning to France, Leune worked for two years as the secretary of French novelist Paul Bourget, apparently sometime between 1919 and 1926.

Between 1914 and 1933, Leune spoke at conferences and radio broadcasts about her wartime and travel experiences, Greece, French culture, and the arts. Contemporary reports described her as an effective public speaker.

Starting from 1920, Leune published and spoke under the pseudonym of Lène Candilly, under which she wrote for the newspapers L'Illustration, Le Figaro, and Le Gaulois. From 1920 onwards, she was referred to as "Lène Candilly", "Mme H. Lène-Candilly,""H. de Candilly," "Lenne-Candilly," and "Lënne Candilly."

In the 1920s (until at least 1928), she promoted France as an Alliance Française speaker at chapters both within France as well as abroad (including Belgrade, Bucharest, Athens, England, and Egypt). The Alliance Française sent her on a mission to Greece, Turkey, Serbia and Romania. In February 1924 she travelled from Constanța, Romania to Constantinople, Thessaloniki, and Pireaus.

In May 1927, Leune was sent to Greece as a correspondent for Le Figaro, and Le Gaulois to attend the Delphic festival, which was organized under the patronage of the Greek poet Angelos Sikelianos and his wife Eva Palmer-Sikelianos. At Delphi, she attended representations of the tragedy Prometheus Bound and performances of ancient dances.

== Red Cross nurse (World War II) ==
Leune served again as a nurse with the Red Cross in World War II. In response to the German invasion of Poland, France declared war on Germany on 3 September 1939 and invaded its western territory, Saarland, with the Saar Offensive. In September 1939 she was assigned to a hospital train, on which she worked until 15 May 1940, when she was transferred to a new assignment with the surgical ambulances at Vitry-le-François (Marne), France. On 10 May 1940, Germany began its invasion of the Low Countries and France in what became known as the Battle of France. Leune died in Vitry-le-François during the bombardment that took place on 18 May 1940.

== Bibliography ==
=== Books ===
- Dans les Balkans, 1912–1913 : récits et visions de guerre / récits de Mme Hélène Leune et de MM. Gustave Cirilli, René Puaux; Gustave Babin, Georges Rémond, Capitaine de frégate Nel, Jean Leune, Alain de Penennrun (Paris: M. Imhaus et R. Chapelot, 1913)
- Tels qu'ils sont. Notes d'une infirmière de la Croix-Rouge (Paris: Larousse, 1915)

=== Selected articles ===
- "La "Filleule" de l'Armée Grecque: Notes de Victoire de Mme. Jean Leune." L'Illustration (Paris), No. 3675, 2 Août 1913.
- “En Macédoine libérée (Carnet de route).” La Nouvelle revue (Paris), 1 Janvier 1914, No. 41, pp. 69–89.
- "L'Asie Mineure et l’Hellénisme.” Bulletin de la Société de géographie et d'études coloniales de Marseille (Marseille), 1920, tome 42, p 66.
- “Souvenir de Voyage en Anatolie." Revue politique et littéraire: Revue bleue (Paris), 1922, No. 1, p. 245-248.
- "Impressions de voyage en Turquie et en Grèce." Bulletin de la Société de géographie de Lille (France), 1925 avril-may-juin, No. 2, pp 77–79.

== Speaking engagements ==
- 18 March 1914 to the Société de géographie in Paris.
- 6 December 1919 to the Société de géographie commerciale de Paris
- 29 December 1919 to the Société de géographie de Marseille.
- 28 April 1920 to Ligue de l'enseignement in Paris.
- 11 and 13 December 1924, radio broadcasts in Paris on the station "radiotélégraphique de la Ecole supérieure des P.T.T."
- 26 December 1924 to the Société de géographie in Paris.
- 15 January 1925 to the Société de géographie de Lille.
- 1 February 1925, to the Union des femmes de France (Red Cross) in Paris.
- 2 February 1925 at the salle de l'Olympia in Cannes.
- 24 and 30 April 1925 to the Société de géographie commerciale de Paris.
- 7 and 14 December 1925, to the Institut catholique de Paris.
- 4 January 1926 to the Société de Géographie de Rochefort.
- 18 February 1926 to the Société de géographie de Lille.
- April–June 1926 to l'Union de conférenciers français in Paris
- 11 December 1926 to the Alliance Française at Le Mans.
- 21 December 1927 to the Société de Géographie de Rochefort.
- 26 February 1928, to the Société de géographie de Toulouse.
- 27 April 1928 to the Société de géographie in Paris.
- 16 November 1928 to the Université de Neuchâtel.
- 29 November 1928 to the Alliance Française at Le Mans
- 8 and 15 December 1928, to the Institut catholique de Paris.
- 10 February 1933 to the Académie de Versailles.
