= Jean Leune =

French war correspondent and military officer

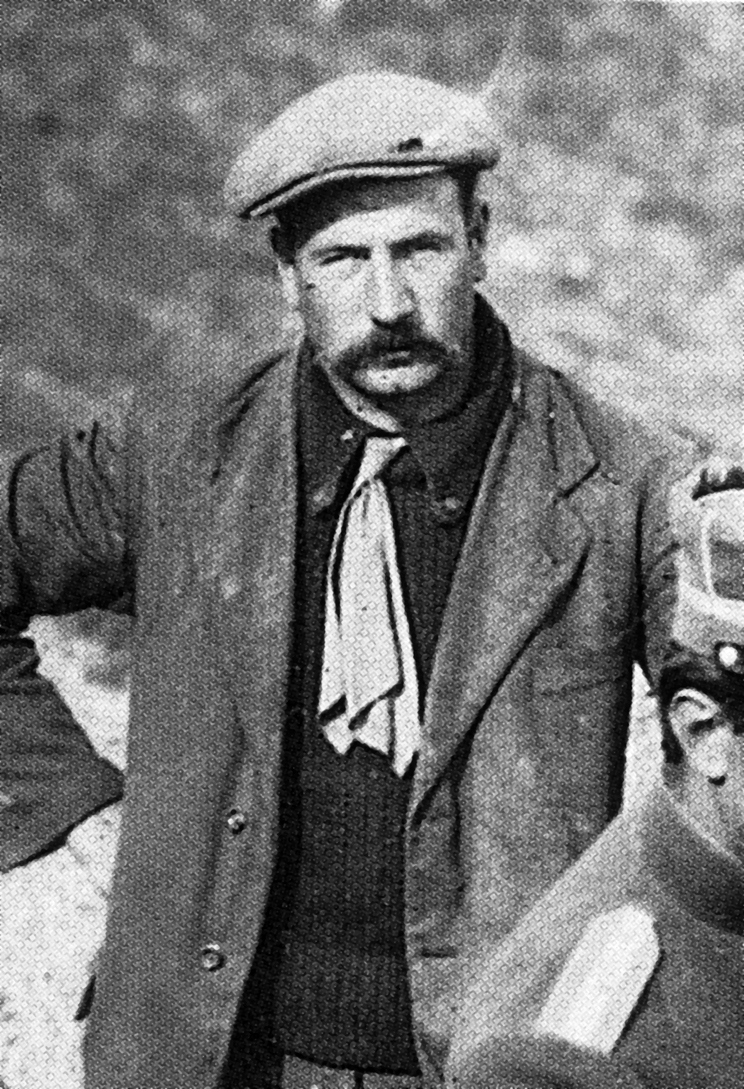
Jean Leune at Bizani, Greece, March 1913.

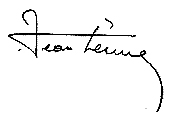
Jean Leune's signature

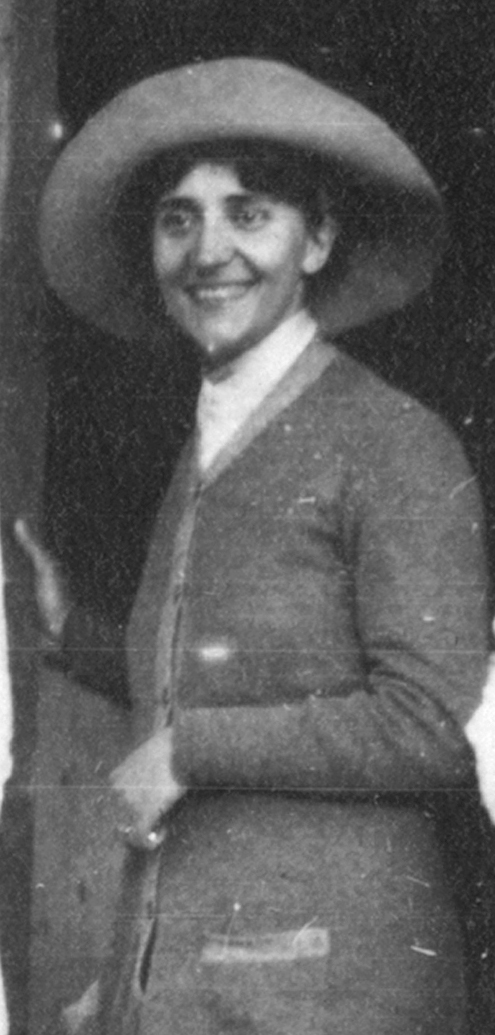
Hélène Vitivilia Leune in Filippiada, Epirus, Greece in December 1912.

Jean Victor Charles Edmond Leune (28 December 1889 – 13 May 1944) was a French war correspondent, writer, press photographer, military aviator and member of the French Resistance.

== Early life ==
Jean Leune was born on 28 December 1889 in Saint-Quentin (Aisne), France. He was the son of Alfred Leune (2 September 1857, Rouen, Normandy – 9 December 1930, Paris) and Céline Blanche "Léonie" Daix (1871–1942). The couple had three children. In 1902, Jean obtained a government scholarship to attend the prestigious Lycée Louis-le-Grand in Paris.

On 7 February 1911, Jean Leune married Hélène Vitivilia in Paris, at the townhall of the 16e arrondissement in Paris. Leune studied in the faculty history at the Sorbonne in Paris and graduated in 1912. It was likely there that he met his future wife, Hélène, who graduated from the same faculty in 1909.

== War correspondent (First Balkan War) ==
Leune travelled to the Balkans as a journalist (grand reporter) for the Parisian newspaper L'Illustration during the First Balkan War in 1912–1913. He and his wife arrived in Greece in mid-October 1912 to cover the imminent war. After temporarily residing in Athens, the couple left that city on 27 October for Larissa to follow the Greek Army. After the Greek Army took Thessaloniki, Leune and his wife travelled to Preveza to follow the Army of Epirus.

The Leunes arrived in Preveza on 24 November 1912, accompanying the Greek army.

In 1913, Jean and Hélène both contributed chapters to the book Dans les Balkans, 1912–1913 : récits et visions de guerre, that describe their wartime expériences. The following year, Jean wrote Une revanche, une étape : avec les Grecs à Salonique par Athènes et la Macédoine, campagne de 1912.

== Military career (World War I) ==
Leune was an Infantry Captain with the French Army during World War I, serving in the technical service of aviation (capitaine d'infanterie au service au service technique de l'aéronautique). He was mobilized on 2 August 1914. After spending the first part of the campaign in France, he was sent to the Corps expéditionnaire d'Orient, where he flew reconnaissance missions and organized a battalion of Greek volunteers in Moudros.

Hélène accompanied Jean to Greece, and she served as a volunteer nurse with the Red Cross in the hospitals of Thessaloniki and Moudros. Hélène gave birth to their daughter Irène in Thessaloniki in 1917.

In 1942, Irène Leune married baron Alfred Testot-Ferry (1914–1947), aviator and member of the French Resistance. Irène became one of the first women race car drivers using the pseudonym "Irène Terray," and she won many rally competitions during the 1950s (e.g. Coupe des Dames à Liège–Rome–Liège, Monte-Carlo Rally). Hélène Leune, who had been serving as a Red Cross nurse, died in Vitry-le-François (Marne), France during the bombardment that took place in that town on 18 May 1940.

Jean Leune was a remarkable observer and he performed a series of aerial reconnaissance missions with the Corps expéditionnaire d'Orient that yielded valuable information every time. He received one injury during the war and received two citations from the French Army.

As part of a military aerial competition, in August–September 1919, Captain Leune flew from Paris-Marseille-Pisa-Rome-Vallona-Thessaloniki-Constantinople, covering 5,500 km in 50 hours of flight time. He made the voyage with a mechanic, Perrin, and a radio operator, Dugré, aboard the Chimère, a Farman F.50 twin-engine bomber (275 h.p. Lorraine motors) equipped with 4 seats and a Wireless radio. In December 1919, he was serving as a Capitain-aviator in Constantinople.

== Novelist in France ==
Leune became an aviation Reserve Officer in France after the war. He was made a Chevalier of the Légion d'honneur on 2 August 1920.

Leune was an experienced press photographer and he also experimented with aerial photography (e.g. during his Paris-Constantinople flight). In 1921, he promoted the use of aerial photography for geography.

On 3 November 1921 Leune married his second wife, Germaine Berthe Emilie Fougères, at the townhall of the 5eme arrondissement in Paris.

Jean wrote three novels during the 1920s: L'Éternel Ulysse, ou la Vie aventureuse d'un Grec d'aujourd'hui, a satirical depiction of contemporary Greek society (1923); Le Malfaisant, an allegorical story about good and evil set during World War I (1927); and Au temps des Vikings : Nora la blonde, vierge, au bouclier, a historical adventure set in Scandinavia around 1000 A.D. (1928).

On 12 May 1925, as a captain in the Reserve Officers, Leune was transferred to the 34e régiment d’aviation au 3e groupe d’ouvriers d’aéronautique.

Leune actively promoted the cause of World War I veterans. In 1930, he participated in a commemoration ceremony in Gallipoli along with 450 French veterans, descendants, wives and orphans. He was the vice president of the Association nationale des anciens combattants des Dardanelles during 1938–1939.

== Journalist in Algeria ==
On the occasion of the centennial anniversary of the French colonisation of Algeria, Leune was sent to Algeria in 1930 as a correspondent for Le Temps. He stayed there for six months and travelled extensively, writing a series of articles favorable to the colony.

Jean's new wife Germaine accompanied him to Algeria. On 29 January 1930, the couple flew on the maiden flight of the airborne postal service from Alger to El Goléa, established by the Compagnie aéropostale. Later that year, Leune published the book Le miracle algérien, based on the articles he had written for Le Temps.

In 1931, Leune published Les Ailes ardentes, a novel about aviation.

== French Resistance and arrest (World War II) ==
In response to the German invasion of Poland, France declared war on Germany on 3 September 1939, and Leune was mobilised as a Reserve Officer that same month. On 10 May 1940, Germany began its invasion of the Low Countries and France in what became known as the Battle of France. After the armistice was signed on 22 June 1940, France was divided into a German occupation zone in the north and west and a Zone Libre (Free Zone) in the south.

Leune was demobilised at the end of 1940 and he remained in the Free Zone until July 1942. Leune continued to serve his country as a sous-lieutenant in the French Resistance. The Vichy authorities arrested him on 15 January 1943 and on 6 October 1943 they sentenced him to a year in prison and a fine of 1,200 francs for "actes de nature à nuire à la Défense nationale."

In March 1944 he was taken by the Germans and placed in detention at the Drancy internment camp, and then transferred to the Compiègne internment camp. On 10 May 1944 he left the Compiègne internment camp by train headed towards the Buchenwald concentration camp. Leune died from suffocation on 13 May 1944 on board the train convoy travelling from Compiègne to Buchenwald. His body was burned in the crematory at Buchewald on 15 May 1944.

== Posthumous honors ==
On 7 November 1958, the Légion d'honneur issued a certificate recognizing that Leune died for France. Leune's name is also inscribed in the Panthéon of Paris as one of the writers who died for France.

== Bibliography ==
=== Books ===
- Dans les Balkans, 1912–1913 : récits et visions de guerre / récits de Mme Hélène Leune et de MM. Gustave Cirilli, René Puaux; Gustave Babin, Georges Rémond, Capitaine de frégate Nel, Jean Leune, Alain de Penennrun (Paris: M. Imhaus et R. Chapelot, 1913)
- Une revanche, une étape : avec les Grecs à Salonique par Athènes et la Macédoine, campagne de 1912 (Paris : M. Imhaus et R. Chapelot, 1914)
- L'Éternel Ulysse, ou la Vie aventureuse d'un Grec d'aujourd'hui (Paris: Plon, Nourrit et Cie, 1923)
- Le Malfaisant (Paris: la Vraie France, 1927)
- Au temps des Vikings : Nora la blonde, vierge, au bouclier (Nancy: Berger-Levrault, 1928)
- Le miracle algérien (Nancy-Paris-Strasbourg: impr.-édit. Berger-Levrault, 1930)
- Les Ailes ardentes (Paris-Nancy-Strasbourg: impr.-édit. Berger-Levrault, 1931)

=== Selected articles ===
- “Comment Salonique s'est rendue à l'armée grecque.” Le Correspondant (Paris), 10 Juillet 1913, pp. 42–62.
- “En campagne avec l'armée grecque.” L'Illustration (Paris), No. 3674, 26 Juillet 1913.
- "De Paris à Rome et à Constantinople." Le Monde illustré (Paris), 25 October 1919, pp 804–805.
- "Impressions Aériennes." Le Correspondant (Paris), 10 Juillet 1920, volume 280, pp 340–355.

=== Speaking engagements ===
- 20 May 1921, to the Société de géographie in Paris.
