= Kostia Vlastos =

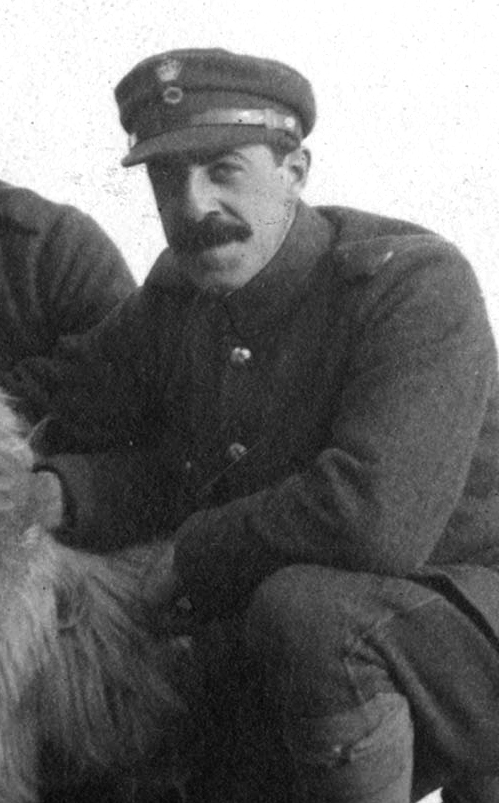
- As Greek Army sergeant in Preveza, Greece, December 1912
- Born: October 17, 1883; Paris, France
- Died: October 28, 1967 (aged 84); Bourron-Marlotte (Seine-et-Marne)
- Occupation: Banker

Kostia Vlastos (17 October 1883 – 28 October 1967) was a Greek of the diaspora, scion of a family of bankers.

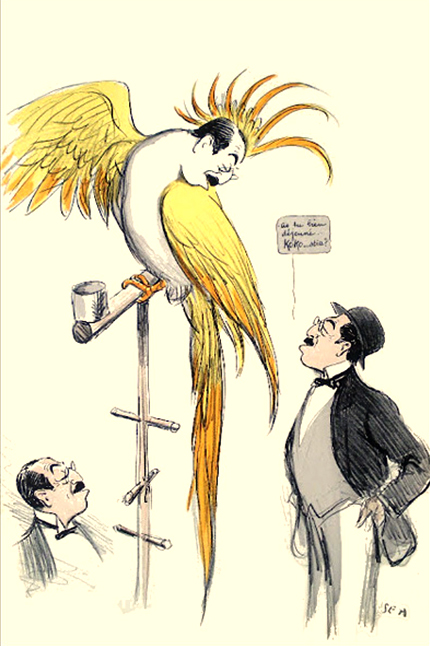
Kostia Vlastos in a caricature by Georges Goursat (1863–1934)

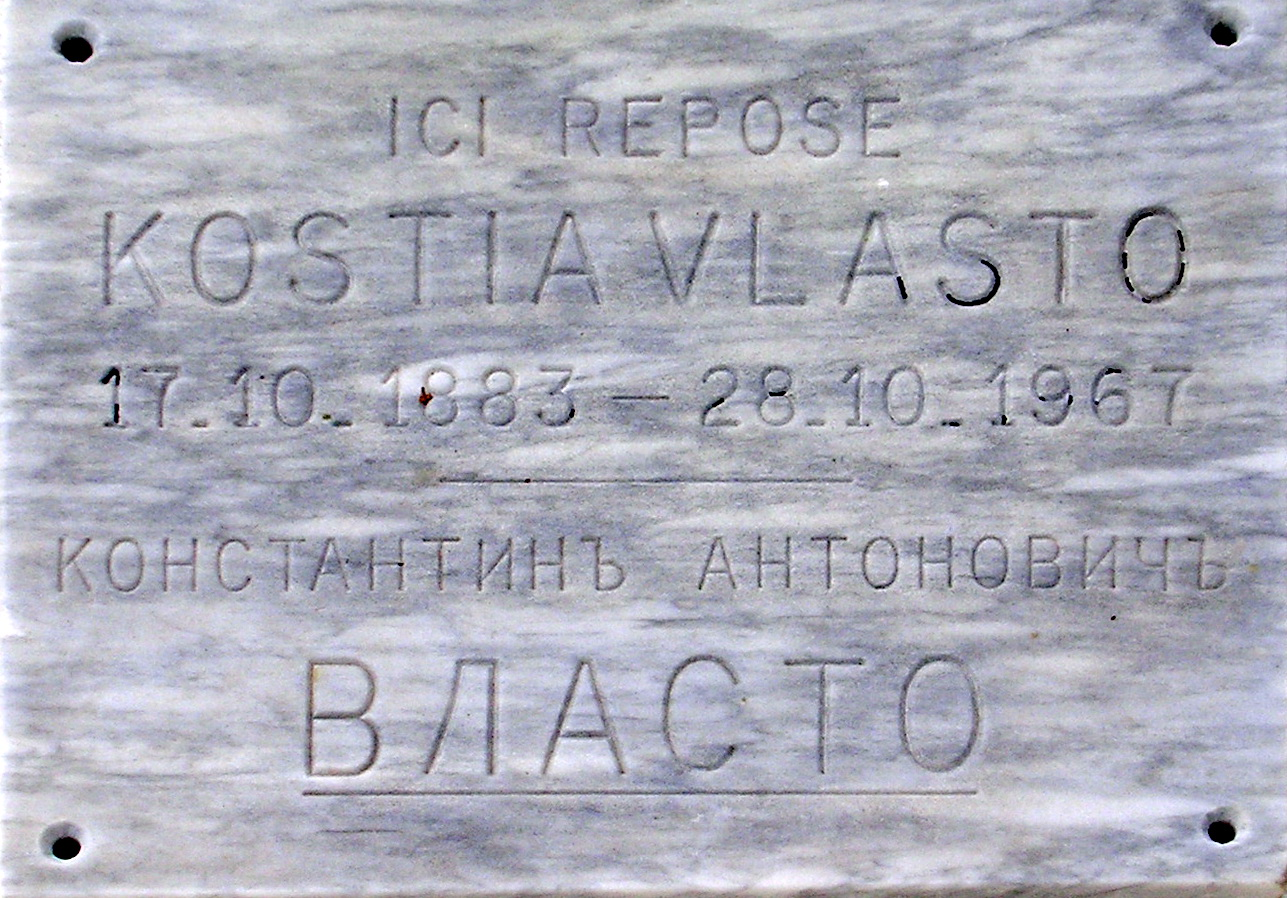
Kostia Vlastos' tombstone in Saint Geneviève-des-Bois cemetery in Paris

== Biography ==
Constantine Vlastos was born in Paris, as Constantine George Anthony Dimitrios Vlastos, but was widely known as Kostia Vlastos. His father Antonios Vlastos was born on 18 October 1858 in Galați, Romania, whose noble lineage could be traced to the island of Chios. He was active in banking and was president of the Bank of Constantinople (Banque de Constantinople) of Andreas Syngros, Georgios Koronios and Stephanos Skouloudis. He later moved to Paris, where he managed the French broker house Comptoir d'Escompte. Antonios Vlastos was a great donor and one of the founding members of the Greek Philological Society of Constantinople, in 1861. His mother, Tarsi Vlastos (1860–1919), née Zarifi, was the daughter of the known Istanbul banker George Zarifis, from which Antonios Vlastos learned the banking business.

The Aéro-Club de France awarded Kostia Vlastos a spherical balloon (sphériques) pilot license (number 287) on 20 November 1913. When the First Balkan War was declared, the 29-year-old Constantine came to Greece and volunteered in the Greek Army, providing his services for the liberation of the land of his ancestors. He initially received the rank of corporal and was later promoted to sergeant. He joined the Army Company of Automobiles, because of his ability to drive a car. During his service he was accompanied by his brother Stephen A. Vlastos (1885–1960), who was a war correspondent for the French newspaper Le Temps using the pseudonym Etienne Labranche.

== Personal life ==
Kostia Vlastos married Ludmila de Nittey, a Baltic Russian, born c. 1899 and died on 10 September 1989. The couple traveled three times to America in the 1930s and amongst their destinations was Honolulu, Hawaii, in 1932, according to the archives of Ellis Island, New York City.

== Death ==
Kostia Vlastos died in Bourron-Marlotte (Seine-et-Marne) on 28 October 1967 and was buried at the Russian Orthodox cemetery of Sainte-Genevieve-des-Bois outside Paris. His wife, Ludmila, was buried in the same tomb.

== Bibliography ==
- Philip P. Argenti, Libro d’ oro de la noblesse de Chio, vol. I - II, London, 1955.
- James S. Curlin, Ιπτάμενοι στη Νικόπολη: Η δράση του Λόχου Αεροπορίας στην Ήπειρο κατά τον Α΄ Βαλκανικό πόλεμο (1912-1913), Πρεβεζάνικα Χρονικά, vol. 49-50, pp. 283–320, Preveza, 2013.
- Christopher Long, Vlasto family of Chios, from his personal and professional pages.
- Nikos D. Karabelas, Etienne Labranche & Kostia Vlastos. Two war correspondents of Le Temps in Preveza during 1912-13, Πρεβεζάνικα Χρονικά, vol. 49-50, pp. 235–282, Preveza, 2013.
- George L. Zariphis, Οι αναμνήσεις μου. Ένας κόσμος που έφυγε. Κωνσταντινούπολη 1800-1920, Athens, 2002.
