= List of battles with most Bulgarian military fatalities =

This article contains a list of battles and military campaigns with most Bulgarian military deaths.

== Introduction ==
This article lists battles and campaigns in which the number of Bulgarian military fatalities exceed 1,000. The term casualty in warfare refers to a soldier who is no longer fit to fight after being in combat. Casualties can include killed, wounded, missing, captured or deserted.

== Battles ==
Battle or siege	Conflict	Date	Estimated number killed	Opposing force	References
Battle for Knjaževac	Second Balkan War	July 4 to 7, 1913	~5,280 killed	(Kingdom of Serbia) Serbia	
Battle of Dobro Pole	World War I	September 15 to 18, 1918	2,689 killed	France (Kingdom of Serbia) Serbia (Kingdom of Greece) Greece	
Battle of Lule Burgas	First Balkan War	October 28, 1912 to November 2, 1912	2,536 killed	Ottoman Empire	
Battle of Kalimanci	Second Balkan War	July 18 to 19, 1913	2,400 killed	(Kingdom of Serbia) Serbia	
Battle of Kaymakchalan	World War I	September 12 to 30, 1916	1,927 killed (Note: 1,876 soldiers and 51 officers)	(Kingdom of Serbia) Serbia	
Battle of Turtucaia	World War I	September 2 to 6, 1916	1,517 killed	Romania	
First Battle of Çatalca	First Balkan War	November 17 to 18, 1912	1,506 killed	Ottoman Empire	
Siege of Adrianople (1912–1913)	First Balkan War	November 3, 1912 to March 26, 1913	1,298 killed	Ottoman Empire	
Battle of Bazargic	World War I	September 5 to 7, 1916	1,053 killed	Romania; Russia (Kingdom of Serbia) Serbia	

== Campaigns ==
Campaign	Conflict	Date	Estimated number killed	Opposing force	References
Macedonian front (part of the Balkan Front)	World War I	October 21, 1915 to September 30, 1918	87,500 killed	France (Kingdom of Serbia) Serbia (British Empire) United Kingdom (Kingdom of Greece) Greece (from 1917) (Kingdom of Italy) Italy; Russian Empire (1916–1917) (Russia) Honorary Russian Legion (from 1917)	
Bulgarian Front of First Balkan War	First Balkan War	October 21, 1912 to April 3, 1913	19,835 killed	Ottoman Empire	
Belgrade offensive	World War II	September 15 to November 24, 1944	Over 3,000 killed	(Nazi Germany) Germany	
Vienna offensive	World War II	March 16 to April 15, 1945	2,698 killed	(Nazi Germany) Germany (Kingdom of Hungary (1920–1946)) Hungary	
Operation Spring Awakening	World War II	March 6 to 16, 1945	2,698 killed	(Nazi Germany) Germany (Kingdom of Hungary (1920–1946)) Hungary	
Morava Offensive (part of the Serbian campaign of 1915)	World War I	October 15 to November 9, 1915	1,906 killed	(Kingdom of Serbia) Serbia	'
Chegan offensive	World War I	August 17 to 28, 1916	1,079 killed	(Kingdom of Serbia) Serbia	
Stracin–Kumanovo operation	World War II	October 8 to November 14, 1944	Over 1,000 killed	(Nazi Germany) Germany; Chetniks	

== Sources ==
- Erickson, Edward J. (2003). Defeat in Detail: The Ottoman Army in the Balkans, 1912–1913. Greenwood Publishing Group. ISBN 0-275-97888-5.
- Ivanov, Nikola. "The Balkan War". CVA, Fonds: 48 opis 1 a.e. 3,l 86; a.e. 5,l pp=205-206. Bulgarian Military Archive.
- Hall, Richard C. (2002). "Bulgarian retreats". The Balkan Wars 1912–1913: Prelude to the First World War. Routledge. p. 116. ISBN 978-1-134-58362-1.
- Gordon-Smith, Gordon (2008) [1920]. From Serbia To Yugoslavia: Serbia's Victories, Reverses And Final Triumph, 1914–1918. New York: G.P. Putnam's Sons. ISBN 9785519466608.
