= Pravoslav Tenev =

Bulgarian infantry general

Православ Тенев Pravoslav Tenev
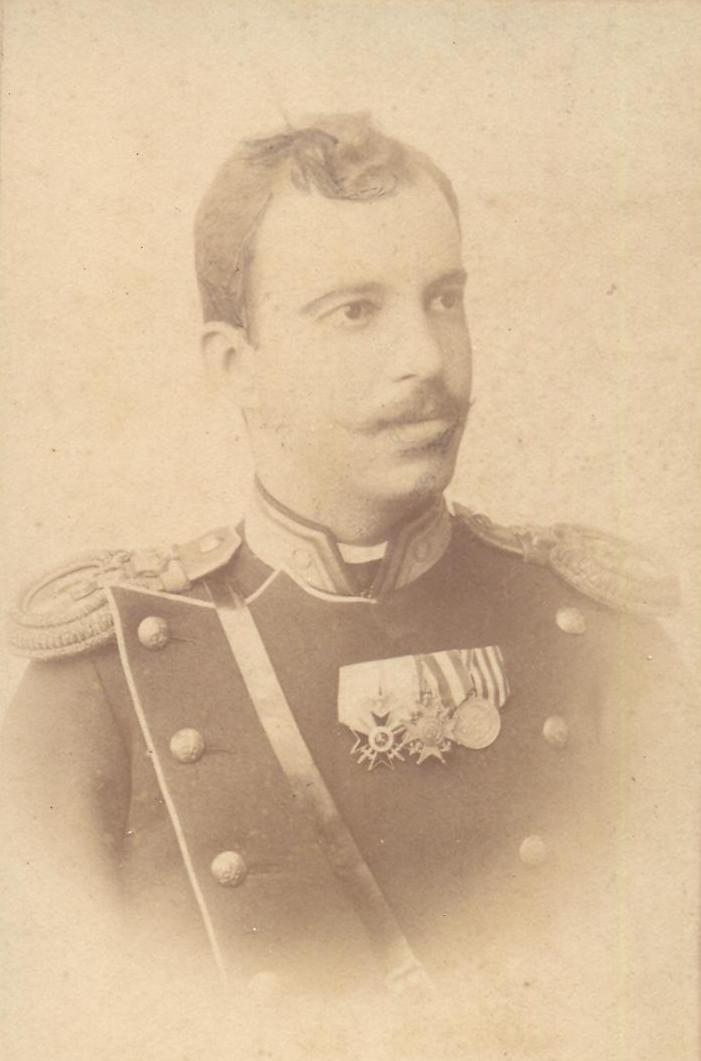
- Portrait of General Tenev

Commander of the Macedonian Military Inspection Oblast
- In office 1916–1917
- Monarch: Ferdinand I
- Prime Minister: Vasil Radoslavov
- Preceded by: Racho Petrov
- Succeeded by: Stefan Toshev

Personal details
- Born: 15 March 1862 Varna, Danube Vilayet, Ottoman Empire
- Died: 25 December 1942 (aged 80) Sofia, Bulgaria

Military service
- Allegiance: Principality of Bulgaria; Kingdom of Bulgaria
- Years of service: 1879 – 1918
- Rank: Infantry General
- Commands: Third Army
- Battles/wars: Serbo-Bulgarian War; First Balkan War; Bulgarian front; Second Balkan War; Battle of Doiran; World War I

Pravoslav Krastev Tenev was a Bulgarian Infantry General and Chief of Staff of The Army (6 March 1914 - 15 April 1915).

== Biography ==
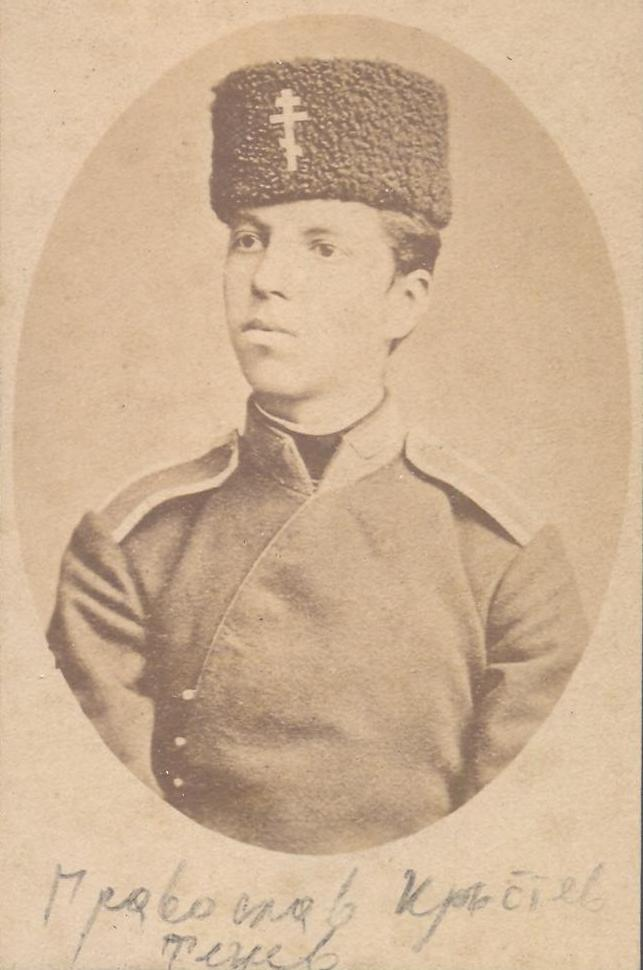
Tenev as a young man

Pravoslav Tenev was born on 15 March 1862 in Varna. On 5 October 1879 he entered military service, and in 1882 he graduated from the Military School of Vasil Levski National Military University in Sofia and on 30 August he was promoted to the rank of lieutenant, enlisted in the Rahovska No. 12 infantry company. In April 1885 he was appointed subaltern-officer in the newly formed 8th Marine Regiment, and on 30 August 1885 was promoted to lieutenant.

=== Serbo-Bulgarian War ===
During the Serbian-Bulgarian War of 1885, Lieutenant Tanev served as commander of the 3rd company of 8th Marine Regiment.

After the war served as a company commander in the Battle of HRH school, then the Ninth Plovdiv Infantry Regiment. On 1 January 1888 he was promoted to the rank of captain, and in 1893 to the rank of major. In 1892, he graduated from General Staff Academy in Turin, Italy, and then served as general staff officer, a senior aide to the Sixth Bdina Infantry Division, and was head of the operational department in the Chief of Staff of the First Sofia Infantry Division in Sofia. On 1 January 1898 he was promoted to the rank of lieutenant colonel. In 1899 he was appointed commander of the 22nd Infantry Regiment Thracian on which the service is up to 1902, when he was appointed chief of staff of the 4th Infantry Preslav Division when the service is up to 1903.

In 1903 Colonel Pravda Tanev took command of the 2nd Brigade of 9 -a Infantry Division Pleven on which service is up to 1905. He later served as chief of staff of the Ministry of War and in 1907 was appointed chief of the 6th Bdina Infantry Division. On 15 October 1908 he was promoted to the rank of Major General.

=== Balkan Wars and World War I ===
During the First Balkan War he continued to command the 6th Bdina Infantry Division, which is part of the Third Bulgarian Army. During the Battle of Kirk Kilisse, the Sixth Division was kept as a reserve and only its Second Brigade joined at the most critical moment. In the Battle of Lule Burgas, it was located on the right flank of the advancing Third Army and captured Luleburgaz on the first day of the fighting. Later, in the course of the operation, he made the important breakthrough near the village of Sakızköy. After Luleburgaz, the Sixth Division was transferred to the First Bulgarian Army (commanding lieutenant general Vasil Kutinchev). During the First Battle of Çatalca, it was located in the central section of the front, where an auxiliary strike was to be carried out during the offensive. On the first day of the operation, she managed to capture the fortress of Otluktabia with great difficulty, but the next day, was forced to withdraw.

On 6 March 1914 Major General Tenev was appointed Chief of Staff of the Army, a position he held until March 1915. On 27 March 1915 he was promoted to the rank of lieutenant general. When Bulgaria joined the First World War (September 1915), he was head of the Main Logistics Department. Until 15 January 1917 he was temporarily appointed head of the Macedonian Military Inspection District. Then, until 1918, he was a general for orders at the United States. In 1916, at his suggestion, the commander-in-chief of the Bulgarian army issued an order for the establishment of a military museum. On 31 October 1918 he was promoted to the rank of infantry general and dismissed from the army.

Infantry General Pravoslav Tenev died on 25 December 1942 in Sofia.

== Awards ==
- Order of Bravery, III degree, 2nd class, IV degree, 2nd class\
- Order of Saint Alexander, II degree with swords in the middle, V degree without swords
- Order of Military Merit, III degree and IV degree on ordinary ribbon
- Order for Merit
- Stara Planina, I degree with swords, posthumously

== Bibliography ==
- Nedev, S., The Command of the Bulgarian Army during the Wars of National Unification, Sofia, 1993, Military Publishing Complex "St. George the Victorious ”, p. 114
