= Second Balkan War order of battle: Bulgarian Army =

The following is the Bulgarian order of battle at the start of the Second Balkan War as of 29 June [O.S. 16 June] 1913. This order of battle includes all combat units, including engineer and artillery units, but not medical, supply, signal, border guard and garrison units.

== Background ==
During First Balkan War Bulgaria mobilized 599,878 men out of a total male population of 1,914,160. Final victory over the Ottoman Empire however came at the cost of some 33,000 killed and 50,000 wounded soldiers while many others were affected by the spread of cholera and dysentery. With the end of the war the relations between the members of the Balkan League deteriorated rapidly due to the unresolved problem of the division of the conquered lands which forced Bulgaria to transfer its armies from Thrace to Macedonia.

On the eve of the outbreak of the Second Balkan War the field forces of the Bulgarian Army were deployed in five armies along a 500 kilometer front from the Danube to the Aegean Sea. Despite all the measures taken by the military authorities, including the drafting of young Bulgarian men aged 20–26 years living in the newly occupied territories in Thrace and Macedonia, the number of mobilized personnel reached a total of 500,491 men. Thus for the war against its former allies Bulgaria could rely on manpower that was about 83% of the one available during the First Balkan War.

The Bulgarian command deployed five field armies against Serbia and Greece while it kept minimal forces near the Ottoman border and no forces at all on the Romanian border. Besides the 11 infantry division, 1 cavalry division and the Macedonian-Adrianopolitan Volunteer Corps the high command also raised two additional infantry divisions(12th and 13th) and one independent infantry brigade. Many of the old divisions however had at least one of their infantry brigades taken away and attached to the field armies as independent units which created logistical difficulties. Thus it seemed the Bulgarian GHQ was attempting to provide greater numbers of available units while disregarding the quality of some of those units. As a result, the total strength of the field forces was increased to around 297 infantry battalions, 47 cavalry squadrons and 186 artillery batteries.

The material situation of the armed forces was improved compared to the first war. The number of available horses was increased by 12,594 to 97,456 while the number of rifles increased by 44,561 to 378,996 and artillery guns by 112 to 1228. Still according to the mobilization plans of the General Staff the army was supposed to have 483,674 rifles and 117,733 which showed that, like the manpower deficit, the material shortages had not been dealt with by the time the war began.

== GHQ ==
The nominal commander in chief of the Bulgarian Army was Tsar Ferdinand I but de facto its control and leadership were initially in the hands of his deputy Lieutenant-General Mihail Savov. The Chief of the General Staff Major-General Ivan Fichev opposed the war and was officially in resignation, though de facto he was never dismissed, while his functions were carried out by the Deputy Chief of Staff Colonel Stefan Nerezov. Other notable changes in the command structure took place almost immediately after the outbreak of the war when General Savov was fired as deputy of the commander-in-chief, although he latter returned to take command of the combined 5th, 4th and 2nd armies. Ferdinand chose the Russophile General Dimitriev as his deputy while General Racho Petrov assumed command of the 3rd Army.

== Order of battle ==
=== Operating against the Serbian Army ===
==== First Army ====
First Army was commanded by Lieutenant-General Vasil Kutinchev.

- 5th Danube Infantry Division
  - 1st Brigade
    - 2nd "Iskar" Infantry Regiment
    - 5th "Danube" Infantry Regiment
  - 2nd Brigade
    - 18th "Etarski" Infantry Regiment
    - 20th "Dobruja" Infantry Regiment
  - 1st QF FAR (Note: Quick-firing field artillery regiment (QF FAR), mountain artillery regiment (MAR).)
  - 1st FAR
  - 5th Pioneer Battalion
- 9th Pleven Infantry Division
  - 1st Brigade
    - 4th "Pleven" Infantry Regiment
    - 17th "Dorostol" Infantry Regiment
  - 2nd Brigade
    - 33rd "Svishtov" Infantry Regiment
    - 34th "Troyan" Infantry Regiment
  - 9th QF FAR
  - 9th Pioneer Battalion
- Independent Infantry Brigade
  - 65th Infantry Regiment
  - 66th Infantry Regiment
  - 1/8 Artillery Section
- Army Troops
  - two cavalry squadrons

==== Third Army ====
Third Army was commanded by Lieutenant-General Radko Dimitriev.

- 1st Sofia Infantry Division
  - 1st Brigade Colonel
    - 1st "Sofia" Infantry Regiment
    - 6th "Turnovo" Infantry Regiment
  - 2nd Brigade (Major-General
    - 37th Infantry Regiment
    - 38th Infantry Regiment
  - 4th QF FAR
  - 4th FAR
  - 1st Pioneer Battalion
- 13th Infantry Division
  - 62nd Infantry Regiment
  - 63rd Infantry Regiment
  - 64th Infantry Regiment
  - 13th FAR
- 3/5 Infantry Brigade
  - 45th Infantry Regiment
  - 46th Infantry Regiment
  - 1/1 Artillery Section
- Cavalry Division
  - 1st Brigade
    - 1st Cavalry Regiment
    - Leib Guard Cavalry Regiment
  - 2nd Brigade
    - 2nd Cavalry Regiment
    - 7th Cavalry Regiment
  - 5/5 Artillery Battery
- Army Troops
  - 3rd Cavalry Regiment
  - Army Artillery

==== Fifth Army ====
Fifth Army was commanded by Major-General Stefan Toshev.

- 4th Preslav Infantry Division
  - 1st Brigade
    - 7th "Preslav" Infantry Regiment
    - 19th "Shumen" Infantry Regiment
  - 3rd Brigade
    - 43rd Infantry Regiment
    - 44th Infantry Regiment
  - 5th QF FAR
  - 5th FAR
  - 4th Pioneer Battalion
- 12th Infantry Division
  - 59th Infantry Regiment
  - 60th Infantry Regiment
  - 61st Infantry Regiment
  - 12th FAR
- Odrin Brigade
  - 71st Infantry Regiment
  - 72nd Infantry Regiment
  - 2/10 Artillery Section
- Army Troops
  - 6th Cavalry Regiment
  - Army Artillery

==== Fourth Army ====
Fourth Army was commanded by Major-General Stiliyan Kovachev.

- 2nd Thracian Infantry Division
  - 1st Brigade
    - 9th "Plovdiv" Infantry Regiment
    - 21st "Srednogorian" Infantry Regiment
  - 2nd Brigade
    - 28th "Stremski" Infantry Regiment
    - 27th "Chepinski" Infantry Regiment
  - 3rd Brigade
    - 39th Infantry Regiment
    - 40th Infantry Regiment
  - 3rd QF FAR
  - 3rd MAR
  - 2nd Pioneer Battalion
- 7th Rila Infantry Division
  - 1st Brigade
    - 13th "Rila" Infantry Regiment
    - 28th "Pernik" Infantry Regiment
  - 2nd Brigade
    - 14th "Macedonian" Infantry Regiment
    - 22nd "Thracian" Infantry Regiment
  - 3rd Brigade
    - 49th Infantry Regiment
    - 50th Infantry Regiment
  - 7th QF FAR
  - 9th FAR
  - 1/2 Mountain Artillery Section
  - 7th Pioneer Battalion
- 8th Tundzha Infantry Division
  - 1st Brigade
    - 12th "Balkan" Infantry Regiment
    - 23rd "Shipka" Infantry Regiment
  - 2nd Brigade
    - 10th "Rhodope" Infantry Regiment
    - 30th "Sheinovo" Infantry Regiment
  - 3rd Brigade
    - 51st Infantry Regiment
    - 52nd Infantry Regiment
  - 8th FAR
  - 2/1 Artillery Section
  - 8th Pioneer Battalion
- 1/3 Infantry Brigade
  - 1st "Sofia" Infantry Regiment
  - 6th "Turnovo" Infantry Regiment
  - 1/6 Artillery Section
- 2/4 Infantry Brigade
  - 8th "Primorski" Infantry Regiment
  - 31st "Varna" Infantry Regiment
  - 2/5 Artillery Section
- Macedonian-Adrianopolitan Volunteer Corps
  - 1st Brigade
    - 1st "Debar" Infantry Battalion
    - 2nd "Skopie" Infantry Battalion
    - 3rd "Solun" Infantry Battalion
    - 4th "Bitolia" Infantry Battalion
    - 13th "Kukush" Infantry Battalion
  - 2nd Brigade
    - 5th "Odrin" Infantry Battalion
    - 6th "Ohrid" Infantry Battalion
    - 7th "Kumanovo" Infantry Battalion
    - 8th "Kostur" Infantry Battalion
    - 14th "Voden" Infantry Battalion
  - 3rd Brigade
    - 9th "Veles" Infantry Battalion
    - 10th "Prilep" Infantry Battalion
    - 11th "Serres" Infantry Battalion
    - 12th "Lozengrad" Infantry Battalion
    - 15th "Shtip " Infantry Battalion
  - 2/8 Artillery Section
  - 2/2 QF Mountain Artillery Section
  - 3/2 QF Mountain Artillery Section
  - 4/2 Mountain Artillery Section
  - Army Troops
    - 5th Cavalry Regiment
    - 7th Opalchenie Regiment

=== Operating against the Greek Army ===
==== Second Army ====
Second Army was commanded by Lieutenant-General Nikola Ivanov.

- 3rd Balkan Infantry Division
  - 2nd Brigade
    - 29th "Yambol" Infantry Regiment
    - 32nd "Zagora" Infantry Regiment
  - 3rd Brigade
    - 41st Infantry Regiment
    - 42nd Infantry Regiment
  - 6th QF FAR
  - 6th FAR
  - 3rd Pioneer Battalion
- 11th Infantry Division
  - 55th Infantry Regiment
  - 56th Infantry Regiment
  - 57th Infantry Regiment
  - 11th FAR
- 1/10 Infantry Brigade
  - 16th "Lovech" Infantry Regiment
  - 25th "Dragoman" Infantry Regiment
  - 3/10 Artillery Section
- Serres Infantry Brigade
  - 67th Infantry Regiment
  - 68th Infantry Regiment
  - 1/1 Artillery Section
- Drama Infantry Brigade
  - 69th Infantry Regiment
  - 70th Infantry Regiment
  - 2/7 Artillery Section
- Army Troops
  - 7th Replacement Infantry Regiment
  - 10th Cavalry Regiment
  - 5th Border Guards Battalion
  - 1st, 3rd, 5th, 6th, 7th, 8th, 10th Replacement Cavalry Squadrons
  - 2/8 QF Howitzer Section

=== Reserve of the High Command ===
- 6th Bdin Infantry Division
  - 1st Brigade
    - 3rd "Bdin" Infantry Regiment
    - 15th "Lom" Infantry Regiment
  - 2nd Brigade
    - 35th "Vratsa" Infantry Regiment
    - 36th "Kozloduy" Infantry Regiment
  - 2nd QF FAR
  - 6th Pioneer Battalion

=== Forces in Eastern Thrace ===
- 2/10 Infantry Brigade
  - 47th Infantry Regiment
  - 48th Infantry Regiment
  - two cavalry squadrons
  - 1/2 Artillery Section
- 9th Cavalry Regiment
- 8th Cavalry Regiment
- 58th Infantry Regiment

== Notes ==
Footnotes

Citations
