= Wiktor Unander =

Swedish, French, and Ottoman army officer

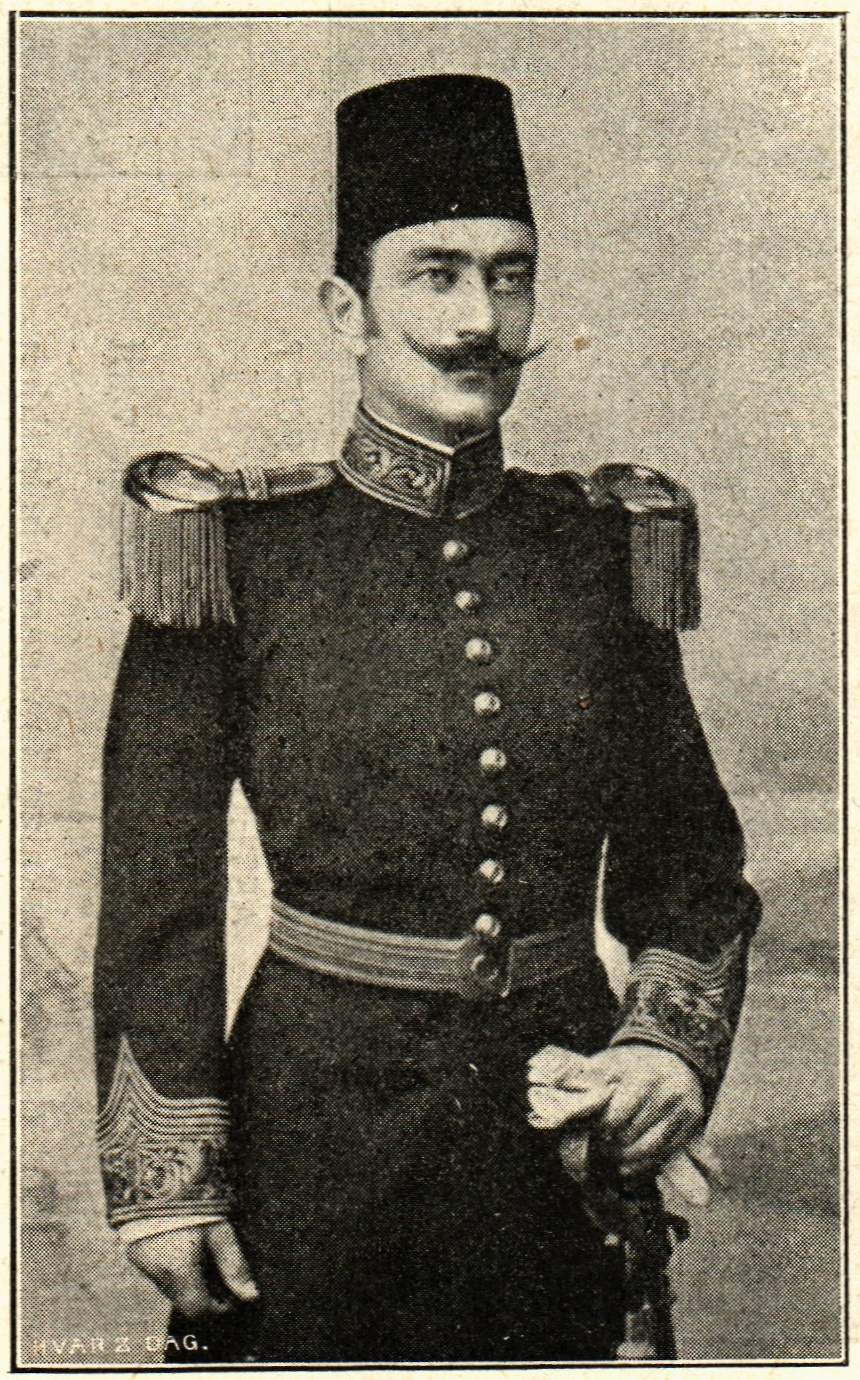
- Unander pictured in Ottoman gendarmerie uniform.
- Born: Wiktor Axel Unander; 18 December 1872; Yttertavle, Sweden
- Died: 20 September 1967 (aged 94); Bern, Switzerland
- Burial place: Norra begravningsplatsen
- Relatives: Jesper Crusebjörn (father-in-law)
- Military career
- Allegiance: Sweden
- Branch: Swedish Army (1894–1900, 1906–22); French Army (1900–1902); Ottoman Army (1903–1906)
- Service years: 1894–1922
- Rank: Major
- Nickname: Unax
- Conflicts: First Balkan War: Battle of Lule Burgas; First Battle of Çatalca

Wiktor Axel Unander (18 December 1872 – 20 September 1967) was a Swedish Army officer who also served in the French Army in Algeria and in the Ottoman Army in the Balkans. He also served in the Swedish foreign service as diplomatic agent and consul general in Egypt and as consul in Zagreb.

== Early life ==
Unander was born on 18 December 1872 in Yttertavle, Sweden, the son of secretary Ph.D. Ferdinand Unander and his wife Fanny (née Scharin). He passed studentexamen in Stockholm in 1892.

== Career ==
In 1894, Unander graduated from the Military Academy Karlberg. He attended the same class at Karlberg as Lieutenant General Oscar Osterman, Colonel Reinhold Geijer, Colonel Jacques Virgin, Colonel Casimir Lewenhaupt, and Colonel Erland Ljungberg. He was commissioned as an officer in Västerbotten Regiment in 1894 with the rank of underlöjtnant. Unander was promoted to lieutenant in 1896 and attended the Royal Central Gymnastics Institute from 1896 to 1897 and then the Royal Swedish Army Staff College from 1898 to 1900. He served in the French Army and in the 1st Zouave Regiment in Algeria from 1900 to 1902. He became major 1st class (binbashi) in the Ottoman Army in 1903 and was employed in the staff of Hüseyin Hilmi Pasha, the Inspectorate-General of Macedonia the same year. There he participated in the settlement of the reorganization plan for the gendarmerie corps in Macedonia, and the reorganization plan from 1903 to 1906 regarding police and gendarmerie corps in the Old Serbia, Manastir Vilayet and in the Albanian Vilayet.

Unander re-entered the Swedish Army in 1906 and was promoted to captain in Västerbotten Regiment in 1907. He served in the 1st Life Grenadier Regiment in 1911 and from October 1912 to May 1913 as military attaché in Constantinople, where he took part in the Battle of Lule Burgas and the First Battle of Çatalca during the First Balkan War. Unander served as a special attaché in London from 1917 to 1918 and he was promoted to major in Norrbotten Regiment the same year. He was acting diplomatic agent and consul general in Egypt from 1919 to 1922 and served in the South Scanian Infantry Regiment (I 7) in 1922. Unander last assignment was as Swedish consul in Zagreb from 1926 to 1929.

On 21 March 1936, in his home at Drottninggatan 36 in Malmö and surrounded by like-minded people, Unander founded Travellers Club in Malmö, a gentlemen's club which consists of men who have gained experience and knowledge of foreign countries and cultures and who wish to exchange thoughts and experiences. He served as the club's first Dux Emeritus until 1953.

== Personal life ==
On 5 May 1905 in Vienna, Austria, he married Cecilia Crusebjörn (1878–1966), the daughter of Lieutenant General Jesper Crusebjörn and Augusta Bahrman. They had one daughter, Nedjibé (1907–1995), who married doctor A. W. Ott of Langendorf, Switzerland.

== Death ==
Unander died on 20 September 1967 in Bern, Switzerland and was buried on 22 December 1967 in Norra begravningsplatsen in Stockholm.

== Dates of rank ==
=== Swedish Army ===
- 1894 – Underlöjtnant
- 1896 – Lieutenant
- 1907 – Captain
- 1918 – Major

=== Turkish Army ===
- 1903 – Major 1st Class

== Awards and decorations ==
Unander's awards:

- Knight of the Order of the Sword
- Knight of the Order of the Polar Star
- Konung Gustaf V:s olympiska minnesmedalj
- Grand Cordon of the Order of the Nile
- Commander of the Order of St. Sava
- Second Class of the Order of the Medjidie
- Knight of the Legion of Honour
- Officier d'Académie
- Second and Third Class of the Red Cross Medal
- TftjGM

== Bibliography ==
- Unander, Wiktor (1947). På farofyllda uppdrag i österled: minnen och upplevelser (in Swedish). Malmö: Globförl. SELIBR 1420982.
- Unander, Wiktor (1943). På jakt med Karl XII: med förord (in Swedish). Malmö: Globförl. SELIBR 1420983.
- Unander, Wiktor (1943). Nedjibe: roman från Turkiet (in Swedish). Malmö: Globförl. SELIBR 1420981.
- Unander, Wiktor (1938). Minnesskrift med anledning av Unanderska släktföreningens 25-åriga tillvaro (in Swedish). Malmö: Röhr. SELIBR 1380704.
- Unander, Wiktor (1926). Folk- och gränsförskjutningar på Balkan och i främre orienten. Meddelanden från Lunds universitets geografiska institution, 0375-6874; C 16 (in Swedish). Lund. SELIBR 2877600.
- Unander, Wiktor (1914). Unander-Smaræus: genealogi med biografier (in Swedish). Stockholm: Bröderna Lagerström. SELIBR 1640880.
- Conférence sur Varmée suédoise (1902)
