= Jesper Crusebjörn =

Swedish politician and officer (1843–1904)

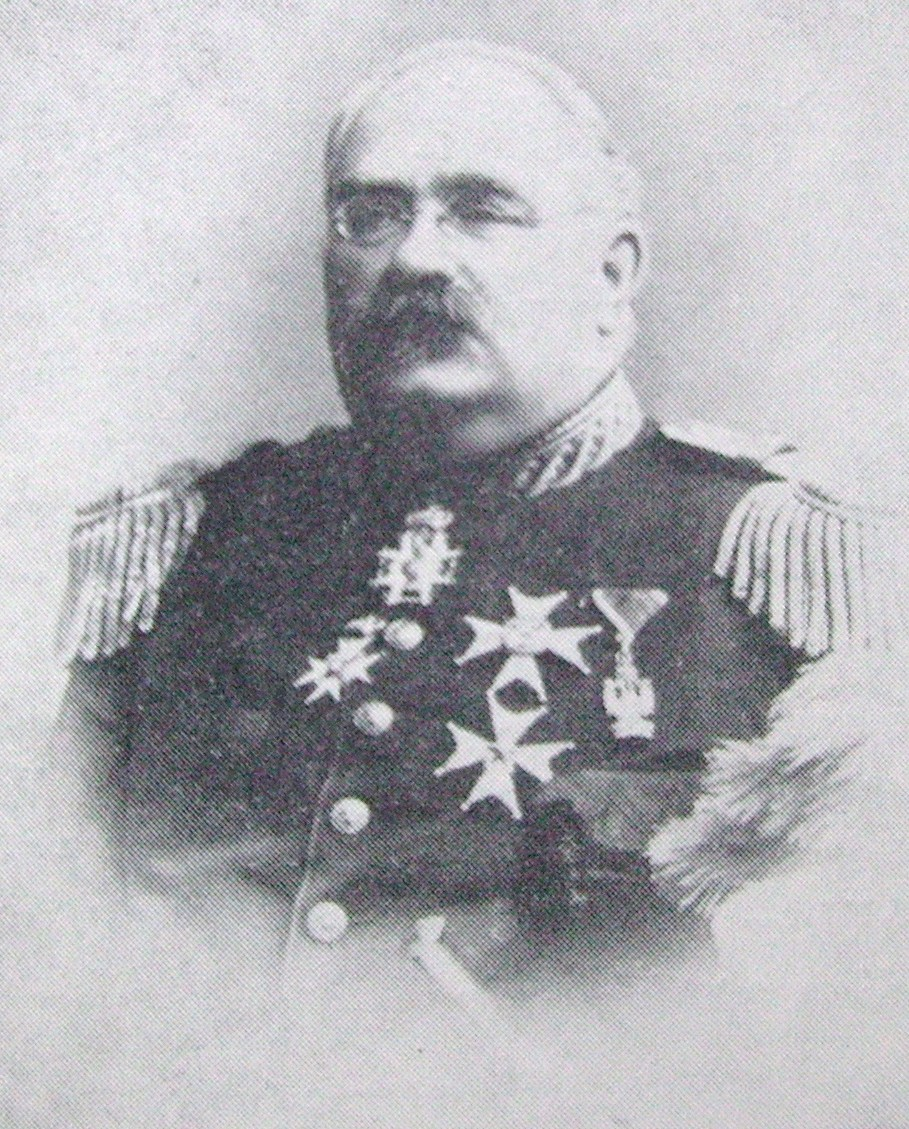
- Born: Jesper Ingevald Crusebjörn; 12 July 1843; Åvinge, Sweden
- Died: 24 June 1904 (aged 60); Umeå, Sweden
- Relatives: Wiktor Unander (son-in-law)
- Military career
- Branch: Swedish Army
- Service years: 1863–1903
- Rank: Lieutenant general
- Commands: Jämtland Ranger Corps
- Other work: Minister for War

Lieutenant General Jesper Ingevald Crusebjörn (12 July 1843 – 24 June 1904) was a Swedish Army officer and politician. He served as minister for war (1899–1903) and as governor of Västerbotten County (1891–1904).

== Early life ==
Crusebjörn was born on 12 July 1843 at Avinge in Grödinge socken, Botkyrka Municipality, Stockholm County, Sweden, the son of the court squire (hovjunkare) Frans Adolf Crusebjörn and Lovisa Magdalena Fougt.

He attended Strängnäs Higher General Secondary School in Strängnäs from the autumn term of 1855 until the spring term of 1862, and enrolled at Uppsala University on 26 May 1862. On 8 September 1862, he was appointed an unpaid furir in the Västmanland Regiment. In 1863, he advanced through the ranks in the Second Life Guards and, on 26 October of that year, passed his officer’s examination.

== Career ==
Crusebjörn was attached to the general staff and teacher at the Swedish National War College from 1872 to 1882. By 1883 he had been promoted to major and in 1888 he was promoted to lieutenant-colonel and took charge of Jämtland Ranger Corps (I 23). He was promoted again three years later to colonel. At the same time he became county governor of Västerbotten County. Making major general by 1899, he was also appointed Minister for War, a position he held from 1899 to 1903, during which he enforced the construction of Boden Fortress and was promoted to lieutenant general (1901). He was also a member of the Royal Swedish Academy of War Sciences.

== Personal life ==
On 31 July 1873 at Lövstalund in Grödinge socken Crusebjörn married Augusta Georgina Bahrman (born 23 July 1850), the daughter of stadsmäklaren Göran Napoleon Bahrman in Stockholm.

His daughter Cecilia Crusebjörn (1878–1966), married Major Wiktor Unander on 5 May 1905 in Vienna, Austria.

== Death ==
Crusebjörn died on 24 June 1904 in Umeå, Sweden.

== Dates of rank ==
Crusebjörn's dates of rank:

- 8 September 1862 – Furir
- 11 December 1863 – Underlöjtnant
- 12 November 1867 – Lieutenant 2nd Class
- 19 December 1873 – Lieutenant
- 27 August 1875 – Captain
- 13 April 1883 – Major
- 3 February 1888 – Lieutenant colonel and 1st Major
- 11 September 1891 – Colonel
- 27 October 1899 – Major general
- 7 June 1901 – Lieutenant general

== Awards and decorations ==
- Commander Grand Cross of the Order of the Sword (1901)
- Commander 1st Class of the Order of the Sword (1900)
- Knight of the Order of the Sword (1884)
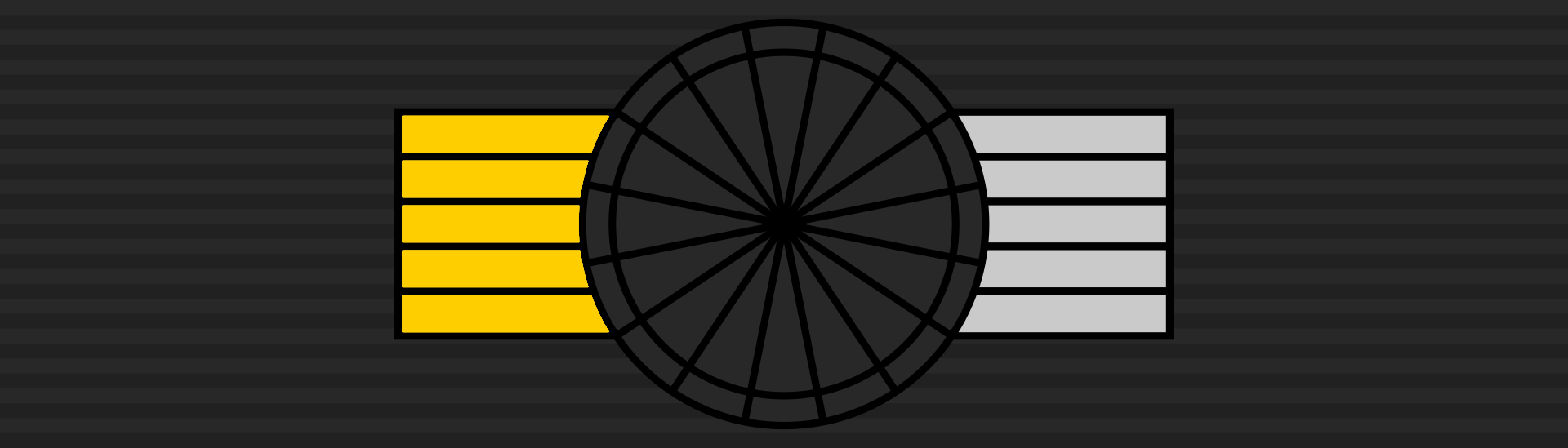
- Commander 1st Class of the Order of the Polar Star (1893)
- Knight of the Order of the Polar Star (1882)

== Honours ==
- Member of the Royal Swedish Academy of War Sciences (1876)
- Member of the Royal Swedish Academy of Agriculture and Forestry (1899)
- Honorary member of the Västerbotten County Agricultural Society (Västerbottens läns hushållningssällskap) (1900)

Political offices
Preceded by Axel Wästfelt	Governor of Västerbotten County; 1891–1904	Succeeded by Axel Asker
Preceded by Axel Rappe	Minister for War; 1899–1903	Succeeded by Otto Virgin
