= Mahmud Muhtar Pasha =

Turkish military officer and diplomat (1867–1935)

Mahmud Muhtar Pasha (until 1934) Mahmut Muhtar Katırcıoğlu (since 1934)
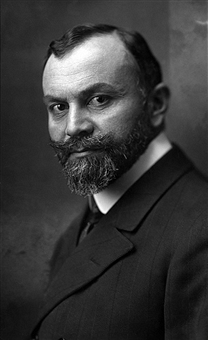
- Born: Mahmud Muhtar; 1867; Constantinople, Ottoman Empire
- Died: 15 March 1935 (aged 67–68); On a passenger ship going from Alexandria to Naples
- Military career
- Allegiance: Ottoman Empire
- Rank: Lieutenant general
- Commands: 1st Division, III Corps, Naval Minister
- Conflicts: Greco-Turkish War (1897); Battle of Velestino; Battle of Domokos; Italo-Turkish War; First Balkan War; Bulgarian Front; Battle of Kirk Kilisse; Battle of Lule Burgas; First Battle of Çatalca; First World War

Minister of the Navy of the Ottoman Empire
- In office 14 November 1910 – 30 September 1911
- Monarch: Mehmed V
- Grand Vizier: Ibrahim Hakkı Pasha
- Preceded by: Salih Hulusi Pasha
- Succeeded by: Hurshid Pasha
- In office 12 July – 29 October 1912
- Monarch: Mehmed V
- Grand Vizier: Ahmed Muhtar Pasha
- Preceded by: Hurshid Pasha
- Succeeded by: Çürüksulu Mahmud Pasha

Mahmud Muhtar Pasha also spelled Mahmut Muhtar Pasha (Turkish: Mahmut Muhtar Paşa; 1867 – 15 March 1935), known as Mahmut Muhtar Katırcıoğlu since 1934, was an Ottoman-born Turkish military officer and diplomat, the son of the Grand Vizier Ahmed Muhtar Pasha.

== Biography ==
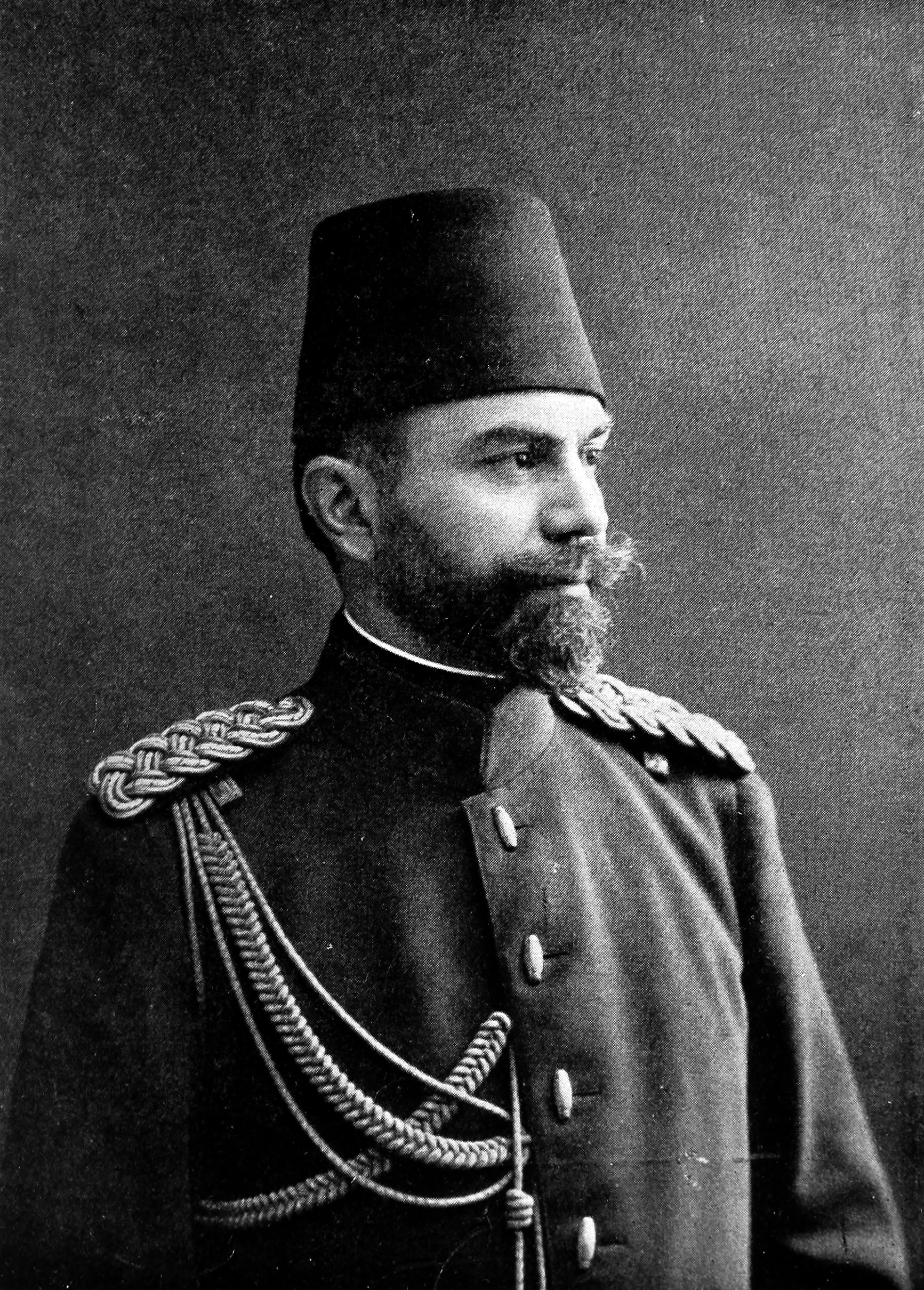
Mahmud Muhtar Pasha in 1916

He was of Turkish origin. He was born in Constantinople and returned to the city in 1893 after seven years' military education in Germany. He was a participant in the Greco-Turkish War of 1897, in spite of the prohibition by the Sultan Abd-ul-Hamid II. In 1910, he became Minister of the Navy in Ibrahim Hakki Pasha's cabinet and arranged the construction of the first Turkish dreadnought. He married Princess Nimetullah Khanum Effendi, a daughter of Isma'il Pasha and they had five children.

At the outbreak of the First Balkan War in 1912, he went to the front, commanded the III Corps in the Battle of Kirk Kilisse, Battle of Lule Burgas and was severely wounded in the First Battle of Çatalca He wrote an account of his experiences in the Balkan War titled Why We Lost Rumelia (Turkish: Rumeli'yi Neden Kaybettik), of which German and French versions appeared in 1913. He later fought in the Turkish War of Independence where he joined the forces of Mustafa Kemal Atatürk.

On 30 May 1929, Mahmud Muhtar Pasha was put on trial before the Supreme Court (formerly Ottoman Turkish: Divan'ı Ali, today Turkish: Yüce Divan) on charges of damnifying the state treasury by remitting 20,000 pounds without security to the British Thames Ironworks and Shipbuilding Company in conjunction with works for the Anatolian Railway Company. On 3 November 1929, he was sentenced to making a payment of 22,000 Turkish gold coins discounted by five percent.

== See also ==
- List of Turkish diplomats
