= Aračić =

Aračić is a Croatian and Serbian surname. It may refer to:

- Ante Aračić (born 1981), Croatian footballer
- Ilija Aračić (born 1970), Croatian footballer
- Luka Aračić (born 1981), Croatian long-jumper
- Vukoman Aračić (1850–1915), Serbian general
