= Second Battle of Çatalca =

Balkan Wars

- Part of the Bulgarian front of the First Balkan War
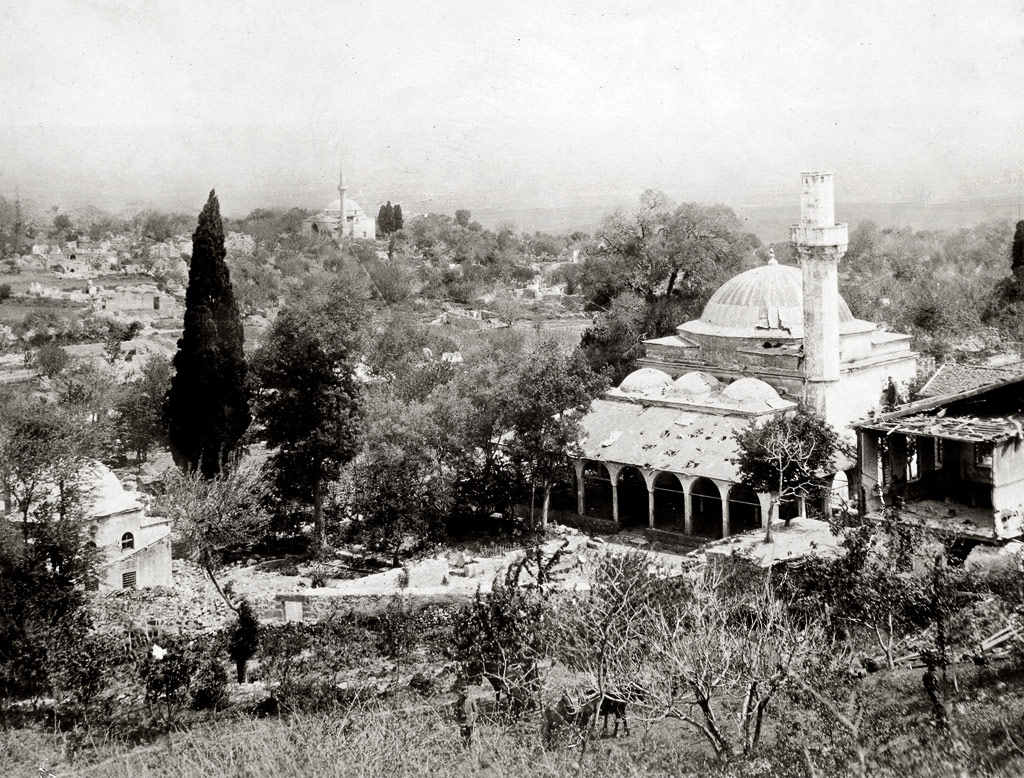
- Destroyed mosque after fighting in Çatalca
Date	3 February – 3 April 1913
Location	Çatalca Line 41°08′30″N 28°27′47″E
Result	Small territorial gains for the Bulgarians

Belligerents
Bulgaria	Ottoman Empire

Commanders and leaders
Vasil Kutinchev	Nazim Pasha

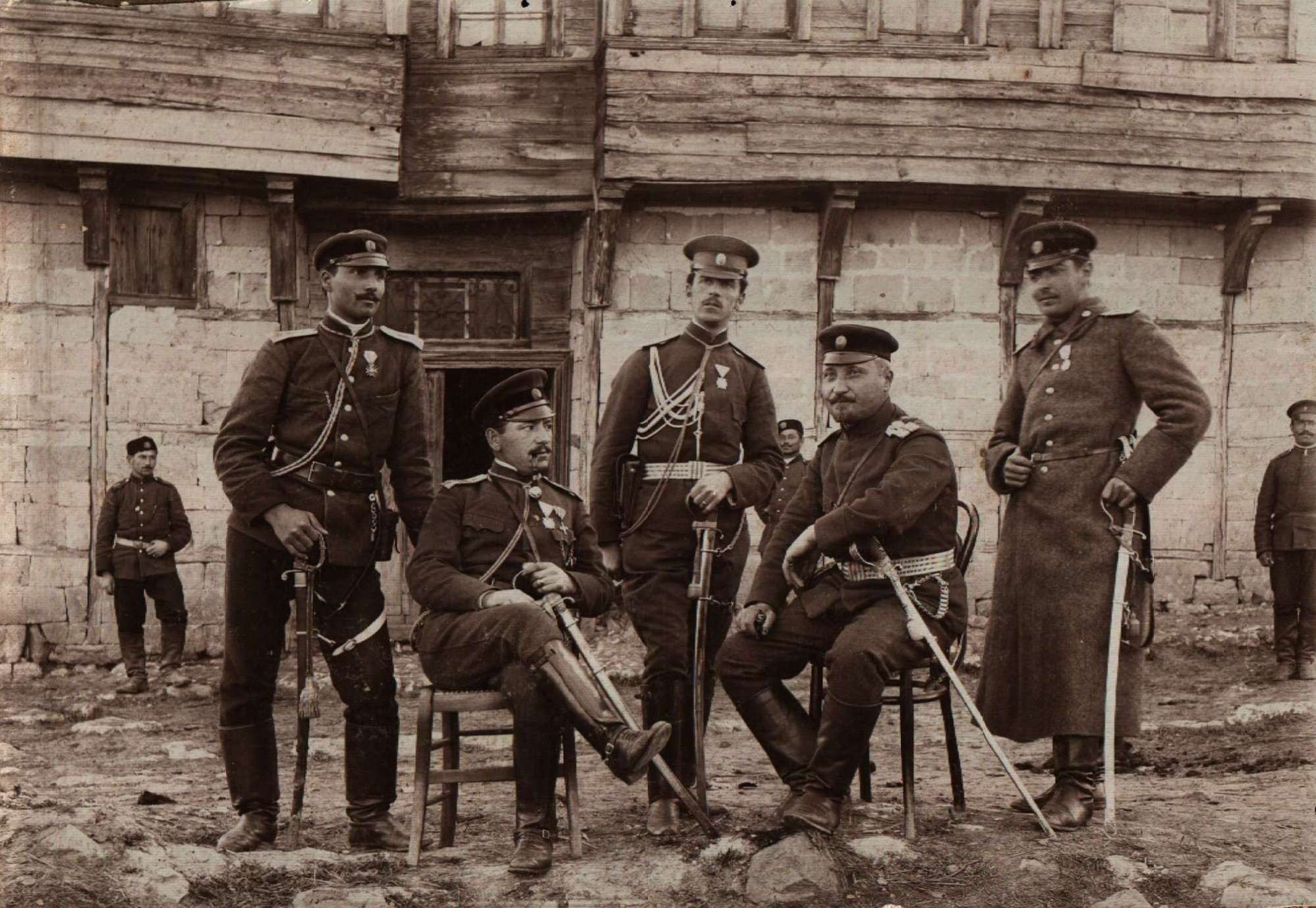
Bulgarian officers in Catalca

The Second Battle of Çatalca fought between 3 February 1913 and 3 April 1913 was a major "continuous skirmish" of the First Balkan War.

== Background ==
The Bulgarian advance at the beginning of the First Balkan War stalled at the Ottoman fortifications at Çatalca in November 1912 at the First Battle of Çatalca. A two-month ceasefire (armistice) was agreed to on 3 December [O.S. 20 November] 1912 to allow for peace talks to proceed in London. The talks there stalled when on 23 January [O.S. 10 January] 1913 an Ottoman coup d'état returned Unionists to power, with their non-negotiable stance on retaking Adrianople. Hostilities resumed upon expiration of the armistice, on 3 February [O.S. 21 January] 1913, and the Second Battle of Çatalca began.

== Battle ==
The battle consisted of a series of thrusts and counter-thrusts by both the Ottomans and the Bulgarians. On 20 February the Ottomans, in coordination with a separate attack from Gallipoli, charged the Bulgarian positions. Although the Bulgarians repulsed the initial attack with support from the Greek Navy in the Thracian Sea, they were weakened enough that they withdrew over fifteen kilometers to the south and twenty kilometers to the west to secondary defensive positions; but eventually the lines returned to essentially the originals. The Bulgarians then moved a section of their army south threatening Çanakkale. The separate siege of Edirne resulted in its loss to the Bulgarians on 26 March, sapping Ottoman morale; and with heavy Bulgarian losses to both fighting and cholera, the battle dwindled down and ceased by 3 April 1913. On 16 April a second ceasefire (armistice) was agreed to, ending the last fighting in the war.

== Results ==
The Ottomans held the "Çatalca Line", but failed to advance. The loss of Edirne ended the major Ottoman objection to peace and the Treaty of London on 10 June 1913 codified the Ottoman loss of territory.
