= Ivan Fichev =

Bulgarian politician and general

Ivan Ivanov Fichev
- Иван Иванов Фичев
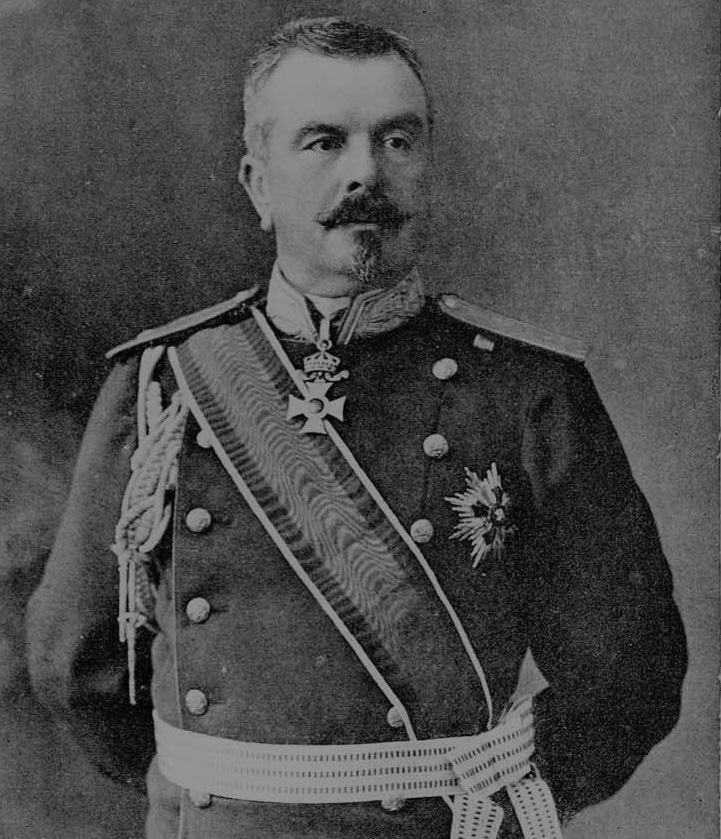
- General Ivan Fichev as Chief of the General Staff

Minister of War of the Kingdom of Bulgaria
- In office 14 September 1914 – 19 August 1915
- Monarch: Ferdinand I
- Prime Minister: Vasil Radoslavov
- Preceded by: Kliment Boyadzhiev
- Succeeded by: Nikola Zhekov

Chief of the General Staff of the Bulgarian Army
- In office 27 March 1910 – 14 January 1914
- Monarch: Ferdinand I
- Preceded by: Atanas Nazlamov
- Succeeded by: Pravoslav Tenev

Commander of the Third Military Inspection District
- In office January 1914 – September 1914
- Monarch: Ferdinand I

Minister Plenipotentiary of Bulgaria to Romania
- In office 1921–1923
- Monarch: Boris III

Personal details
- Born: 15 April 1860 Tırnova, Ottoman Empire (now Veliko Tarnovo, Bulgaria)
- Died: 18 November 1931 (aged 71) Sofia, Bulgaria
- Awards: See below

Military service
- Allegiance: Bulgaria
- Branch/service: Bulgarian Army
- Years of service: 1877–1915
- Rank: Lieutenant General
- Commands: Deputy Chief of the General Staff (1905–1907); 2nd Thracian Infantry Division (1907–1910); Chief of the General Staff (1910–1914); Chief of Staff of the Active Army (1912–1913); Third Military Inspection District (1914)
- Battles/wars: Russo-Turkish War (1877–1878); Serbo-Bulgarian War; Defence of Vidin; First Balkan War; Bulgarian front

Ivan Ivanov Fichev (Bulgarian: Иван Иванов Фичев, born 15 April 1860 – 18 November 1931) was a Bulgarian general, military theorist, and politician. He served as Chief of the General Staff of the Bulgarian Army from 1910 to 1914 and played an important role in planning Bulgarian military operations during the First Balkan War. Fichev took part in the Serbo-Bulgarian War, the Balkan Wars, and the early development of the modern Bulgarian Army. After leaving active military service, he also served as Bulgaria’s Minister of War and later as a diplomat, military historian and academician.

== Early life and Career ==
Ivan Fichev was born in 1860 in Tırnova in the Ottoman Empire (now Veliko Tarnovo, Bulgaria). He was a grandson of the famous architect from the National Revival, Kolyu Ficheto. Fichev studied in Veliko Tarnovo, Gabrovo and in Robert College in Istanbul. However, in 1877, his father died, and Fichev had to return to his home town.

=== Russo-Turkish War of 1877–1878 ===
Soon after he left Robert College, the Russo-Turkish War (1877–1878) began. The young Fichev volunteered for the Bulgarian Volunteer Corps, that is, the six new battalions of the Bulgarian Volunteer Corps, which, unlike the previous six, were formed on Bulgarian soil. The seventeen-year-old volunteer was quickly noticed by the Russian command: he was withdrawn from the 8th Volunteer Battalion and appointed interpreter to the Gabrovo district governor; later, he served as interpreter to the governor of Tarnovo, after which he became secretary to the Tarnovo district chief. In May 1880, he entered the Sofia Military School as a cadet, graduated two years later, was commissioned as a second lieutenant, and was sent to serve in the 20th Varna Infantry Battalion, the 17th Tarnovo Infantry Battalion and as Tarnovo district military chief.

=== Serbo-Bulgarian War ===
During the Serbo-Bulgarian War (1885) lieutenant Fichev commanded a company and took part in the defence of Vidin, where his company operated successfully against Serbian forces.

== Career between 1886–1911 ==
After the war, Fichev served in the 6th Tarnovo Infantry Regiment as a company commander until the dramatic year of 1886, when a coup that dethroned Prince Alexander of Battenberg was followed by a counter-coup headed by the chairman of the National Assembly, Stefan Stambolov. Fichev sided with the supporters of the counter-coup and became one of Stambolov’s close associates. Fichev took part in the welcoming of the returned Battenberg in Ruse and became the prince’s adjutant. This did not last long because Battenberg abdicated later that same month. Fichev then returned to Tarnovo, where he continued his service as an officer in the Tarnovo Regiment.

In February of the following year, when a rebellion of the Ruse garrison broke out against the regime of Stambolov, Fichev took a company of 110 men from the Tarnovo Regiment, arrived in Ruse, and restored order. In 1887, he was promoted to the rank of captain and was sent for a month and a half to the higher military school in Belgium. In 1888, he was summoned to Sofia to participate in reviewing Russian military regulations that had been translated into Bulgarian and was appointed to the commission charged with editing the regulations.

From 1889 to 1891, Captain Fichev studied at the Italian higher military school “SCUOLA GUERRA”, also referred to as the Italian General Staff Academy. In September 1891, he was appointed acting General Staff officer attached to the headquarters of the 1st Infantry Brigade, and in November 1891, he was transferred to the General Staff.

In January 1892, Fichev was promoted to the rank of major and appointed senior adjutant at the headquarters of the 2nd Thracian Division. By 1893, he was also teaching tactics in the division’s training command. Later, Fichev was appointed head of the Training Bureau at the Ministry of War, whose task was to assist in the training of the troops. This was a step in the development of the Bulgarian Army that demonstrated a broader outlook on military affairs. In October 1894, Fichev was removed for two months from his post and from service in the General Staff and appointed battalion commander in the 17th Dorostol Infantry Regiment due to political power struggles following Stambolov’s fall from power.

Superior Military Council of Bulgaria.(Fichev is in the middle roll, on the left edge of the line)

In 1897, Fichev was transferred to Sofia and appointed inspector of classes at the Military School, where he also taught military history and tactics. In 1899, Lieutenant Colonel Fichev was appointed head of a section in the Operations Department of the Army Staff. In 1900, he was again transferred to the General Staff. He took command of the Tarnovo Infantry Regiment and later became chief of the Operations Department of the Army Staff at the beginning of 1903. On 14 January 1903, he was promoted to colonel, and on 15 January 1904, he was appointed chief of staff of the 1st Sofia Infantry Division. By 22 January 1905, he was already assistant chief of the Army Staff. At the beginning of 1907, he commanded the 2nd Thracian Infantry Division, with headquarters in Plovdiv, and the following year he was granted the rank of general. Throughout all this, Fichev continued to devote time to studying foreign military experience and military-theoretical problems.

In 1910, Major General Ivan Fichev was appointed Chief of the Army Staff. From the beginning of the century, Fichev had been entrusted with tasks that contributed to his development and formation as a military commander. He was sent to France to attend the annual manoeuvres in 1902. He took part in the Shipka manoeuvres of the Southern Bulgarian detachment, as well as in the large manoeuvres around Popovo with the Northern detachment in 1904. He attended the Austro-Hungarian manoeuvres in 1907 and the manoeuvres of the Russian army around St Petersburg in 1911. Before the beginning of the First Balkan War, General Fichev was appointed Chief of Staff of the Active Army.

=== Plans for a war against the Ottoman Empire ===
Tsar Ferdinand (left) with Ivan Fichev (right)

One of the most important things carried out by General Fichev as Chief of the Army Staff before the Balkan War was the new operational plan drawn up under his direction. By 1911, three operational plans for war with the Ottoman Empire had been drawn up. The basic idea of these plans was strategic defence followed by an offensive in the Southern (Adrianople) operational theatre. The first task undertaken by Fichev after his appointment as Chief of the Army Staff in May 1910 was to study the operational projects prepared by other generals, combined with trips to the southern frontier, studying the terrain and gathering information on the probable enemy.

The basic idea of the new plan, as Fichev emphasized, was to break with the traditional positional warfare and to conduct an offensive war in both operational theatres, the Macedonian and the Thracian. While the Ottomans mobilized their armed forces more slowly, the Bulgarian army had to seize the initiative, deliver a decisive blow, and in this way reverse the unfavourable balance of power. The concealed 3rd Army had to surprise the Ottoman forces with a manoeuvre and deliver a decisive blow in the Thracian operational theatre. The plan was changed with the establishment of the Balkan League. The new plan of the Bulgarian Army Staff was for an offensive war, with the main forces of the Bulgarian army concentrated in the Thracian theatre and with only one division left in the Macedonian theatre for joint operations with the Serbian army.

== Balkan Wars ==
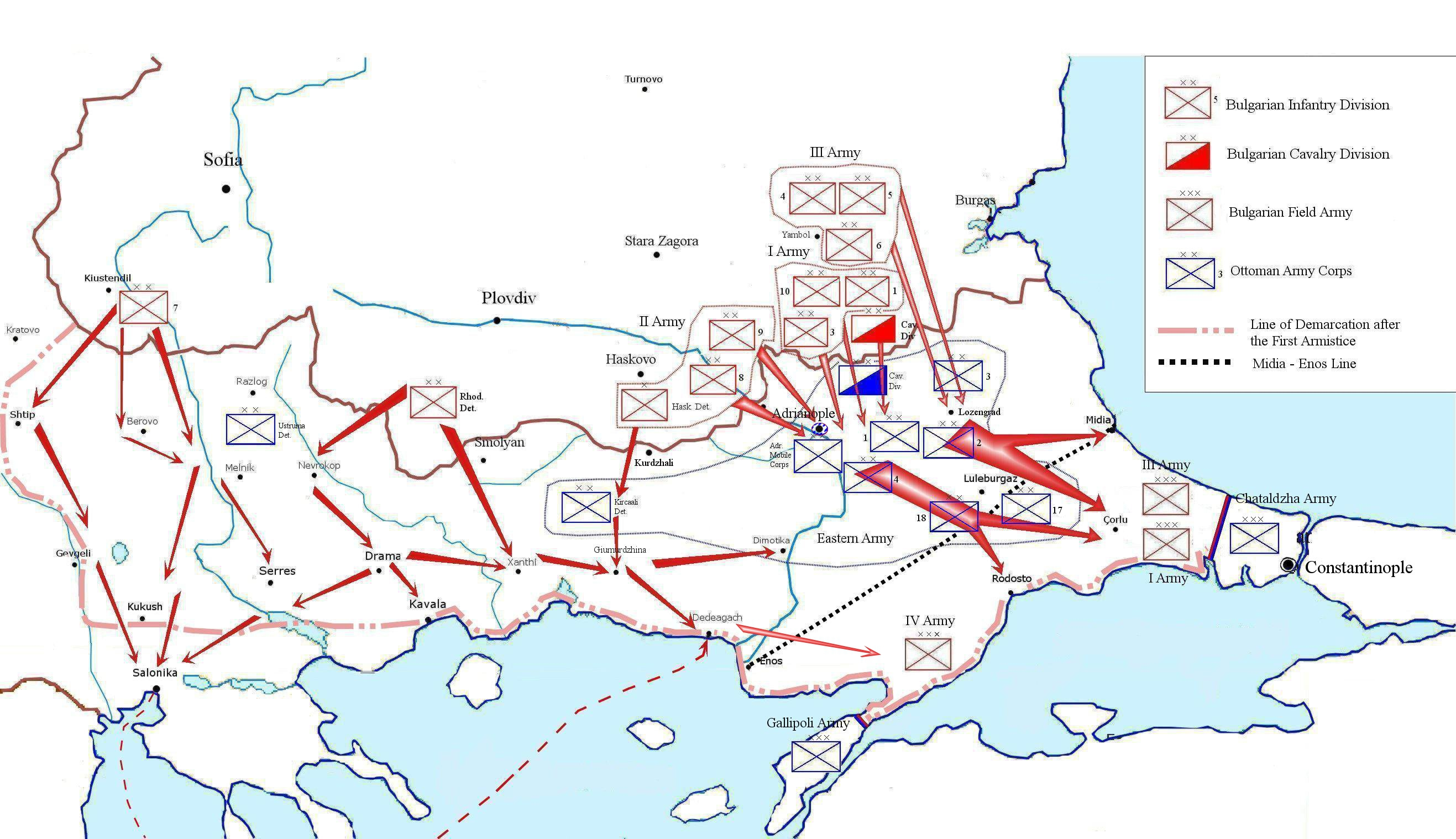
Bulgarian military operations during the First Balkan War

During the First Balkan War (1912–1913) he was the head of the operations in Thrace and fought in the successful battles at Lozengrad and Lule Burgas but after the Bulgarian advance was repulsed at Chataldja only 20 km from the Ottoman capital Istanbul, he fell into disgrace. He was one of the Bulgarian delegates during the negotiations that lead to the signing of the Chataldja Armistice on 3 December [O.S. 20 November] 1912. In May 1913 Fichev resigned from his post as an act of protest but his resignation was not accepted and during the Second Balkan War he remained on the post of Chief of the General Staff of the Army. He also signed the Bucharest Peace Treaty as part of the Bulgarian delegation during the negotiations.

== Latter life ==
After the Second Balkan War, General Fichev continued to serve as Chief of the Army Staff. On 14 January 1914, he was promoted to Lieutenant general and was appointed chief of the Third Military Inspection District, headquartered in Ruse. On 14 September 1914, he was appointed Minister of War. With a view of possible participation in the First World War, Fichev undertook energetic measures for the combat preparation of the army, however, he did not share the optimistic mood of Tsar Ferdinand regarding joining the conflict. At his own request, in 1915, he was discharged from active military service and transferred to the reserve. On 14 February 1915, his daughter was a victim of a bombing attack in Sofia.

In 1921, Ivan Fichev accepted the proposal of the government of the Bulgarian Agrarian National Union to become Bulgaria’s minister plenipotentiary in Romania. He remained in Bucharest for two years. Afterwards, he devoted himself to historiographical work and managed to prepare several works, the most extensive of which was published after his death. He died in Sofia in 1931.

== Awards ==
- Order of Bravery, II grade;
- Order of St Alexander, II grade without swords, III grade and V grade
- Order of Military Merit, I grade and III grade
- Order of Stara Planina, 1st grade with swords - awarded posthumously on 20 December 2012
- French Légion d'honneur, IV grade
- Italian Order of the Crown of Italy, II grade
- Romanian Order of the Star of Romania, III grade
- Persian Order of the Lion and the Sun, II grade

== Sources ==
- Недев, С., Командването на българската войска през войните за национално обединение, София, 1993, Военноиздателски комплекс „Св. Георги Победоносец“
- Симеон Радев:"Конференцията в Букурещ и Букурещския мир от 1913 г.
- Valkov, Georgi (1988). General Ivan Fichev. Izbrani proizvedeniya [General Ivan Fichev: Selected Works] (in Bulgarian). Sofia: Voenno izdatelstvo.

Political offices
Preceded by Kliment Boyadzhiev	Minister of War of Bulgaria; 14 September 1914 – 19 August 1915	Succeeded by Nikola Zhekov
Military offices
Preceded by Atanas Nazlamov	Chief of the General Staff; 27 March 1910 – 14 January 1914	Succeeded by Pravoslav Tenev
