= Kölemen Abdullah Pasha =

Ottoman general in the First Balkan War

Abdullah Kölemen Pasha
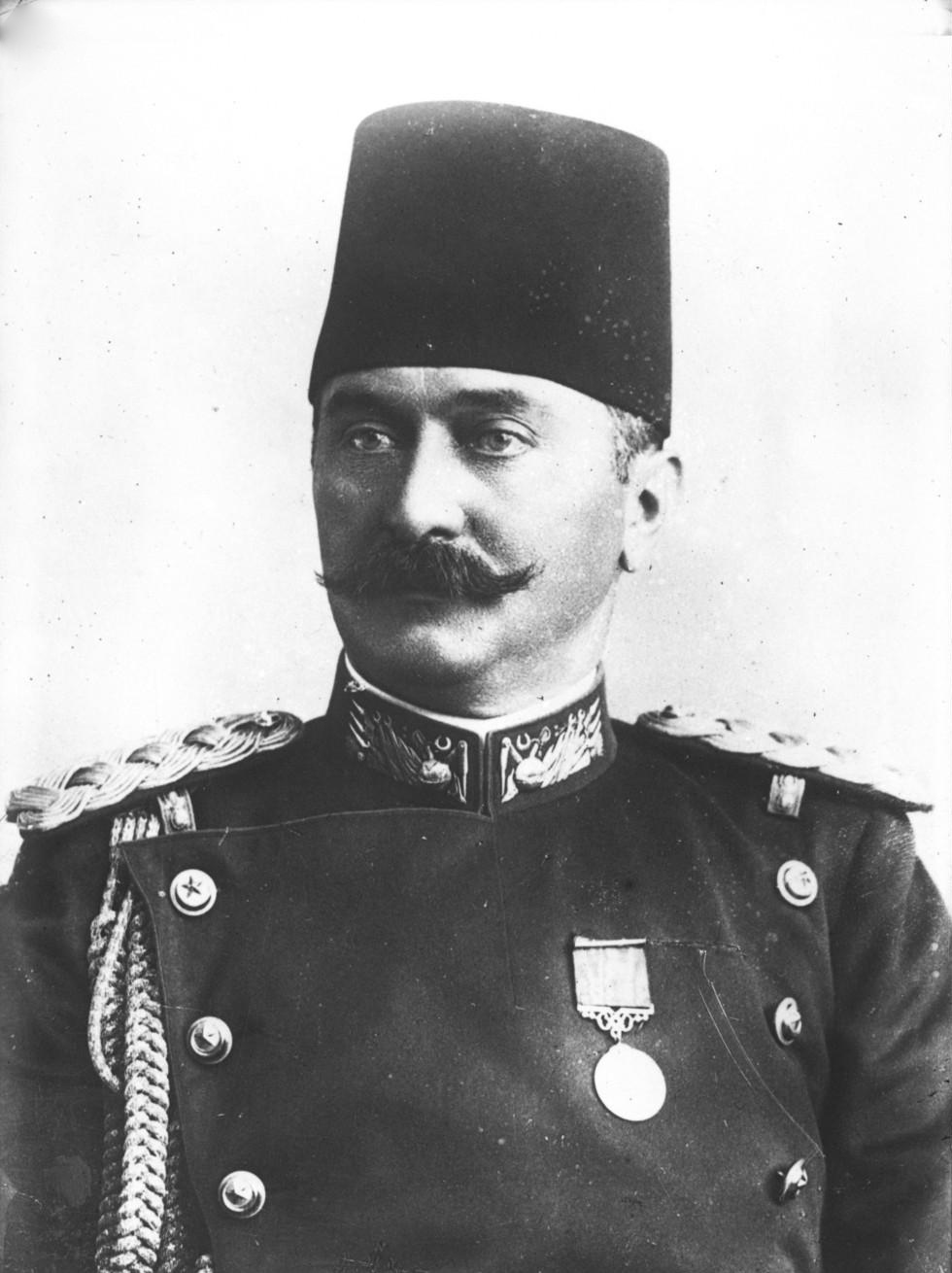
- Kölemen Abdullah Pasha, 1912
- Born: 1846; Trabzon, Ottoman Empire
- Died: 1937 (aged 91); İzmir, Turkey
- Military career
- Allegiance: Ottoman Empire
- Branch: Ottoman Army
- Service years: 1881–1913
- Rank: General
- Commands: 4th Army; Anatolia Garp Army; The Eastern Army in Eastern Thrace
- Conflicts: Greco-Turkish War; First Balkan War; Bulgarian Front; Battle of Kirk Kilisse; Battle of Lule Burgas; Siege of Adrianople (1912–1913); Turkish War of Independence; Greco-Turkish War (1919–1922)
- Awards: Imtiyaz Medal
- Other work: Minister of Defence of the Ottoman Empire

Abdullah Pasha or Abdullah Kölemen (Turkish: Kölemen Abdullah Paşa; 1846–1937) was an Ottoman Turkish general in the First Balkan War, notable as the Ottoman commander in the Battle of Kirk Kilisse in 1912, the Battle of Lule Burgas, and the Siege of Adrianople (1912–1913) in which the Ottoman forces were defeated by the Bulgarians.

He was the Minister of War (Turkish: Harbiye Nazırı) of the Ottoman Empire for 38 days between 11 November and 19 December 1918 in the cabinet of Ahmet Tevfik Pasha. He later resigned from the cabinet and joined the Turkish War of Independence where he fought against the Greeks in Smyrna. He died in 1937 in İzmir.
