= Yttertavle =

Coordinates: 63°47′N 20°23′E

Yttertavle is a small locality situated in Umeå Municipality, Västerbotten County, Sweden, with 75 inhabitants in 2005.

The Tavlefjärden Nature Reserve lies directly east of the village.
