= Radko Dimitriev =

Bulgarian general (1859–1918)

Radko Ruskov Dimitriev
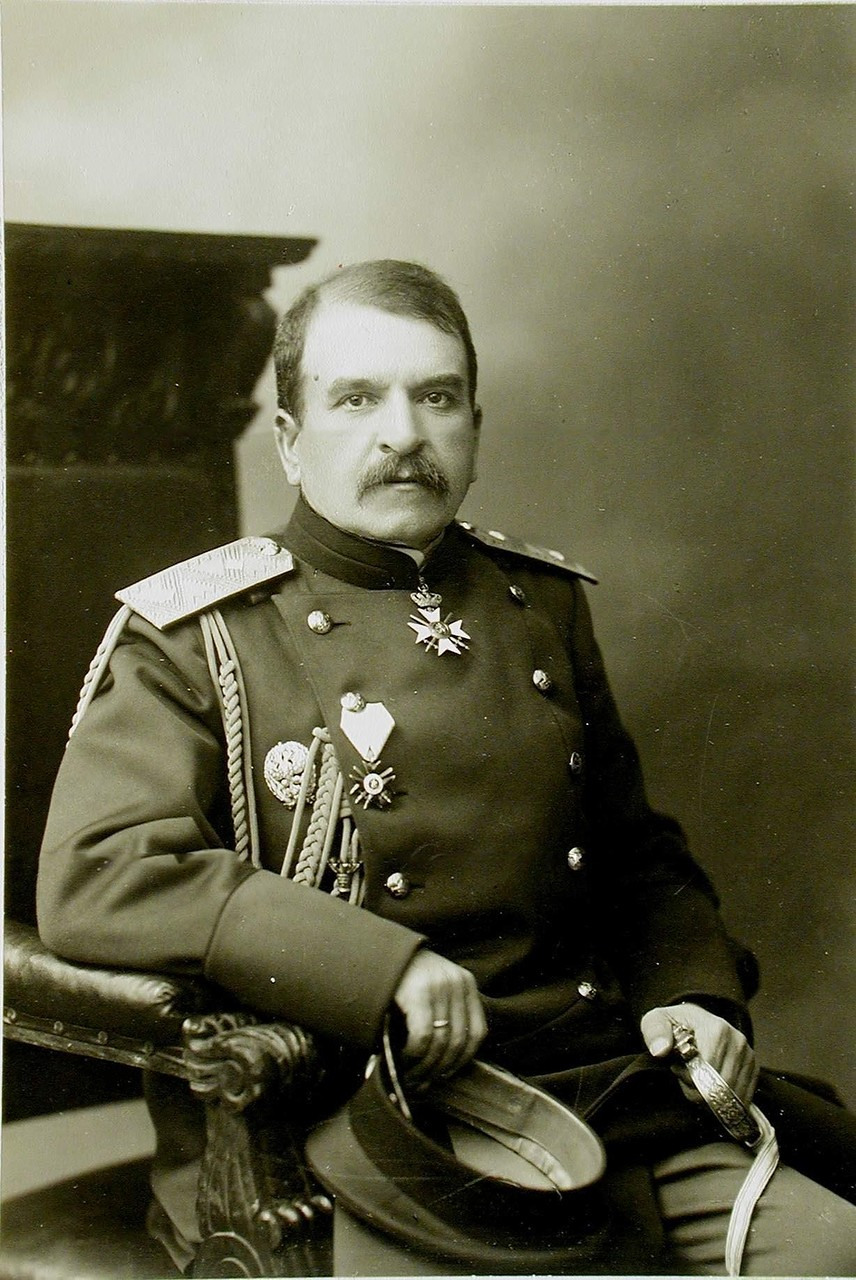
- Born: 24 September 1859; Gradets, Ottoman Empire (now Bulgaria)
- Died: 18 October 1918 (aged 59); Pyatigorsk, Russian Soviet Federative Socialist Republic
- Military career
- Allegiance: Kingdom of Bulgaria; Russian Empire
- Branch: Bulgarian Army (Russian Empire) Imperial Russian Army
- Service years: 1877–1886; 1898–1913; 1914–1917
- Rank: Lieutenant General
- Commands: Bulgarian 3rd Army; Russian 3rd Army; Russian 12th Army
- Conflicts: Serbo-Bulgarian War; Battle of Pirot; First Balkan War; Bulgarian front; Battle of Kirk Kilisse; Battle of Lule Burgas; First Battle of Çatalca; Second Balkan War; First World War; Battle of Galicia; Siege of Przemyśl; Gorlice–Tarnów offensive
- Awards

Radko Ruskov Dimitriev (Bulgarian: Радко Русков Димитриев; Russian: Радко Дмитриевич Радко-Дмитриев; 24 September 1859 – 18 October 1918) was a Bulgarian general who served as the head of the General Staff of the Bulgarian Army from 1 January 1904 to 28 March 1907, as well as a general in the Russian Army during World War I.

== Biography ==
He was born in the village of Gradets (Sliven Province) and was raised by his grandmother in Kotel. He later studied in the Aprilov Gymnasium in Gabrovo and participated in the organization of the April Uprising (1876).

During the Russo-Turkish War of 1877–1878, he was a translator in the 2nd Guards Division of the Russian Army. In 1879, he graduated the Military School in Sofia; in 1881, Dimitriev was promoted to a Lieutenant and in 1884 he became Captain after graduating the Saint Petersburg Academy. When only a captain he was one of the pro-Russian officers involved in the plot to kidnap Prince Alexander of Battenberg and force his abdication in 1886, for which he was exiled by Prime Minister Stefan Stambolov. He then served for ten years in the Russian army, and only returned to Bulgaria after the fall of Stambolov.

During the Serbo-Bulgarian War (1885), Dimitriev was one of the commanders of the Western Corps and participated in the successful Battle of Pirot. After the war he took part in an unsuccessful coup d'état; emigrated to Romania and became a member of the club of the Emigrant Officers. Later he emigrated to Russia and served in the Russian Army.

He returned to Bulgaria in 1898, and became a second in command in the 5th Danube Infantry Division. On 18 May 1900, he was promoted to Colonel and was the Head of the General Staff of the Bulgarian Army from 1904 to 1907. On 2 August 1912, Radko Dimitriev was promoted to Lieutenant General.

During the First Balkan War (1912–1913), he was in command of the 3rd Army which decisively defeated the Ottoman Empire at Lozengrad and Lule Burgas in Thrace.

During the Second Balkan War in 1913, he replaced general Mihail Savov as deputy commander-in-chief. Later that year after the end of the war he was sent as a Minister Plenipotentiary to Saint Petersburg, Russia.

== First World War ==
During the First World War (1914–1918) he served in the Russian Army as a commander of a corps. At the beginning of spring 1915, Radko Dimitriev commanded the 3rd Army in Galicia facing the Austrians along the line of Gorlice-Tarnów. His role was to hold the line while the Russian 11th and 12th armies in Bukovina renewed the offensive through the Carpathians towards Hungary.
In April 1915 despite knowing that German troops had replaced those of Austro-Hungary in the area of Gorlice, Radko Dimitriev had made no preparations to counter a German offensive or fortify his positions. The trenches in his sector were crude and in many places there was no second line of defence. In the breakthrough area of Gorlice 5½ Russian divisions (60,000 men) of poorly trained conscripts faced the 10 German divisions of the 11th army under Mackensen with 700 guns including many of heavy caliber, while the Russians had only 140 light field guns.

The concentrated bombardment which opened the Gorlice–Tarnów Offensive on 2 May 1915 tore the front open, but initially General Alexeev at Stavka refused to take the offensive seriously; Stavka remained convinced that main German attack would come in the north, and were focused on their own offensive in the south. A Russian counterattack was ordered by Stavka and took place at Dokra Pass on 7 May 1915 but this became a senseless massacre. Consequently, much of the 3rd Army was either cut off or destroyed by the time Stavka allowed Radko Dimitriev to order a retreat on 10 May 1915, and only 40,000 out of an army of 200,000 reached the River San. Radko Dimitriev claimed correctly that his army had been "bled white" but was removed from command 2 June 1915 and replaced by General Leonid Lesh.

Sir Bernard Pares, who met Radko Dimitriev several times when he was covering the war on the Eastern Front, and knew him well, described him thus:

"General Radko Dimitriev is a short and sturdily built man with quick brown eyes and a profile reminiscent of Napoleon. He talks quickly and shortly, sometimes drums on the table with his fingers, and now and then makes a rapid dash for the matches. The daily visit of the Chief of the Staff is short, because, as the General says on his return, simple business is done quickly. Every piece of his incisive conversation holds together as part of a single and clear view of the whole military position, of which the watchword is 'Forward'."

After he was appointed to fight against the Ottomans in the Caucasus campaign out of favour, he was reappointed in late 1916 to command the 12th army on the Riga front, but in summer 1917 Alexeyev dismissed his commander-in-chief at the front, Ruszky, and the army commander Radko Dimitriev, for weakness and indulgence to the soldiers' committees that had sprung up everywhere after the February Revolution in 1917.

Radko Dimitriev fled to the resort town of Pyatigorsk in the North Caucasus. There in October 1918 he was executed by the Bolsheviks.

== Bibliography ==
- Недев, С., Командването на българската войска през войните за национално обединение, София, 1993, Военноиздателски комплекс „Св. Георги Победоносец“, 57–58.
- Димитров, И., Съединението 1885 – енциклопедичен справочник, София, 1985, Държавно издателство „д-р Петър Берон“, 92–93.
- Бутаков, Я., Как болгарский посол стал русским генералом
