= Battle for Knjaževac =

Engagement during the Second Balkan War, 1913

- Part of Second Balkan War
Date	4–7 July 1913
Location	Knjaževac, Kingdom of Serbia 43.5667°N 22.2500°E
Result	Bulgarian victory

Belligerents
Kingdom of Bulgaria	Kingdom of Serbia

Commanders and leaders
Vasil Kutinchev	Vukoman Aračić

Units involved
First Army	Timok Army

Strength
Approx. 56,700 men 108 guns	One division engaged (Šumadijska II Division); Part of 40,000 men and 68 guns under the Timok Army

Casualties and losses
280 dead, 820 wounded during combat; approx. 5,000 killed during withdrawal ambush	Unknown

The Battle for Knjaževac was a minor engagement during the Second Balkan War between the Bulgarian 1st Army and Serbian forces near the town of Knjaževac, fought from 4 to 7 July 1913. Although Bulgarian troops captured the town after heavy fighting, a strategic withdrawal was ordered the next day. Elements of the retreating force were then ambushed by Serbian artillery, resulting in severe losses.

== Background ==
The Battle for Knjaževac occurred during the Second Balkan War, which broke out in June 1913 after Bulgaria launched a surprise attack against its former allies, Serbia and Greece, over territorial disputes in Macedonia. Bulgarian high command hoped to regain initiative by striking Serbian positions along the eastern frontier.

== Engagement ==
In early July 1913, General Vasil Kutinchev’s 1st Army was ordered to shift from a defensive posture in north-western Bulgaria to a limited offensive across the River Timok. The aim was to disrupt Serbian planning by threatening the Timok valley and drawing off Serbian reserves from the southern theatre.

The Bulgarian operation was designed as a two-pronged advance: one force would move northward, while the other would push west toward the town of Zaječar. The town of Knjaževac, located close to the frontier, was a necessary objective for securing the left flank and maintaining supply lines. The Bulgarian 1st Army fielded approximately 56,700 men and 108 guns.

Facing them was the Serbian Timok Army under General Vukoman Aračić. The defence of Knjaževac fell to the Šumadijska II Division, while the remainder of Aračić’s force, including reserves and artillery, was concentrated around Zaječar and Pirot. The total Serbian strength in the area was estimated at 40,000 men and 68 guns. The Bulgarian assault began on 4 July and, after several days of heavy fighting, succeeded in taking Knjaževac on 7 July. Bulgarian combat casualties were reported as 280 dead and 820 wounded.

== Aftermath ==
Despite this tactical success, worsening conditions elsewhere in the war forced Bulgarian high command to order a general withdrawal the next day. During the retreat, the Bulgarian 9th Plevenska Division was ambushed by Serbian artillery in a narrow ravine and suffered catastrophic losses, with approximately 5,000 Bulgarian soldiers killed.

General Kutinchev and his staff remained in the theatre until 17 July before redeploying south to reinforce other sectors. Command of the northern front passed to the 9th Division, which attempted to hold the area against Serbian pressure.

== Sources ==
- Hall, Richard C. (2002). "Bulgarian retreats". The Balkan Wars 1912–1913: Prelude to the First World War. Routledge. p. 116. ISBN 978-1-134-58362-1.
- Stoyanov, Aleksandar (2015). Istoriya na voynite: Balkanskite voyni na balgarskata armiya [History of the Wars: The Balkan Wars of the Bulgarian Army] (in Bulgarian). Sofia: Milenium. ISBN 978-954-515-328-0.
- Hooton, E. R. (24 January 2017). Prelude to the First World War: The Balkan Wars 1912-1913. Fonthill Media. pp. 300–303.
