= Vukoman Aračić =

Serbian general

Vukoman Aračić (Serbian Cyrillic: Вукоман Арачић; 10 May 1850 in Lanište, Principality of Serbia – 12 February 1915 in Užice, Kingdom of Serbia) was a Serbian general and a hero of the Balkan Wars, celebrated for his victories at the Battle of Knjaževac and the Siege of Vidin.

== Biography ==
Aračić was born in the village of Lanište, in the Jagodina district, to parents Petar and Stevana. He completed four grades of elementary school in Jagodina and six grades of high school in Kragujevac, graduating in 1869. Following this, he enrolled in the Artillery School of the Military Academy, where he finished ninth grade, graduating in 1874 with a ranking of seventh out of 20 cadets. Notably, he was in the same class as the renowned General Božo Janković, who became the liberator of Kosovo in 1912, and General Leonid Solarević.

During the First Serbian-Turkish War, he served as an adjutant for the general staff of the Timok Corps. In the Second Serbian-Turkish War (1877–1878), he held the position of chief of staff for the Jagodina Brigade. On 29 December 1877 (11 January 1878 in the new calendar), he led his fellow countrymen into the Niš Fortress and participated in the battles at Samokov.

For the next two years, he held the rank of Captain of the 2nd Class and served as an ordnance officer for the Šumadija Division. As a state cadet, Aračić traveled to Vienna in 1880 to study engineering, remaining there until 1882. After his return from Vienna, he became the Chief of Staff of the Engineering Regiment. In 1885, he was promoted to Captain I Class in the general staff profession, and just before the war against the Bulgarians, he was appointed Chief of Staff of the Drina Division of the 1st Call. In October 1887, he was named Commander of the 6th Infantry Battalion.

In April of the following year, he assumed the role of acting head of the External Department within the Operations Department of the General Staff. Throughout the 1890s, he undertook various responsibilities in central military administration. His positions included Acting Chief of the Operations Department of the Ministry of War, Deputy Chief of the General Staff, Chief of the General Military Department of the Ministry of War, and Assistant Chief of Staff of the Active Army Command.

From 1890 to 1903, he served as the commander of the Danube Divisional Area. In March 1895, he took on multiple roles, including commander of the IX Infantry Regiment, chief of the operational department of the General Staff, and commander of the IV Command of the Šumadija Divisional Area. Starting from April 1902, he became the commander of the Timok Divisional Area and honorary adjutant to King Alexander Obrenović. Additionally, from August 1901, he was a member of the Higher Military Council.

From 1893 to 1903, with minor interruptions (specifically from 12 September 1893 to 1 September 1896; 21 June 1897 to 1 March 1899; 26 March 1900 to 18 August 1901), he served as a professor at the Military Academy. In both part-time and full-time roles, he taught Military Geography and the History of War Skills at the lower level, as well as Tactics and General Staff Service with War Games at the higher course. Additionally, in 1893 and 1901, he was a member of the academic council of the institution. As both president and a member, he also participated in the commissions responsible for administering the non-commissioned officer and officer exams.

From October 1900 to October 1901, he served as the editor of the military magazine Ratnik. Earlier, in 1898, he briefly edited the Official Military Gazette. In 1895, he was a member of the military court of cassation.

He authored the books Oreography Around Our Country on the Balkan Peninsula (1898) and General Staff Service of the War (1899, COBISS.SR 167911948). In 1914, he prepared the manuscript for General Staff Service of Peacetime, but it was not published due to the outbreak of war.

Additionally, he was one of the founders of the first equestrian club in Šumadija, the Šumadija Regional Riders' Circle Knez Mihailo Obrenović, which was established in 1898.

== Balkan Wars ==
In 1912, at the onset of the Balkan Wars, Aračić was activated as a reserve general staff colonel and reappointed as the commander of the Timok divisional area. During the First Balkan War, his region did not experience significant conflicts. However, his exceptional command abilities were fully realized during the Second Balkan War in 1913, following the Bulgarian raid on Bregalnica in June. At that time, he mobilized the people of the Timok Valley, including conscripts from the second and third call-ups, as well as older and younger men designated for Last Defense.

With the units he formed at Planinka, Aračić successfully repelled the Bulgarian offensive on 23 and 24 June. By 2 July 1913, he launched a counterattack. His forces captured Kula, liberated Belgrade, and advanced to the vicinity of Vidin, where they initiated a siege. For these operational successes, Colonel Vukoman Aračić was promoted to the rank of general on 1 November 1913, and returned to active duty. The city of Zaječar honored him by declaring him an honorary citizen, and he was awarded the highest military decoration, the Order of Karađorđe's Star with swords.

== World War I ==
During World War I, General Aračić effectively commanded the Timok Division of the Second Call and the Šumadija Division of the First Call during the liberation of Šabac on 10 August 1914 and at the Battle of Cer. His troops dealt significant blows to the enemy on the bloody Parašnica during the battle on the Drina.

On 29 September 1914, Aračić was appointed commander of the Užice army amidst the ongoing Battle of the Drina. In October and November 1914, he led his forces in engagements at Senković, Paklinka, Točionik, Babjak, and Semeć. After advancing into eastern Bosnia and inflicting heavy losses on the enemy, his units were compelled to withdraw to the Ovčar-Kablar Gorge due to strategic considerations following the fall of Čačak on 12 November 1914.

During the Battle of Kolubara, Aračić he commanded operations along the line from Varda to Veliki Prisedo, Kadinjača, and Ponikve. The Užice army secured its right flank alongside the left flank of the First Army, allowing for significant progress in the Serbian army's counter-offensive in that sector. Pursuing the enemy, Aračić's troops successfully entered Užice on 29 November 1914. On the night of 2-3 December, the 17th Infantry Regiment was moved from Ovčar to Kablar, successfully breaking through the following night. Despite suffering from poor health, General Aračić continued to lead the army from the site where the memorial fountain now stands, all the way to the Kamenica River.

Following the victorious Battle of Kolubara, General Aračić focused on creating the best possible conditions for the recovery of his soldiers, who were afflicted by an epidemic of spotted typhus. In his battle against the disease, which he contracted from Austro-Hungarian prisoners of war, he ultimately succumbed. General Aračić died on 12 February 1915 and was buried in Užice. On 25 February 1925, with the highest state honors, his remains were transferred to the family tomb at Belgrade New Cemetery.

== Legacy ==
Novo Lanište has a railway station, established by General Vukoman Aračić, that is still in operation today. During the interwar period, the station was known as Aračićevo.

In 1937, a memorial fountain featuring a bust of the general was erected in the village of Jančići, near Čačak, and it still stands today.

== Awards and decorations ==
- Order of Miloš the Great, II class
- Royal Order of Karađorđe's Star with swords, IV class
- Order of the Cross of Takovo with swords, 5th class
- Order of the Cross of Takovo, II and III class
- Royal Order of the White Eagle, III and V class
- Silver Medal for Bravery
- Medal for Military Virtues (Kingdom of Serbia)
- Silver Medal for Zealous Service (1913)
- Medal for Bravery
- Commemorative War Memorial of 1876–1878
- Russian -Order of St. Stanislaus with swords of the 3rd class
- Montenegro - Order of Prince Danilo I, 3rd class
- French - Order of the Legion of Honour

== Bibliography of papers ==
- General Staff Service of the War , Part 1, Belgrade 1899. COBISS 167911948.
- "General Staff Service of Peacetime", part 2, (completed in 1914. unpublished).
- "Service in the headquarters of the Serbian army in peacetime", Ratnik, vol. 33 (1895), vol.1 (July), p. 56.
- Project for service in the headquarters of the Serbian army , Ratnik, book. 34 (1896), vol. 3 (March), p. 257.
- Mobilization and concentration of the army , Ratnik, vol. 36 (1897), vol. 1 (January), p. 1.
- "Nutrition and maintenance of the army in combat readiness during the war", Ratnik, vol. 37 (1897), vol. 5 (November), p. 561; book 37 (1897), vol. 6 (December), p. 727.
- Report on French Corps and Army Maneuvers , Ratnik, vol. 37 (1897), vol. 5 (November), p. 545; book 37 (1897), vol. 6 (December), p. 689.
- "Orography around our country", Warrior, vol. 38 (1898), vol. 1 (January), p. 33; book 38 (1898), vol. 2 (February), p. 158.
- "Quick Determination" (translation), Official Military Gazette, 1883, p. 898-902, 927–932, 957–964, 1023–1028, 1097–1100, 1151–1156.

== Literature ==
- General Vukoman Aračić: Commander of the Uzice Army , [B. M.]: Printing House of the Supreme Command of the Operational Department, [1915], COBISS 133819404
- Aračić, Vukoman , article - integral part, Aleksandar Ž. Zivotic, Belgrade, 2010 COBISS 522025623
- Lectures of the General Staff Service of Peace and War on our course of the Military Academy in the school year 1897/8 , Vukoman Aračić, Belgrade: Military Academy, 1898 COBISS 167912972
- Službeni vojni list , magazine, Belgrade: Državna štamparija, COBISS 36679692
