= Battle of Kirk Kilisse =

1912 battle of the First Balkan War

Battle of Kirk Kilise
- Part of the Bulgarian front of the First Balkan War
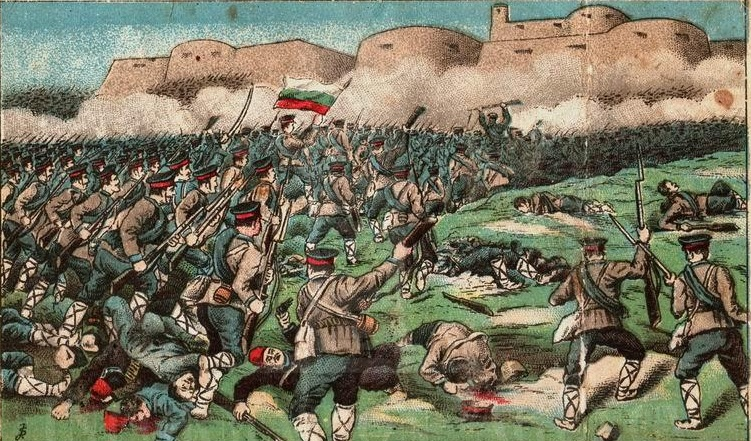
- An illustration of the Battle of Kirk Kilisse
Date	22–24 October 1912
Location	Kırk Kilise District, Adrianople Vilayet, Ottoman Empire (now Kırklareli, Turkey) 41°44′05″N 27°13′31″E
Result	Bulgarian victory

Belligerents
Bulgaria	Ottoman Empire

Commanders and leaders
(Bulgaria) Radko Dimitriev (Bulgaria) Vasil Kutinchev	Mahmud Muhtar Pasha (WIA); Abdullah Pasha

Strength
(Tsardom of Bulgaria (1908–1946)) 1st Bulgarian Army – 79,370 men (Tsardom of Bulgaria (1908–1946)) 3rd Bulgarian Army – 94,884 men Total: 174,254 men	(Ottoman Empire) Ottoman I Corps – 20,000 men (Ottoman Empire) Ottoman II Corps – 14,000 men (Ottoman Empire) Ottoman III Corps – 38,000 men (Ottoman Empire) Ottoman IV Corps – 20,000 men Total: 92,000 men

Casualties and losses
5,745 casualties; 887 killed; 4,034 wounded; 824 missing	3,500–4,500 casualties; 1,500 killed and wounded, 2,000–3,000 prisoners; 58 artillery captured

The Battle of Kirk Kilisse or Battle of Kirklareli or Battle of Lozengrad was part of the First Balkan War between the armies of Bulgaria and the Ottoman Empire. It took place on 22–24 October 1912. Bulgarian forces of the First and Third Armies defeated the Ottoman Eastern Army and captured Lozengrad. The victory forced the Ottoman forces to retreat toward the Lüleburgaz–Bunarhisar line and opened much of northern Thrace to the Bulgarians.

== Prelude ==
The Bulgarian operational plan in Eastern Thrace sought to defeat the principal Ottoman field army before reinforcements from Anatolia could significantly alter the balance of forces. The Bulgarian Second Army under Nikola Ivanov was assigned to contain and eventually besiege the fortress of Adrianople, while the Bulgarian First Army under Vasil Kutinchev advanced between Adrianople and Lozengrad. The Bulgarian Third Army, commanded by Radko Dimitriev, was hidden behind the Bulgarian cavalry division and was intended to deliver the principal blow against the Ottoman army. This concealment formed a crucial part of the Bulgarian plan to achieve strategic surprise. Bulgaria possessed the strongest and most extensively trained army among the Balkan allies, with a comparatively large body of trained reservists and modern artillery and small arms.

Following the declaration of war on 18 October 1912, the Bulgarian armies crossed the Ottoman border. The initial advance encountered little resistance, while the Bulgarian command continued to obscure the position and intended role of the Third Army. Ottoman intelligence initially misjudged the Bulgarian deployment and expected the main advance to follow the valleys of the Arda and Maritsa. Only shortly before the opposing forces made contact did the Ottoman command establish that large Bulgarian formations were advancing east of the Tundzha. The speed of the Bulgarian concentration was itself an important advantage: the Bulgarian General Staff calculated that the Ottomans would not be able to concentrate approximately 200,000–250,000 men in Thrace before the beginning of November, whereas the Bulgarian armies were already in position by mid-October.

The Ottoman command had originally planned a defensive campaign in Eastern Thrace until reinforcements arrived from Anatolia. Minister of War Nazım Pasha however insisted onoffensive action, influenced by contemporary doctrines that emphasized aggressiveness and by a desire to gain the initiative before the Bulgarian offensive developed fully. This decision was opposed by some Ottoman officers, who preferred the defensive positions farther south. Many Ottoman reserve formations were understrength and inadequately trained, while transportation and mobilization were hampered by poor communications and the autumn weather.

On 21 October the Bulgarian high command ordered the Second Army to lay before Adrianople, while the First Army covered the movement of the Third Army and covered the area east of the fortress. The Ottoman command, finally aware that substantial Bulgarian forces had appeared east of the Tundzha, ordered an advance from the Lozengrad–Adrianople line. During these preparations a difference emerged within the Bulgarian high command: Chief of the General Staff Ivan Fichev feared the possibility of a major Ottoman counterstroke against the Bulgarian right, whereas Assistant Commander-in-Chief Mihail Savov remained confident that the Bulgarian offensive would succeed.

On the morning of 22 October the Ottoman Eastern Army advanced northward. Abdullah Pasha wanted to strike the Bulgarian armies before their deployment has been completed and to envelop the flanks of the Bulgarian offensive. The Ottoman force extended from Adrianople on its left to Lozengrad on its right, while its cavalry occupied the broad interval between the fortress and the field corps. The first encounter developed unexpectedly for both armies into a major battle along a front of roughly 60 km.

== Battle ==
The battle began on 22 October as the Ottoman advance clashed with the forward elements of the Bulgarian First Army. The First Army faced the greater part of the Ottoman Thracian forces southwest of Lozengrad, while the Second Army moved against Adrianople to prevent its garrison from intervening in the battle. Farther east, Dimitriev's Third Army approached Lozengrad after a rapid march through the difficult terrain of the Strandzha region. Over six days the Third Army covered roughly 120 km, despite poor roads, rain and the need to move artillery and supply columns through difficult country.

Map of the battle

In the early hours of 22 October General Fichev instructed Dimitriev not to start poorly prepared attacks on Lozengrad and to establish the Ottoman strength before committing to an assault. Dimitriev at first also planned to approach the fortress methodically, occupying forward positions before attempting a combined infantry and artillery assault. The battle, however, rapidly developed beyond these plans. Bulgarian and Ottoman formations encountered one another at several points including Petra, Erikler, Geçkinli and Seliolu, and both sides committed increasingly large forces to the engagement.

The Bulgarian First Army bore the heaviest fighting during the initial Ottoman offensive. It repulsed an Ottoman assault from the direction of Adrianople and advanced into the gap between the fortress and the Ottoman field armies. At the same time, the Third Army defeated an attempt against its left flank, while the Bulgarian cavalry operated between the First and Third armies. The fighting was complicated by inadequate reconnaissance on both sides, and numorous times formations entered combat without a complete picture of the opposing dispositions. Heavy rain further reduced visibility, damaged roads and impeded the movement of artillery and supply columns.

Bulgarian infantry repeatedly employed attacks in poor light and at close range, supported by artillery and machine guns. Bayonet assaults accompanied by the war cry "Na nozh!" ("By knife!") became particularly characteristic of the fighting. These tactics proved effective against Ottoman formations whose discipline and morale were already uneven. The Ottoman III Corps had shortages of trained officers and non-commissioned officers, poorly prepared reservists and suffered repeated outbreaks of panic; the bad weather, mud and disruption of transport further reduced cohesion among units. The Bulgarian night attacks and bayonet charges contributed to panic among Ottoman reserve formations and accelerated the breakdown of their positions.

Radko Dimitriev and his staff at Lozengrad

On 23 October Bulgarian artillery gained superiority at several points, while the fighting around Seliolu and Geçkinli threatened the connection between the First and Third armies. Dimitriev initially prepared reinforcements for the threatened sector, but as the situation developed he decided to increase the pressure toward Lozengrad itself. Bulgarian units took the intiative to exploit local successes without always waiting for new orders. Near the village of Gerdeli an Ottoman attack was repulsed in close combat, with Dimitriev personally intervening in the fighting and leading elements of the 15th Lom Regiment forward. On the Bulgarian left the 5th Danube Division seized the heights of Karakol despite orders that at first called for a halt. The advance threatened the Ottoman position around Lozengrad and contributed to the deterioration of the Ottoman right. Meanwhile, the 4th Preslav Division defeated several Ottoman formations around Petra and drove them back towards Lozengrad and Kavakli. The absence of enough Bulgarian heavy artillery made an assault on the Lozengrad fortifications difficult, but the battlefield situation was already making such an assault unnecessary.

By the evening of 23 October the Ottoman command was beginning to lose control of large parts of its army. Mahmud Muhtar Pasha reported the loss of Petra and the withdrawal of his forces, while the Ottoman Eastern Army began falling back toward the Bunarhisar–Luleburgaz area. During the night the retreat became increasingly disorganised. Rearguards and small detachments remained near Lozengrad, but large numbers of Ottoman troops abandoned positions, equipment and artillery as they withdrew through rain and mud. The Ottoman retreat was made further worse by weak discipline, the disruption of baggage columns and the psychological effect of Bulgarian artillery, machine-gun fire and infantry assaults.

On the morning of 24 October Bulgarian artillery opened fire but received little or no reply. Reconnaissance patrols advancing toward the fortifications discovered that the Ottoman army had abandoned Lozengrad. Dimitriev entered the town at about 11:30, where the Bulgarian troops were greeted by parts of the population and church bells were rung to mark the occupation.

== Aftermath ==
The battle ended in a major Bulgarian victory and the collapse of the first Ottoman defensive line in Eastern Thrace. The defeat had an immediate effect on Ottoman morale and command. Mahmud Muhtar Pasha blamed poor organization, weak discipline among the reserves and the prolonged rain for the defeat. Abdullah Pasha's confidence also collapsed; on 25 October he informed Muhtar Pasha that with the army in its current condition it appeared impossible to continue the war successfully and suggested that the government seek a diplomatic solution. The loss of Lozengrad exposed northern Thrace and forced the Ottoman army to withdraw towards a new defensive line around Lüleburgaz and Pınarhisar.

The victory also demonstrated the military brilliance of the Bulgarian strategic surprise. The Ottoman command failed to identify the Third Army's location in time, while the Bulgarian rapid advance placed a large force on the Ottoman flank before the Eastern Army had completed its own concentration. Further more it reinforced Bulgarian confidence in aggressive infantry tactics, such as night attacks and bayonet assaults. The result was the first major Bulgarian victory of the campaign and strongly influenced expectations regarding the subsequent course of the war.

The Bulgarians did not, however, exploit the Ottoman retreat immediately. Dimitriev wanted a more energetic pursuit, but exhaustion, the condition of the roads, and the lagging supply columns complicated further movement. Fichev criticized the failure to press the retreating enemy, while Dimitriev argued that his troops required rest and that the logistical situation made an immediate large-scale pursuit difficult. The cavalry also lost contact with the retreating Ottoman formations. Historian Ricahrd C. Hall argued that a more aggressive pursuit at this stage might have transformed the Ottoman defeat into a more complete collapse, since the Eastern Army was severely disorganized.

The pause of military action on the part of the Buglarian army allowed Ottoman reinforcements arriving from Constantinople to restore order and form a second defensive line along the ridges between Lüleburgaz and Bunarhisar. This pattern, Bulgarian victories followed by pauses for exhausted troops and supply columns to catch up, would recur during the Thracian campaign and repeatedly gave retreating Ottoman forces time to reorganize. The Bulgarian advance resumed shortly afterward, leading directly to the much larger Battle of Lule Burgas.

== Sources ==
- Ministerstvo na voynata, Shtab na voyskata (1928). Voynata mezhdu Balgariya i Turtsiya, vol. II [The War Between Bulgaria and Turkey, vol. II] (in Bulgarian). Sofia: Darzhavna pechatnitsa.
- Markov, Georgi (2012). Balgariya v Balkanskiya sayuz sreshtu Osmanskata imperiya, 1911–1913 [Bulgaria in the Balkan League against the Ottoman Empire, 1911–1913] (in Bulgarian). Sofia: Zahariy Stoyanov. ISBN 978-954-09-0725-3.
- Hall, Richard C. The Balkan Wars 1912–1913: Prelude to the First World War. Warfare and History. London: Routledge, 2000. ISBN 978-0-415-22947-0.
- Borodziej, Włodzimierz; Górny, Maciej (2021). Forgotten Wars: Central and Eastern Europe, 1912–1916. Studies in the Social and Cultural History of Modern Warfare. Translated by Tilbury, Jasper. Cambridge: Cambridge University Press. doi:10.1017/9781108938495. ISBN 978-1-108-83715-6.
- Ivetic, Egidio. Балканските войни [The Balkan Wars]. Translated by Velimira Kostova-Varlakova. Sofia: Ciela Norma, 2012. Originally published as La guerre balcaniche (Bologna: Società editrice il Mulino, 2006). ISBN 978-954-28-1202-9. (in Bulgarian)
