= Vasil Kutinchev =

- Васил Кутинчев
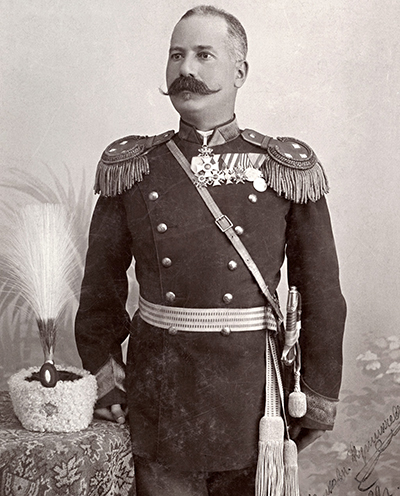
- Lieutenant General Vasil Kutinchev
- Born: 25 February 1859; Rusçuk, Ottoman Empire
- Died: 30 March 1941 (aged 82); Sofia, Bulgaria
- Military career
- Allegiance: Bulgaria
- Branch: Bulgarian Army
- Service years: 1879–1918
- Rank: General of the Infantry
- Commands: 1st Army (1912–1913); 2nd Army (1913); Morava Military Inspection District (1915–1917)
- Conflicts: Serbo-Bulgarian War; Battle of Slivnitsa; Battle of Pirot; First Balkan War; Bulgarian front; Battle of Kirk Kilisse; Battle of Lule Burgas; First Battle of Çatalca; Second Battle of Çatalca; Second Balkan War; Battle for Knjaževac; Battle of Kresna Gorge; World War I
- Awards

Vasil Ivanov Kutinchev (Bulgarian: Васил Иванов Кутинчев) was a Bulgarian military officer and General of the Infantry. A graduate of the Military School in Sofia, he served in the Bulgarian Army from 1879 to 1918 and took part in the Serbo-Bulgarian War, the First and Second Balkan Wars, and the First World War. During the First Balkan War, Kutinchev commanded the Bulgarian First Army on the Thracian theatre of operations against the Ottoman Empire, including the battles of Kirk Kilisse and Lule Burgas. He later took command of the Second Army during the closing stages of the Second Balkan War. He was promoted to General of the Infantry in 1918.

== Biography ==
He began his military career in 1879 after graduating from the Military School in Sofia . On 13 September 1885 he was made commander of the 1st battalion of the 5th "Dunav" infantry regiment.

He took part in the Serbo-Bulgarian War of the same year and on 8 November was promoted to commander of the 5th regiment. Captain Kutinchev fought in the Battle of Slivnitsa, Dragoman, Tsarevbrod and Pirot.

After the war he served as commander of various infantry regiments and was promoted to Major General in 1904. Four years later Kutinchev was appointed commander of the First Army Region which comprised the western parts of Bulgaria.

On 2 August 1912 Tsar Ferdinand in honour of the 25th anniversary of his arrival to Bulgaria promoted six Major Generals to the rank of Lieutenant General. One of those generals was Kutinchev. This is the first time in the history of the Bulgarian Kingdom when such high ranks were awarded to officers of the Active Army. Until then it was given to officers of the reserve.

With the outbreak of the First Balkan War General Kutinchev was made commander of the First Army which took part in the important battles of Kirk Kilisse, Lule Burgas and Çatalca.

After the end of that war the entire army had to be transferred to Northwestern Bulgaria were during the Second Balkan War it saw service against the Serbs. Meanwhile, on 16 July 1913 Kutinchev took the command of Second Army. On this post he remained until the end of hostilities.

During the First World War he was a general in the General Staff of the Active Army and commander of the newly created Army Region of Morava. In one final act of recognition of his service in October 1918 Lieutenant General Vasil Kutinchev was promoted to General of the Infantry which was the highest military rank in the Bulgarian Army and went into the reserve. He died in Sofia in 1941.

== See also ==
- List of Bulgarian generals in the Kingdom of Bulgaria
