= Battle of Lule Burgas =

1912 battle of the First Balkan War

- Part of the Bulgarian front of the First Balkan War
- Map of the Battle of Lule Burgas-Bunarhisar (Bulgarian forces in red, Ottoman in blue)
Date	28 October – 2 November 1912
Location	Burgos, Kirk Kilise District, Adrianople Vilayet, Ottoman Empire (present-day Lüleburgaz-Bunarhisar, Turkey) 41°24′20″N 27°21′25″E
Result	Bulgarian victory

Belligerents
Bulgaria	Ottoman Empire

Commanders and leaders
(Bulgaria) Radko Dimitriev (Bulgaria) Vasil Kutinchev	Abdullah Pasha; Mahmud Muhtar Pasha

Strength
108,000; 116 machine guns; 360 guns	129,500; 90 machine guns; 342 guns

Casualties and losses
20,162 casualties; 2,536 killed; 17,626 wounded	24,800 casualties; 22,000 killed and wounded; 2,800 captured; 50 guns captured

The Battle of Lule Burgas (Turkish: Lüleburgaz Muharebesi) or Battle of Luleburgas – Bunarhisar (Bulgarian: Битка при Люлебургас – Бунархисар, Turkish: Lüleburgaz – Pınarhisar Muharebesi) took place between the Kingdom of Bulgaria and the Ottoman Empire and was the bloodiest battle of the First Balkan War. The battle took place from 28 October to 2 November 1912. The outnumbered Bulgarian forces made the Ottomans retreat to Çatalca line, 30 km from the Ottoman capital Constantinople. In terms of forces engaged it was the largest battle fought in Europe between the end of the Franco-Prussian War and the beginning of the First World War.

== Prelude ==
After the Bulgarian victory at Lozengrad, the Bulgarians decided to rest their armies for 2–3 days instead of immediately pursuing the enemy. Even the Bulgarian cavalry division rested instead of screening the Ottoman retreat. The Bulgarian Headquarters would soon realize this decision was a mistake. The demoralized Ottoman forces were retreating in disorder, abandoning guns, baggage trains and anything else that might slow them down. After a fight some 20 kilometres south of Lozengrad by the 2nd Vidin Brigade, contact with the Ottoman forces was virtually lost.

Mahmud Muhtar Pasha, after realizing the Bulgarians did not pursue him, started to reorganize the Ottoman forces, restoring order and establishing a new defensive position around the 30-kilometre-long Lüleburgaz–Bunarhisar line. The new defensive position stretched from the Ergene River past the villages of Lyule Burgas and Bunarhisar and included shallow trenches along an extended ridge, which favoured the Ottoman defences. Reinforcements from Constantinople further strengthened the Ottomans, and officers had somewhat restored discipline among the Ottoman soldiers. The Ottoman artillery batteries, stretched along the entire line, were positioned at unequal distances from each other.

General Radko Dimitriev urged the Bulgarian High Command to order a general advance, but had been denied this request by Generals Savov and Fichev. General Fichev did not wish to order the army forward due to poor logistics, bad reconnaissance and uncertainty about the number of Ottoman soldiers, as well as the fact that Adrianople still could not be completely encircled by the Second Bulgarian Army, forcing the Bulgarians to redeploy the III Division to the rear of the Bulgarian armies in order to protect them from a sortie by the Ottoman garrison at Adrianople, reducing the Bulgarian strength to some 108,000 men. Regardless, the advance of the Bulgarian army resumed on 27 October, with the Third Bulgarian Army advancing rapidly, leading to its separation from the First Bulgarian Army.

The newly reinforced with well-trained and highly motivated soldiers 130,000-strong Ottoman army was divided into two armies: the 1st Army, positioned around Lyule Burgas, under the command of Abdullah Pasha, and the 2nd Army, positioned around Bunarhisar under the command of Hamdi Pasha, with Abdullah Pasha retaining overall command of the Ottoman Thracian Army. Abdullah Pasha’s plan was to hold his left line and centre while sweeping around the Bulgarian flank with his right.

Upon learning the Ottoman forces were positioned around Lüleburgaz, the Bulgarian General Staff issued new plans of operation. The overall objective was to roll up and drive the Ottomans toward Viza, placing the Black Sea behind their backs and destroying the Ottoman Army decisively. To do this, the Bulgarian Third Army was to pin the Ottoman forces on the Lüleburgaz–Bunarhisar line, while the Bulgarian First Army (commanded by General Vasil Kutinchev) was to conduct a flanking manoeuvre and defeat the Ottoman left flank.

== Battle ==
On 28 October, skirmishing between Bulgarian and Ottoman soldiers began around the village of Kolibi Karagach. On 29 October, the Bulgarian Third Army attacked the Ottomans along the entire front from Lüleburgaz to Bunarhisar. The 4th Preslav Division assaulted the Ottoman batteries on the heights around Karaağaç. The Bulgarians managed to break through the Ottoman positions with a bayonet charge and capture 36 guns, but suffered heavy casualties in the process, and insufficient number of troops prevented further advances. Fighting throughout the day near the village of Mandra-Kuliba, the right column of the 5th Danube Division carried out a flanking manoeuvre, successfully driving back the Ottoman forces. Despite the success, however, the two brigades were ordered to withdraw instead of entrenching and waiting for the 4th Preslav Division, after which they would both attack the centre of the Ottoman line.

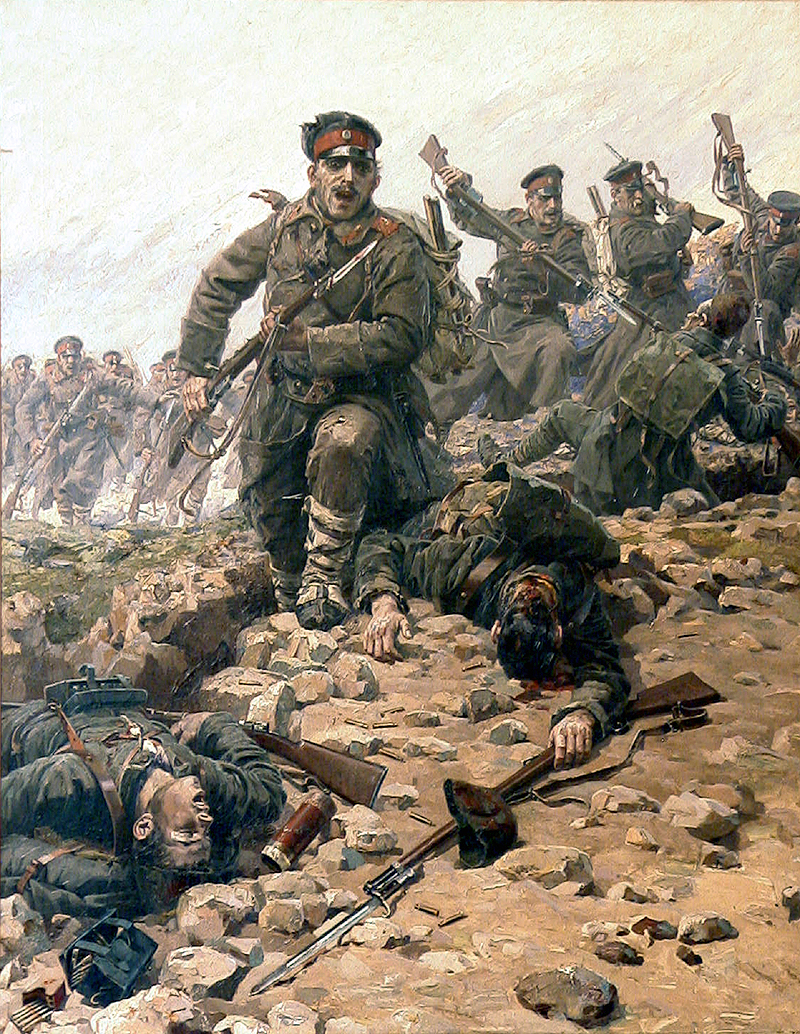
"Bulgarians overrun the Ottoman positions à la bayonette", by the Czech painter Jaroslav Věšín.

On 29 October, the Bulgarian 2nd Danube Brigade encountered Ottoman formations near Viza, meeting heavy resistance and artillery fire. Realizing the strength of the Ottomans in front of him, General Dimitriev requested that General Kutinchev come to his aid as quickly as possible and envelop the Ottoman left flank, while his Third Bulgarian Army made a frontal advance. The Bulgarian troops renewed their attempts to advance, but met fierce resistance. During the day, units of the First Army reached the area of operations, with the Tenth Infantry Combined Division (commanded by Major General Stoyu Bradistilov) deployed at the southwesternmost end of the front. However, the Ottoman forces continued to resist and even launched limited counterattacks. The situation of the Fourth Division was particularly critical, with all reserves involved in the battle.

On 30 October, around 50,000 Ottoman soldiers advanced against the 5th Danube Division, supported by heavy artillery fire. The heights between the Soudjak and Karaağaç rivers became contested between the Bulgarians and Ottomans and changed hands multiple times. After several attacks and counterattacks by both sides, however, the Ottoman numerical superiority and artillery support finally drove back the Bulgarians, forcing them to withdraw some 6–7 kilometres and entrench themselves on the hills east of Bunarhisar. The Bulgarian Headquarters decided to temporarily combine the 1st and 3rd Armies into a single army group under the command of General Dimitriev. Savov sent an order to General Kutinchev to subordinate himself to the commander of the 3rd Army and assist him as much as possible.

On 31 October, General Dimitriev, now the commander of the United Armies, sent an order to General Kutinchev to attack the Ottoman left flank in the Lüleburgaz–Satıköy direction as energetically as possible and drive the Ottoman army toward Strandzha, while the 3rd Army was to pin the Ottomans in place and deny them the ability to reinforce their left flank. The 1st Bulgarian Army then, despite being slowed down by fog, managed to break through the Ottoman positions and began advancing eastward, driving the Ottomans back along the entire front facing the 1st Bulgarian Army. Further advances by the 6th Vidin Division around Satıköy forced the Ottoman formations into a disorderly retreat, which was not pursued because the Bulgarian artillery had lagged behind. The Bulgarian generals wanted to pursue the retreating Ottomans in order not to give them a moment to recover; however, General Fichev ordered them to halt so that the armies could be put back into order and prepared for further operations.

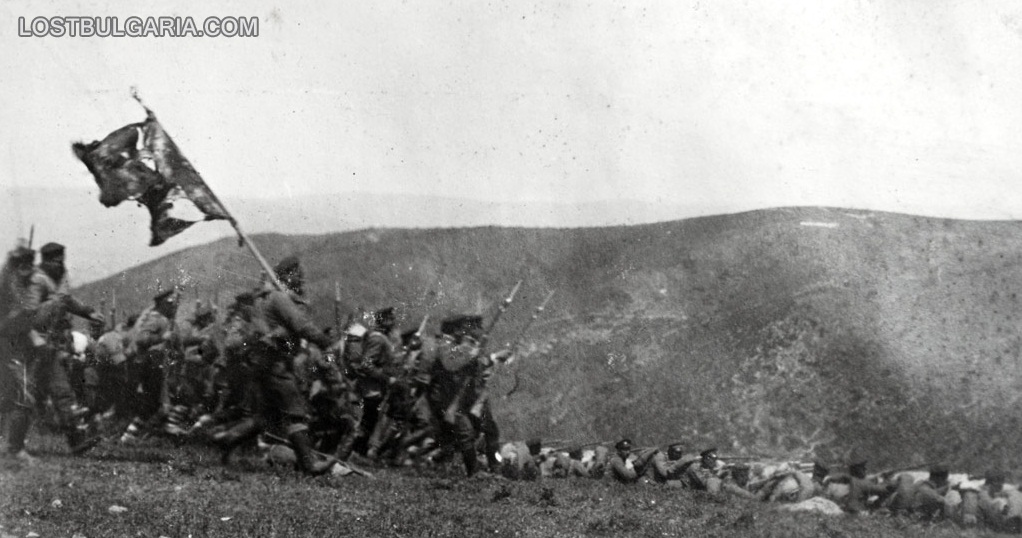
A Bulgarian bayonet charge at Lule Burgas

On 1 November, the 4th Preslav Division, using the momentum of the Bulgarian breakthrough, attacked the Ottomans around Chongora and halted an Ottoman attack against the 5th Danube Division. The Preslav Division, capturing the Karaağaç–Soudjak positions, defeated Mahmud Muhtar Pasha's final attempt to break through the Bulgarian positions toward Bunarhisar–Lozengrad. On the night of 2 November, the Ottoman troops launched a general retreat, which remained unnoticed by the Bulgarian command. The Bulgarian troops lost contact with the enemy, with a large part of the Ottoman forces managing to retreat to the fortified positions at Çatalca. In the Çatalca operation two weeks later, they stopped the Bulgarian offensive.

The Ottoman army suffered a decisive defeat. Their losses amounted to 22,000 dead and wounded, with the greatest casualties occurring in the 1st Eastern Army. In addition, they left behind 45 cannons, and over 2,000 soldiers were taken prisoner by the Bulgarians. The Bulgarian Army also suffered heavy losses. They sustained 20,162 casualties, including 2,534 dead, with the majority of losses occurring in battles against the Ottoman 2nd Army, mainly in the sector of the Bulgarian 3rd Army.

== Aftermath ==
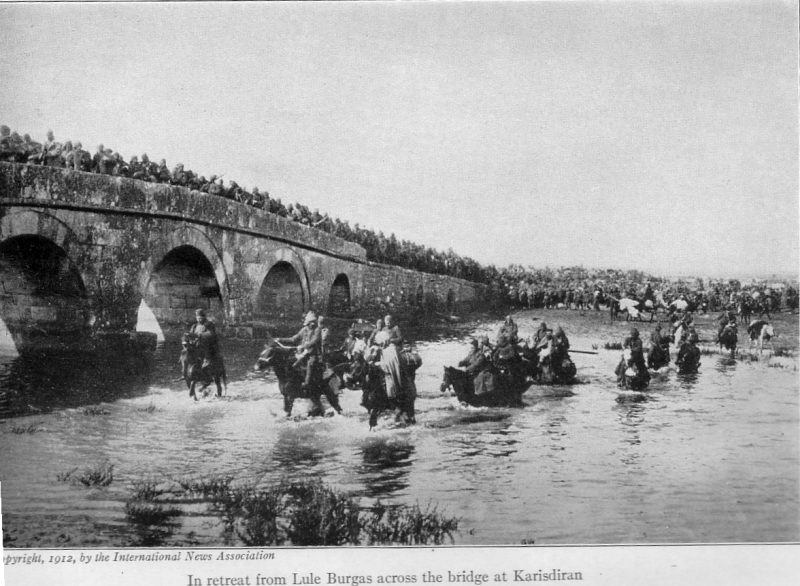
Ottoman troops in retreat from Lule Burgas across the bridge at Karisdiran

The Battle of Lüleburgaz–Bunarhisar was the second major defeat for the Ottomans in Thrace. The loss of all of Thrace, with the exception of Adrianople, combined with the heavy casualties, a completely collapsed logistical system (including food, water and medical supplies), and the disorganized retreat, proved to be an even greater disaster than the defeat suffered at Lozengrad. During their disorganized retreat, the Ottoman situation became even worse with the outbreak of several diseases, such as a cholera epidemic, which was made even worse as thousands of refugees fled towards the safety of Constantinople, causing thousands of deaths.

Once again, the Bulgarians failed to immediately pursue the defeated Ottoman armies. Despite beating the Ottoman army twice, the Bulgarians remained in their positions for five days, uncertain of the strategic situation at hand. The victory caught the Bulgarian command unprepared, as General Fichev's plans extended only as far as the Ergene River. It was assumed that by now the Great Powers would have intervened in the war and stopped it. The Bulgarian army at last set out and marched as far as Çatalca. The Bulgarian army had become exhausted, suffering from bad supplies, stretched lines of communication and an emerging cholera epidemic. Regardless of the difficulties, the Bulgarian High Command started discussing an eventual attack against the Ottoman positions at Çatalca.

== Sources ==
Media related to Battle of Lule Burgas at Wikimedia Commons

- Mitrany, David (2008). The Balkans: A History of Bulgaria, Serbia, Greece, Rumania, Turkey. Aristophanes Press. ISBN 978-1-4097-6731-2.
- Fichev, Ivan (1927). Vissheto komanduvane prez Balkanskata voyna 1912 g.: Ot nachaloto na voynata do Chataldzha vklyuchitelno [The High Command during the Balkan War of 1912: From the Beginning of the War to Çatalca Inclusive] (in Bulgarian). Sofia: Pechatnitsa na Armeyskiya voenno-izdatelski fond.
- Vachkov, Aleksandar (2005). Balkanskata voyna 1912–1913 [The Balkan War 1912–1913] (in Bulgarian). Sofia: Anzhela. ISBN 978-954-90587-2-7.
- Bulgarian Ministry of War (1937). Voynata mezhdu Balgariya i Turtsiya 1912–1913 g. Tom 1: Podgotovka na voynata [The War between Bulgaria and Turkey, 1912–1913. Volume 1: Preparation for the War] (in Bulgarian). Sofia: Darzhavna pechatnitsa.
- Hayta, Necdet; Birbudak, Togay S. (2010). Balkan Savaşları'nda Edirne [Edirne during the Balkan Wars] (in Turkish). Ankara: Genelkurmay Basımevi. ISBN 978-975-409-595-1.
- Hall, Richard C. (2000). The Balkan Wars, 1912–1913: Prelude to the First World War. Routledge. ISBN 0-415-22946-4.
- Erickson, Edward J. (2003). Defeat in Detail: The Ottoman Army in the Balkans, 1912–1913. Greenwood Publishing Group. ISBN 0-275-97888-5.
- Stoyanov, Aleksandar (2015). Istoriya na voynite: Balkanskite voyni na balgarskata armiya [History of the Wars: The Balkan Wars of the Bulgarian Army] (in Bulgarian). Sofia: Milenium. ISBN 978-954-515-328-0.
- Markov, Georgi (2012). Balgariya v Balkanskiya sayuz sreshtu Osmanskata imperiya, 1911–1913 [Bulgaria in the Balkan League against the Ottoman Empire, 1911–1913] (in Bulgarian). Sofia: Zahariy Stoyanov. ISBN 978-954-09-0725-3.
