= First Battle of Çatalca =

Battle fought between the Ottoman Empire and Bulgaria during the First Balkan War

Battle of Çatalca
- Part of the Bulgarian front of the First Balkan War
- Map of the battle
Date	17 and 18 November [O.S. 4–5 November] 1912
Location	Çatalca Line 41°08′30″N 28°27′47″E
Result	Ottoman victory

Belligerents
Bulgaria	Ottoman Empire

Commanders and leaders
Radko Dimitriev	Nazım Pasha

Strength
176,430 men (118,092 rifles, 146 MGs, 462 guns, 56,410 animals, 20 aircraft)	140,571 men (103,514 rifles, 62 MGs, 316 guns, 22,058 animals, 5–8 aircraft)

Casualties and losses
12,012 casualties; 1,482 killed; 9,129 wounded; 1,401 missing	5,000–10,000 killed and wounded

The First Battle of Çatalca was one of the heaviest battles of the First Balkan War fought between 17 and 18 November [O.S. 4–5 November] 1912. It was initiated as an attempt of the combined Bulgarian First and Third armies, under the overall command of lieutenant general Radko Dimitriev, to defeat the Ottoman Army stationed in Çatalca and break through the last Turkish defensive line before the capital Constantinople. The high casualties however forced the Bulgarians to call off the attack.

== Battle ==
The first Bulgarian units reached the Çatalca position on 30 October and immediately began preparations for an attack. The Bulgarian command's plan envisaged delivering the main blow on the left flank with an auxiliary blow in the central sector of the front, the aim being to break the defensive line and push the enemy towards the Sea of Marmara.

On 17 November, at 5 a.m., while it was still dark, four Bulgarian divisions began their advance against the fortified positions at Enikyoy, Katırdzhisu and Karasu. The fierce fighting that developed was observed by Generals Savov and Dimitriev, accompanied by officers of the 3rd Army headquarters. It became apparent from the beginning that the Ottoman artillery was operating much more effectively, while the Bulgarian guns were lagging behind and could not match its effect. The 3rd Balkan Division, despite being severely affected by cholera, was tasked with delivering the main blow against the Ottoman right flank. General Dimitriev kept the 5th Danube Division in readiness to assist in accordance with the development of the fighting. The Balkan Division managed to capture the village of Lazarköy and the surrounding heights, but was forced to dig in there due to heavy Ottoman rifle, machine-gun and artillery fire.

The advance of the 9th Pleven Division encountered heavy Ottoman artillery fire and was also forced to dig in 300–400 paces in front of the Ottoman fortifications. Regardless, the 4th Pleven Regiment still managed to capture the fortification near the village of Chanakcha. The Ottoman artillery was better positioned and thus more effective, while the Bulgarian batteries, being 5–6 km behind the front line, could not effectively support the infantry attacks.

The 1st Army, after a short artillery preparation, also began its movement forward; however, the 1st Sofia Division came under heavy Ottoman crossfire from the forts Bahchesh Tabiya, Gur Tabiya and Hamidiye 2. The 6th Bdin Division had more success, crossing the river and reaching some 600–700 paces from the fortifications Hamidiye 1 and Hamidiye 2, but suddenly Ottoman long-range artillery also began firing on the Bdin Division. This made General Kutinchev ask for howitzer reinforcements, but these were denied by the commander of the United Armies. General Dimitriev ordered Kutinchev to assume a defensive posture and wait for the action of the 3rd Army. General Dimitriev still thought the attack could continue and ordered General Kutinchev to form a reserve on the left flank of the 1st Army, while the 3rd Balkan Division, reinforced by a brigade from the 4th Preslav Division, was to attack and break through the Ottoman positions. For this purpose, the Bulgarian batteries were also pushed forward in order to better assist the attack against the fortified positions.

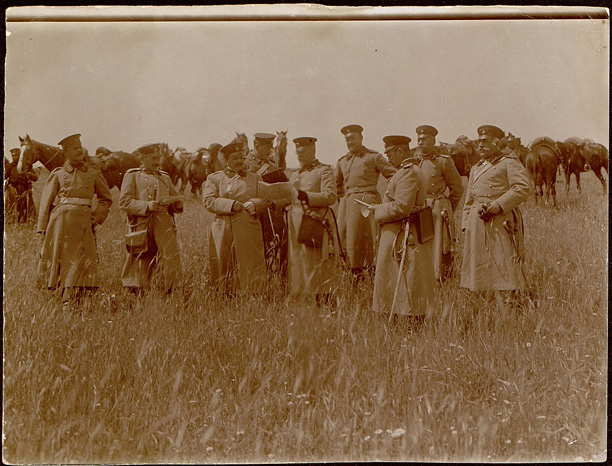
Radko Dimitriev and his staff at Catalca

At the headquarters of the United 1st and 3rd Armies, a debate began over whether to continue the attack for another day or two or to wait for Adrianople to fall, after which, with the assistance of the Bulgarian siege artillery, another attempt would be made to break through the Ottoman positions. However, after the 3rd Balkan Division captured Fortification No. 2 and the 9th Pleven Division captured the trenches between Fortification No. 7 and the village of Chimachke, hopes of breaking the enemy and achieving success were revived. General Dimitriev ordered the successes against the Ottoman right flank to be developed further. He planned for the 3rd Balkan Division, supported by one Danube brigade, to advance into the fog, which would paralyse the Ottoman artillery. The Bulgarians then attacked the heights between Lake Derkos and the Black Sea and advanced 4 kilometres. The main Ottoman forces were concentrated on the right wing of the fortifications opposite the 3rd Balkan Division.

The commander of the United Armies ordered the 1st Army to attack in the direction of Hamidiye–Mahmudiye and to capture some of the strongholds, thereby easing the situation of the 3rd Balkan Division, where fierce fighting was taking place. After complete darkness had fallen, the Sofia Brigade conducted a night attack, captured several Ottoman machine-gun nests and found itself 600–700 paces in front of the forts Ahmed Pasha, Hamidiye 1 and 2, and Mahmudiye, which promptly opened a powerful artillery barrage against the brigade. The 1st Sofia Division, with artillery support, advanced without encountering serious resistance. The Bulgarian advance, although difficult and accompanied by heavy casualties, continued against the Çatalca line. After heavy fighting, parts of the 9th Pleven Division entered the Ottoman trenches north of Fort Mesheli, but came under intense crossfire and were forced to retreat. The commander of the United Armies, observing the retreating Bulgarians, began to lose faith in the possibility of a breakthrough. The observed retreat of troops from the 9th Division, combined with news of other local Bulgarian retreats from some of the already captured positions, made General Dimitriev order the offensive operations to stop and the troops to dig in, despite having several combat-ready divisions in reserve.

Further south, however, the commander of the 1st Army had not yet received the order to stop the attack, and the fighting in his sector continued. Slowly, the 1st Army advanced very close to the Ottoman defensive lines, while artillery and infantry preparations were made for the capture of the forts Hamidiye 2 and Mahmudiye. General Kutinchev requested information from the Headquarters of the Active Army about the situation of the 3rd Army, to which General Fichev replied with astonishment as to why the two armies did not maintain communication with each other. After General Kutinchev learned that the 3rd Army had gone over to the defensive, he ordered the 1st Army's attack to stop, and its troops were ordered to entrench themselves on their current positions.

== Aftermath ==
Historian Georgi Markov states that the Bulgarian defeat at Çatalca could be explained by the fact that the Bulgarian army had allowed the Ottomans to retreat unmolested, thus giving them the opportunity to recover and entrench, as well as by the exhausting long marches, poor reconnaissance, the cholera epidemic and inadequate food supplies. The situation was further hampered by the lack of heavy artillery and the inadequate positioning of the available field artillery 4–6 km from the front. He argues that either there should not have been an attack in the first place, or all available forces should have been put to use, instead of making a half-hearted attempt by means of a frontal assault along the entire Ottoman line, rather than concentrating the attack on a sector where a breakthrough could be achieved.

The defeat at Çatalca eliminated the possibility of concluding a quick and advantageous peace for Bulgaria. The Bulgarian army lost the initiative in the fighting. The losses suffered (1,482 killed, 1,401 missing without a trace, 9,129 wounded) and the cholera epidemic that began at the same time, which claimed the lives of another 1,600 people, further weakened the Bulgarian units, which had already suffered significant casualties since the beginning of the war. Demoralization among the Bulgarian troops was accompanied by a hardening of Ottoman policy. Two weeks after the battle, an armistice was concluded, which lasted no more than two months. Fighting in the Çatalca area continued with interruptions until April 1913.

== Sources ==
- Erickson, Edward J. (2003). Defeat in Detail: The Ottoman Army in the Balkans, 1912–1913. Greenwood Publishing Group. ISBN 0-275-97888-5.
- Markov, Georgi (2012). Balgariya v Balkanskiya sayuz sreshtu Osmanskata imperiya, 1911–1913 [Bulgaria in the Balkan League against the Ottoman Empire, 1911–1913] (in Bulgarian). Sofia: Zahariy Stoyanov. ISBN 978-954-09-0725-3.
- Hall, Richard C. (2000). The Balkan Wars, 1912–1913: Prelude to the First World War. Routledge. ISBN 0-415-22946-4.
- Vŭchkov, Aleksandŭr. (2005). The Balkan War 1912-1913. Angela. ISBN 954-90587-4-3.
- Balkanskata voyna 1912–1913 [The Balkan War 1912–1913] (in Bulgarian). Sofia: Darzhavno voenno izdatelstvo. 1961.
