= 5th Army (Austria-Hungary) =

Austro-Hungarian field army

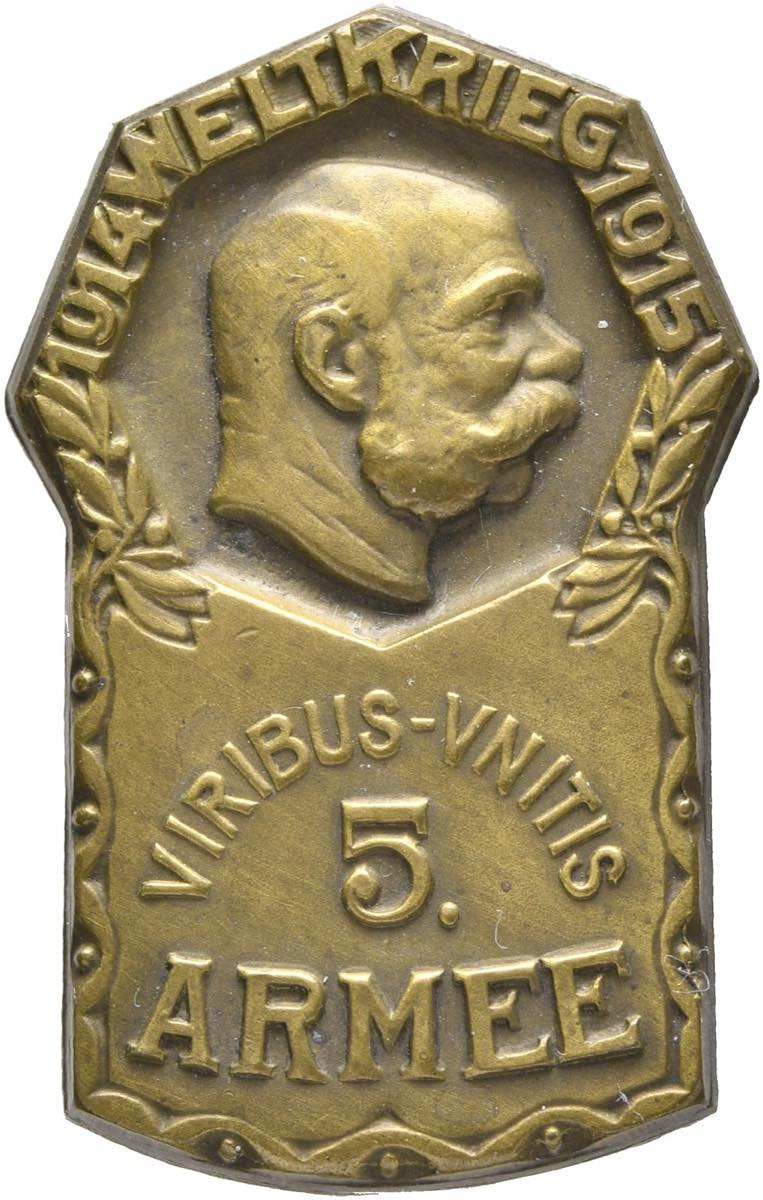
- Cap Badge
- Active: 1914 – 27 December 1914; May 1915 – 3 November 1918
- Country: Austria-Hungary
- Allegiance: (Austria-Hungary) Habsburg monarchy
- Branch: Austro-Hungarian Army
- Garrison/HQ: Brčko, Austria-Hungary
- Engagements: World War I: Serbian campaign (1914); Battle of Cer; Battle of Drina; Battle of Kolubara; Italian front; Battles of the Isonzo; Battle of Caporetto; Battle of the Piave River; Battle of Vittorio Veneto

The Austro-Hungarian Fifth Army was an Austro-Hungarian field army that fought during World War I.

== Actions ==
=== First Serbian Campaign ===
The Fifth Army was formed in 1914 as part of Austro-Hungarian mobilisation following its declaration of war on Serbia and Russia. The Fifth Army was under the command of Gen. Liborius Ritter von Frank. Its headquarter was in the Bosnian town of Brčko. Together with Sixth Army it was a formation of Minimalgruppe Balkan and was assigned to the Balkan Front as part of Balkanstreitkräfte (Balkan Armed Forces) under the command of Lieutenant General Oskar Potiorek.

The Fifth Army comprised the VIII Corps from Prague, under with two infantry divisions (9th K.u.k. and 21st Landwehr), and the XIII Corps from Zagreb (Agram) in Croatia with two infantry divisions (36th K.u.k. and 42nd Honved Divisions). The Fifth Army represented approximately 93,000 rifles and included a large proportion of South Slavs from the Empire.

Between August and December 1914, it fought in the First Serbian Campaign and suffered such enormous casualties fighting the Serbian Army that it was disbanded on 27 December 1914 and the commander of the Balkanstreitkräfte was forced to resign.

=== Italian Front ===
The Fifth Army was reestablished in May 1915 on the Italian Front, where it remained active until the end of the War.
On 24 May 1917, it was renamed the Isonzo Army.
On 23 August 1917, the Isonzo Army was upgraded to Army Group Boroević (Heeresgruppe "Boroević") which was composed of 2 armies:

- First Isonzo Army, under command of Wenzel von Wurm.
- Second Isonzo Army, under command of Johann Ritter von Henriquez.

In January 1918 the Army Group was composed of

- Isonzo Army, under command of Wenzel von Wurm.
- Sixth Army, under command of Archduke Joseph August of Austria.

== Commanders ==
- Liborius Ritter von Frank: 14 August – 27 December 1914
- Svetozar Boroević: 27 May 1915 – 3 November 1918

== Sources ==
- Austro-Hungarian Army, Higher Commands and Commanders
- Lyon, J. (2015). Serbia and the Balkan Front, 1914: The Outbreak of the Great War. History (Bloomsbury). Bloomsbury Academic. ISBN 978-1-4725-8004-7.
