= Serbian campaign (1914) =

1914 military campaign in Serbia

- Part of the Serbian campaign of World War I
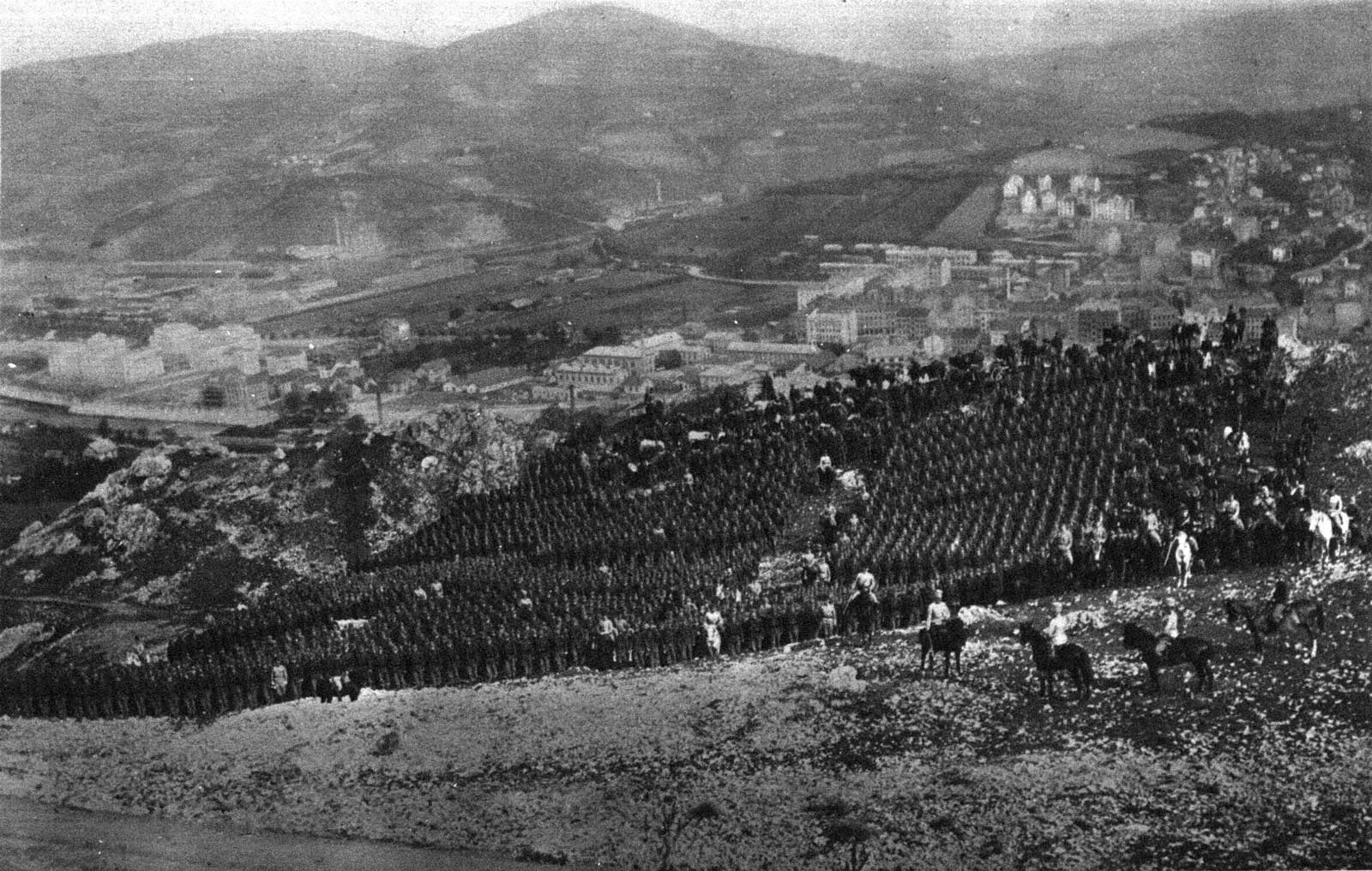
- Mobilised Austro-Hungarian troops in Sarajevo departing for the Serbian front, 1914
Date	28 July – 15 December 1914 (4 months, 2 weeks and 3 days)
Location	Serbia, Montenegro, Albania
Result	Serbian victory

Belligerents
Serbia; Montenegro	Austria-Hungary

Commanders and leaders
Radomir Putnik; Živojin Mišić; Petar Bojović; Stepa Stepanović; Pavle Jurišić Šturm; Janko Vukotić	Oskar Potiorek; Eduard von Böhm-Ermolli; Liborius von Frank

Units involved
1st Army; 2nd Army; 3rd Army; Užice Army	2nd Army; 5th Army; 6th Army

Strength
Serbia: 420,597; Montenegro: ~50,000	462,000 (Note: Total number of Austro-Hungarian troops deployed to the Balkans by mid-December 1914.)

Casualties and losses
Total: 163,557: 22,276 killed; 96,122 wounded; 45,159 missing	Total: 273,804: 28,276 killed; 122,122 wounded; 76,690 missing or captured; 46,716 sick

The Serbian campaign of 1914 was a significant military operation during World War I. It marked the first major confrontation between the Central Powers, primarily Austria-Hungary, and the Allied Powers, led by the Kingdom of Serbia. The campaign started on 28 July 1914, when Austria-Hungary declared war on Serbia and bombarded Belgrade. On 12 August, the Austro-Hungarian forces, led by General Oskar Potiorek, launched their first offensive into Serbia.

The Austro-Hungarian forces, known as Balkanstreitkräfte and consisting of the 5th and 6th Armies, attacked Serbia from the west and north. The Serbian army under the command of General Radomir Putnik using their knowledge of the rugged terrain and the strategic advantage of the rivers, defeated the 5th Army at the Battle of Cer, repelling all the Austro-Hungarian forces out of Serbia, marking the first Allied victory of the First World War.

After the failure of the first invasion, Austria-Hungary regrouped and launched a second invasion in September 1914, at the Battle of the Drina the Serbs pushed the 5th Army back into Bosnia while forcing on 25 September the remains of the Balkanstreitkräfte to retreat to avoid encirclement. On 24 October, the Valjevo Offensive saw Potiorek launching a third invasion, this time reaching deep into northern Serbia, capturing Belgrade, the Serbian capital, on 2 December 1914. Following a successful counter-offensive at the Battle of Kolubara, the Serbian army managed to expel the Central Powers forces again from its territory before the end of December, consequently ending the campaign.

Potiorek was relieved of his command after the three invasions had achieved none of their objectives. The campaign cost the Habsburg forces 28,000 dead and 122,000 wounded. Serbian losses were also heavy with 22,000 dead, 91,000 wounded, and 19,000 captured or missing. Less than a year later, after combining the armies of Germany, Austria-Hungary and Bulgaria, the Central Powers returned for a massive offensive during the Serbian campaign of 1915.

== Background ==
On 28 June 1914, Archduke Franz Ferdinand, heir presumptive to the Austro-Hungarian throne, and his wife Sophie were assassinated while visiting Sarajevo, the provincial capital of Bosnia-Herzegovina, formally annexed by Austria-Hungary. The perpetuator, Bosnian Serb student Gavrilo Princip, was a southern Slav nationalist, member of Young Bosnia, a secret society aiming to free Bosnia from Austrian rule and achieve the unification of the South Slavs. The group was helped by the Black Hand, a Serbian secret nationalist group.

The Austro-Hungarian government who saw Serbia's nationalist aspirations as a threat to its own multi-ethnic empire, used the assassination as the perfect pretext to take action against Serbia, ostensibly as a punitive measure but in reality with the aim of reestablishing its authority in the Balkans.

On 23 July 1914, Austria-Hungary issued an ultimatum to Serbia, presenting a list of stringent demands. On 25 July Franz Conrad von Hötzendorf, the Chief of the General Staff, gave the mobilisation order for the Austro-Hungarian units required for Case B, the war plan formulated against Serbia and Montenegro. The Serbian response to the ultimatum, which came on 25 July, was conciliatory in some aspects but did not fully comply with all of Austria-Hungary's demands. Serbia accepted most of the conditions but expressed reservations about certain points that it believed impinged on its sovereignty and independence. Austria-Hungary rejected Serbia's response, considering it insufficient. As the diplomatic efforts faltered, Austria-Hungary declared war on Serbia on 28 July 1914, formally initiating the war with the bombardment of Belgrade. The Habsburg invasion plan had the objective of achieving a total defeat of Serbia. Russia, Serbia's ally, began mobilising its forces in response to Austria-Hungary's aggression, leading to Germany declaring war on Russia.

== Opposing forces ==
General Oskar Potiorek, the Balkanstreitkräfte commander leading the invasion of Serbia, began with a force of 460,000 soldiers spread across 19 divisions. In opposition, Field Marshal Radomir Putnik commanded 400,000 Serbian troops, among whom were 185,000 seasoned veterans who had participated in the Balkan Wars of 1912–1913. Serbia's ally, Montenegro, contributed an extra 40,000 men.

== Operations ==
=== Bombardment of Belgrade ===
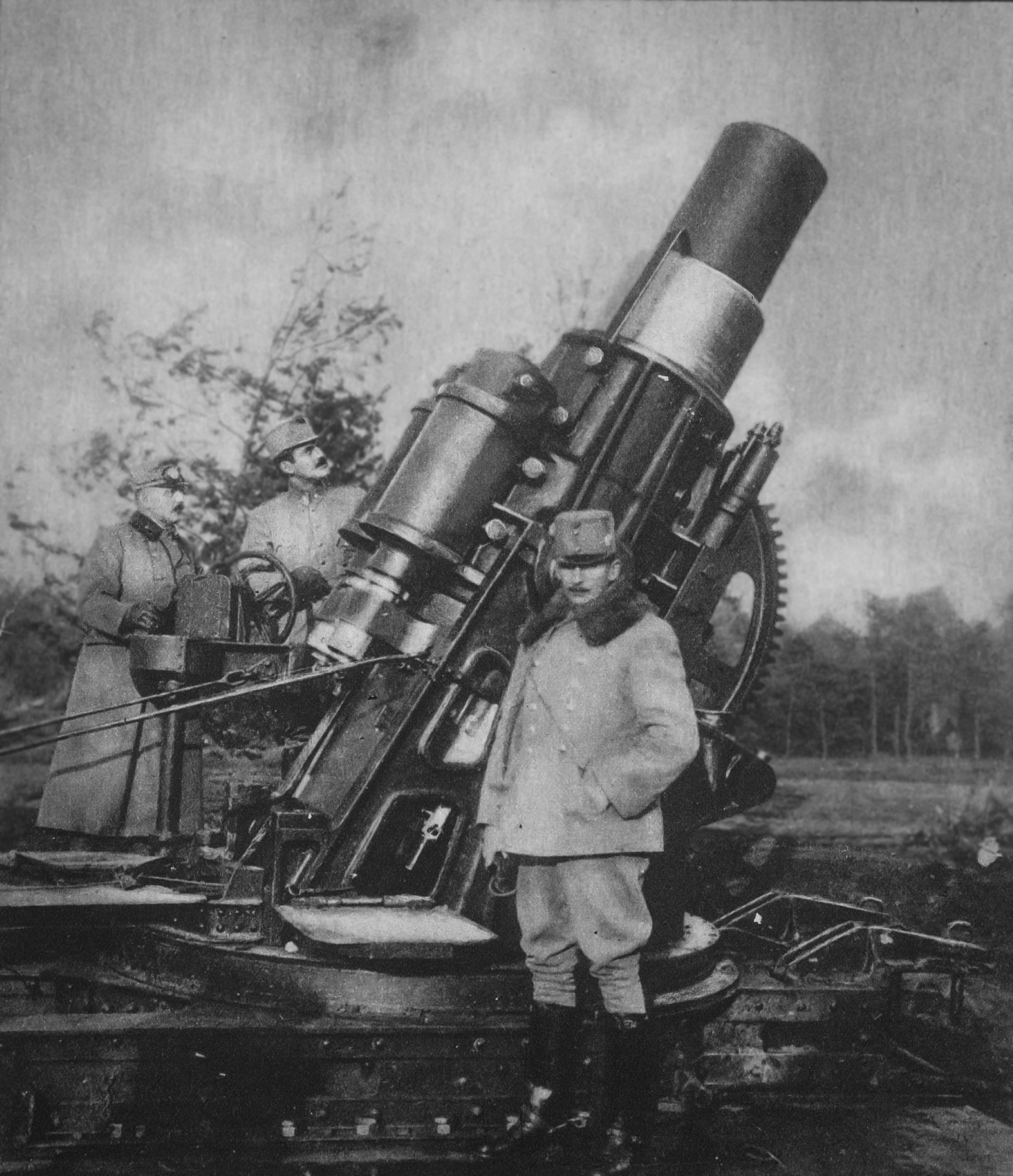
A Škoda 305 mm mortar used by the Austro-Hungarian army to fire on Belgrade

During the night of 28–29 July 1914, three Austro-Hungarian river monitors of the Austrian Danube Flotilla attempted to secure the bridges over the River Sava between Semlin (Zemun) and Belgrade. After facing fierce resistance from Serbian irregulars, the landing was aborted, and the monitors were redirected to the railway bridge connecting Serbia to the Habsburg Empire. Before the barge could reach it a detachment of Serbian Chetniks blew up the bridge.

Around 2 am, two river monitors joined SMS Temes near Belgrade, starting firing 12-cm fused shells and shrapnel fire onto the Serbian side. The Serbs lacked heavy artillery to respond effectively. The monitors then moved closer to the Belgrade Fortress and fired upon the radio station and the neighbourhood of Topčidersko Brdo. At 5 am, Habsburg artillery in Bežanija and Semlin also began shelling the city and Kalemegdan using Krupp Howitzer and Skoda 305 mm mortars. The shelling continued, causing damage to various buildings. The constant shelling on Serbia's border towns and cities continued with varying degrees of intensity over the next 36 days. By October 1914, 60 government buildings and 640 civilian houses were hit by the Austrian bombardment.

=== Mount Cer ===
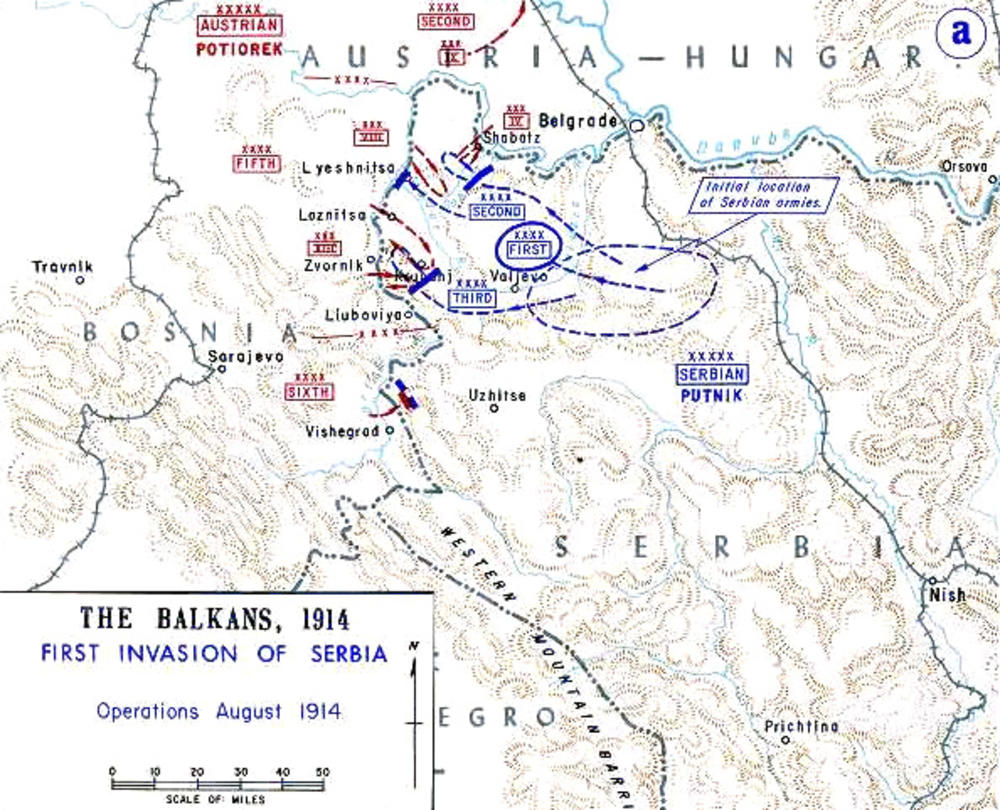
First Attack on Serbia, August 1914

Despite the incomplete concentration of the 5th and 6th Armies, the Austro-Hungarian forces launched their first offensive into Serbia on 12 August. The 2nd Army was due to be transported to Galicia to face the Russians on 18 August, which was also Emperor Franz Josef’s 84th birthday. Therefore the high command was determined to knock Serbia out as soon as possible.

5th Army started crossing the Drina River from northern Bosnia and was the first to engage in action, supported by elements of 2nd Army from Syrmia. On 15 August, 6th Army, positioned in southern Bosnia, attacked across the Serbian and Montenegrin border with its 16th Corps. This move surprised Marshal Putnik, who expected an attack from the north and initially believed it to be a feint. Once it became clear that it was the main thrust, Serbian 2nd Army under the command of General Stepa Stepanović was sent to reinforce the smaller Serbian 3rd Army under Pavle Jurišić Šturm, by a forced march during the night of 15–16 August. A fierce confrontation ensued on Mount Cer. A four-day battle ensued, culminating in the decisive defeat of Austro-Hungarian 5th Army on 20 August. The Austro-Hungarians were forced to retreat.

On 24 August, the liberation of Šabac, the largest town in Mačva, marked the ultimate failure of the first Austro-Hungarian invasion of Serbia. This success marked the first Allied victory of the war over the Central Powers. Casualties numbered 600 officers and 23,000 men for the Austro-Hungarians (4,500 of whom were captured) and 259 officers and 16,045 men for the Serbian Army.

=== Drina ===
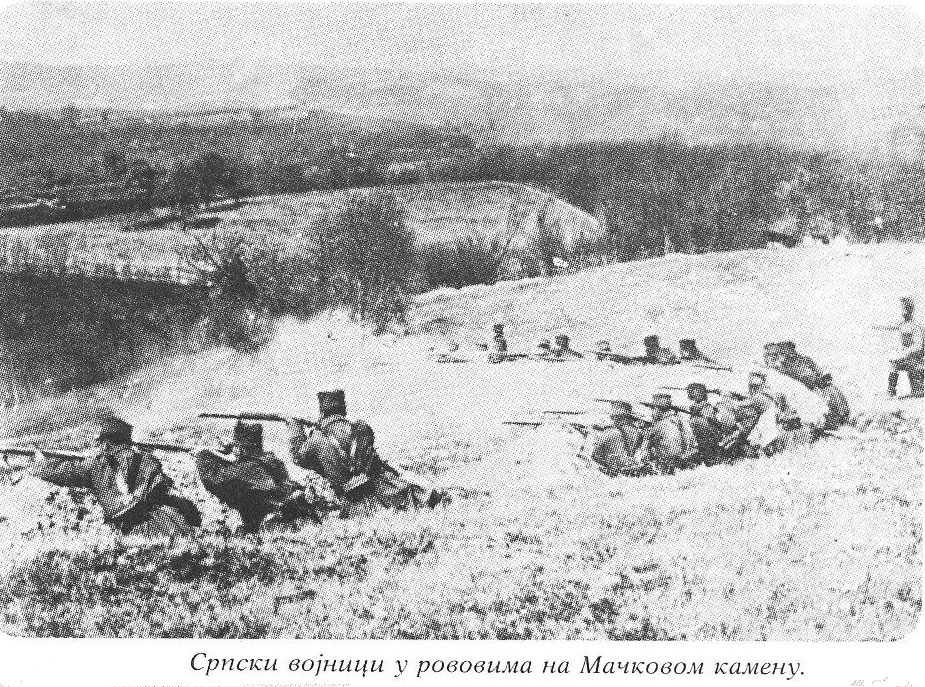
Serbian infantry during the Battle of the Drina

Under pressure from its allies, Serbia conducted a limited offensive across the Sava River into the Austro-Hungarian region of Syrmia with its Serbian First Army. The main operational goal was to delay the transport of the Austro-Hungarian Second Army to the Russian front. The objective was shown to be futile as forces of the Second Army were already being transported. Meanwhile, the Timok Division I of the Serbian Second Army suffered a heavy defeat in a diversionary crossing, suffering around 6,000 casualties while inflicting only 2,000.

With most of his forces in Bosnia, Potiorek decided that the best way to stop the Serbian offensive was to launch another invasion into Serbia to force the Serbs to recall their troops to defend their much smaller homeland.

"The Serbians, seasoned, war-hardened men, inspired by the fiercest patriotism, the result of generations of torment and struggle, awaited undaunted whatever fate might bestow."

— Winston Churchill, The Great War.

A renewed Austro-Hungarian attack from the west, across the Drina river, began on 7 September, this time with both the Fifth Army in Mačva as well as the Sixth further south. Though the initial attack by the Fifth Army was repelled by the Serbian Second Army, with 4,000 Austro-Hungarian casualties, the stronger Sixth Army managed to surprise the Serbian Third Army and gain a foothold. After some units from the Serbian Second Army were sent to bolster the Third, the Austro-Hungarian Fifth Army established a bridgehead with a renewed attack. At that time, Marshal Putnik withdrew the First Army from Syrmia (against strong opposition), using it to deliver a fierce counterattack against the Sixth Army that initially went well but finally bogged down in a bloody four-day fight for a peak of the Jagodnja mountain called Mačkov Kamen, in which both sides suffered horrendous losses in successive frontal attacks and counterattacks. Two Serbian divisions lost around 11,000 men, while Austro-Hungarian losses were probably comparable.

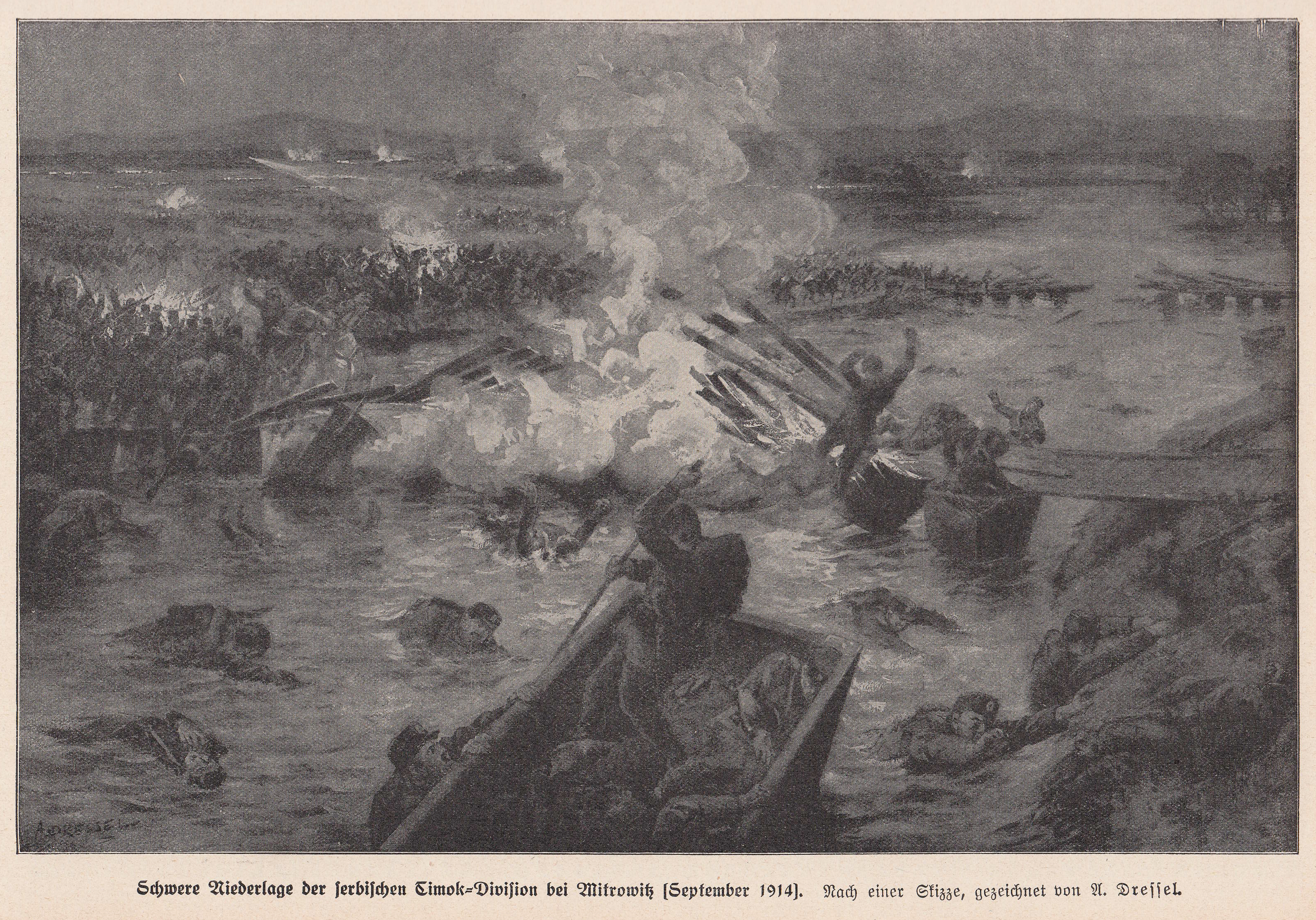
"The defeat of the Serbian Timok division" an illustration in Wort und Bild—A German / Austrian soldiers' propaganda magazine published during the war.

Marshal Putnik ordered a retreat into the surrounding hills, and the front settled into a month and a half of trench warfare. This was highly unfavourable to the Serbs, who had little in the way of an industrial base and were deficient in heavy artillery, ammunition stocks, shell production and footwear since the vast majority of infantry wore the traditional (though state-issued) opanaks when the Austro-Hungarians had waterproof leather boots. Most of their war material was supplied by the Allies, who were also short of such materials. In such a situation, Serbian artillery quickly became almost silent while the Austro-Hungarians steadily increased their fire. Serbian casualties reached 100 soldiers a day from all causes in some divisions.

During the first weeks of trench warfare, the Serbian Užice Army (the first strengthened division) and the Montenegrin Sanjak Army (roughly a division) conducted an abortive offensive into Bosnia. In addition, both sides conducted local attacks, most of which were defeated. In one such attack, the Serbian Army used mine warfare for the first time: the Combined Division dug tunnels beneath the Austro-Hungarian trenches (that were only 20–30 meters away from the Serbian ones on this sector), planted mines and set them off just before an infantry charge.

=== Kolubara ===
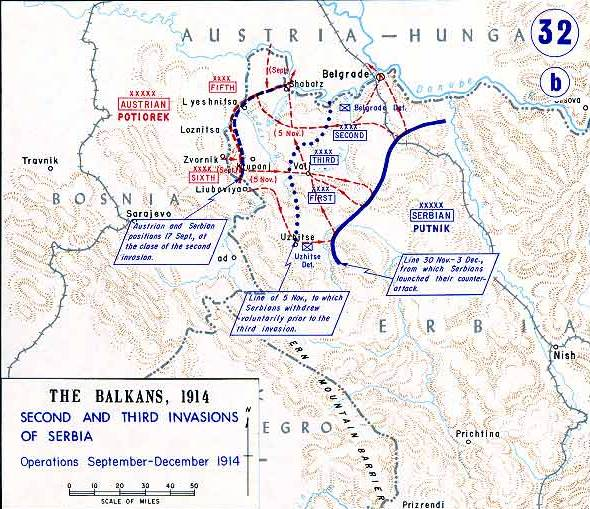
Second and Third invasion operations in Serbia, 1914

Having weakened the Serbian army, the Austro-Hungarian Army launched another massive attack on 5 November. The Serbs withdrew step by step, offering strong resistance at the Kolubara River, but to no avail, due to the lack of artillery ammunition. It was at that time that General Živojin Mišić was made commander of the battered First Army, replacing the wounded Petar Bojović. He insisted on a deep withdrawal to let the troops rest and to shorten the front. Marshal Putnik finally relented, but the consequence was the abandonment of the capital city of Belgrade. After suffering heavy losses, the Austro-Hungarian Army entered the city on 1 December. This action led Potiorek to move the whole Fifth Army into the Belgrade area and use it to crush the Serbian right flank. This, however, left the Sixth alone for a few days to face the whole Serbian army.

At this point, artillery ammunition finally arrived from France and Greece. In addition, some replacements were sent to the units, and Marshal Putnik correctly sensed that the Austro-Hungarian forces were dangerously overstretched and weakened in the previous offensives, so he ordered a full-scale counterattack with the entire Serbian Army on 3 December against the Sixth Army. The Fifth hurried its flanking manoeuvre, but it was already too late – with the Sixth Army broken, the Second and Third Serbian Armies overwhelmed the Fifth. Finally, Potiorek lost his nerve and ordered another retreat across the rivers into Austria-Hungary's territory. The Serbian Army recaptured Belgrade on 15 December.

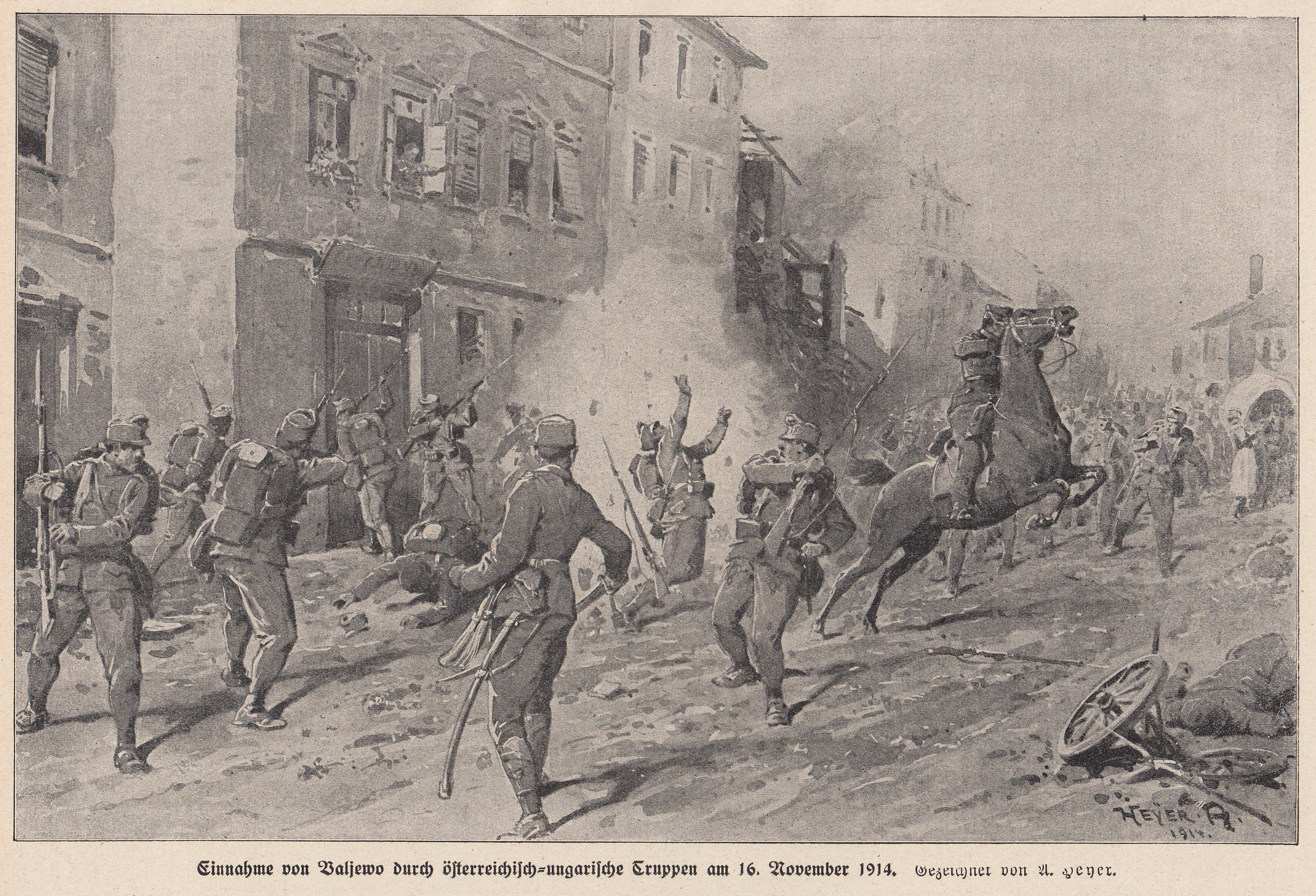
Austro-Hungarian troops entering the Serbian town of Valjevo during the first phase of the battle of Kolubara on 16 November 1914. An illustration in Wort und Bild.

After the Battle of Kolubara, the Serbian Parliament adopted the Niš Declaration (7 December 1914) on the war goals of Serbia: "Convinced that the entire Serbian nation is determined to persevere in the holy struggle for the defense of their homesteads and their freedom, the government of the Kingdom (of Serbia) considers that, in these fateful times, its main and only task is to ensure the successful completion of this great warfare which, at the moment when it started, also became a struggle for the liberation and unification of all our unliberated Serbian, Croatian and Slovenian brothers. The great success which is to crown this warfare will make up for the extremely bloody sacrifices which this generation of Serbs is making".

=== War crimes ===
During the first invasion of Serbia and its brief occupation of the country, Austria-Hungary sought not only to eliminate Serbia as a threat, but also to punish the whole nation for the assassination of Archduke Franz Ferdinand. The invasion and military occupation accordingly turned into a war of annihilation, accompanied by massacres of civilians and the taking and summary execution of hostages. During this short occupation, between 3,500 and 4,000 Serb civilians were killed in executions and acts of random violence by marauding troops.

== Aftermath ==
The first phase of the war against Serbia had ended with no change in the border, but casualties were enormous compared to earlier wars, albeit comparable to other campaigns of World War I. The Serbian army suffered more than 22,000 dead while more than 28,000 men were killed on the Austro-Hungarians side. Austro-Hungarian General Potiorek was removed from command and replaced by Archduke Eugen of Austria. On the Serbian side, a deadly typhus epidemic killed hundreds of thousands of Serb civilians during the winter. In Autumn 1915, German, Austro-Hungarian and Bulgarian forces would launch a successful offensive against Serbia.
