= Wenzel von Wurm =

Colonel General of Austro-Hungarian Army

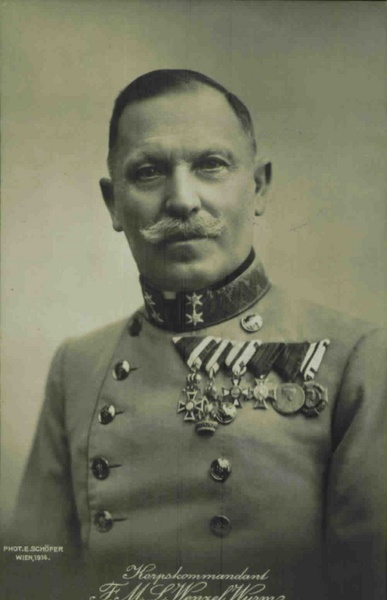
- As commander of the 1st Isonzo Army
- Born: February 27, 1859; Prague, Bohemia, Austrian Empire
- Died: March 21, 1921 (aged 62); Vienna, First Austrian Republic
- Military career
- Allegiance: Austria-Hungary
- Branch: Austro-Hungarian Army
- Service years: 1875-1918
- Rank: Colonel general
- Conflicts: World War I: Serbian campaign; Battle of Caporetto; Battle of the Piave River; Battle of Vittorio Veneto
- Awards: Military Order of Maria Theresa

Wenzel Freiherr von Wurm (Karlín (Prague), 27 February 1859 – Vienna, 21 March 1921) was a Colonel General in the Austro-Hungarian Army.

== Biography ==
He was born on 27 February 1859 as son of an Oberleutnant in the Austro-Hungarian Army. He entered the army in 1875 and by 1914 had become Feldmarschalleutnant and commander of the XVI Army Corps in Ragusa (today Dubrovnik).

Promoted to Feldzeugmeister, he participated with his XVI Korps, as part of the 6th Army in the disastrous 1914 attack of Serbia. Commanding General Oskar Potiorek took all the blame for the failure, but Von Wurm had gained a reputation as a ruthless commander without consideration for his troops.

As Italy declared war on Austria-Hungary on 23 May 1915, von Wurm and his XVI Corps were sent to stop the Italian advance. Against orders, he positioned his Corps along the Isonzo river. Their presence there turned out to be crucial in stopping four consecutive Italian attacks. In August 1917, he received the Knights' cross of Military Order of Maria Theresa, and was ennobled to "Freiherr von".

Promoted to Generaloberst, he received command of the 1st Isonzo Army and participated in the successful Battle of Caporetto. As commander of the 5th Army (or Isonzo Army) since 6 January 1918, he fought in the Battle of the Piave River and the final Battle of Vittorio Veneto.

He was retired on 1 December 1918 and died 3 years later in Vienna on 21 March 1921.
