= Alois Schönburg-Hartenstein =

Austrian politician and military officer (1858–1944)

Prince Alois Schönburg-Hartenstein
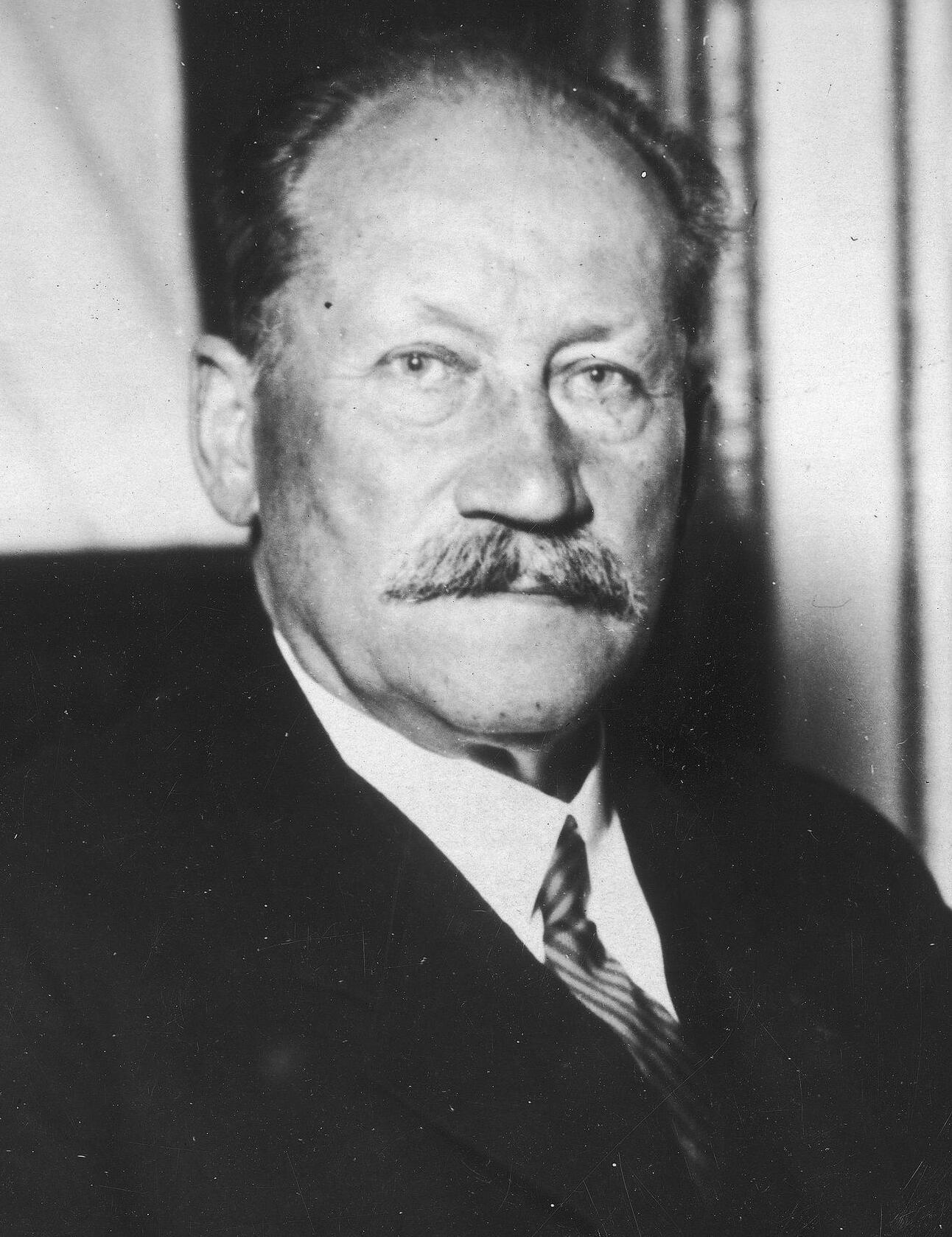
- Alois Schönburg-Hartenstein c. 1933–1934

Minister of Defense of Austria
- In office 12 March 1934 – 10 July 1934
- Chancellor: Engelbert Dollfuss
- Preceded by: Engelbert Dollfuss
- Succeeded by: Engelbert Dollfuss

Personal details
- Born: 21 November 1858 Karlsruhe, Grand Duchy of Baden
- Died: 21 September 1944 (aged 85) Hartenstein, Nazi Germany

Military service
- Allegiance: Austria-Hungary
- Rank: Generaloberst (1918)
- Unit: Austro-Hungarian Army
- Commands: 6th Army
- Battles/wars: World War I; Battle of Limanowa; Fifth Battle of the Isonzo; Battle of Asiago; Eleventh Battle of the Isonzo; Second Battle of the Piave River

Prince Alois Schönburg-Hartenstein (German: Alois Fürst von Schönburg-Hartenstein) (21 November 1858 – 21 September 1944) was a military officer in the Austro-Hungarian army and as a Prince of Schönburg-Hartenstein, a member of the high Austrian nobility. He briefly served from March to July 1934 as Minister of Defense of the First Austrian Republic.

== Biography ==
Born into one of the most prominent German noble families, Aloys was the son of Alexander, 3rd Prince of Schönburg-Hartenstein, adiplomat, and his wife, Princess Caroline of Liechtenstein. From 1899 to 1913, Schönburg-Hartenstein was president of the Austrian Red Cross. Following the outbreak of the First World War, he commanded several units, including the 6th Division and the XX (Edelweiss) Corps.

According to Baron Ferdinand Marterer, Schönburg-Hartenstein was suggested as a candidate for imperial minister of defense by the chief of the general staff Arz von Straussenberg in April 1917. In early 1918, as domestic unrest over the war and continuing shortages of food increased within Austria-Hungary, he was appointed to command troops to maintain security within the empire by Emperor Karl I. In this capacity, he arrested strike leaders and 44,000 military deserters. In the summer of 1918, he again took combat command, leading the 6th Army in Northern Italy during the Battle of the Piave River, in which he was wounded in the leg. As the Austro-Hungarian political and military situation became ever more precarious in the autumn of 1918, Prince Alois expressed a realization of the coming end of the war and the monarchy, writing his family that "[my] remaining duty is to preserve discipline and protect the new Austria."

Following the fall of the Habsburg monarchy and the establishment of republican Austria, he was the state secretary of the army from September 1933 to March 1934, when he was appointed to the post of defense minister in the cabinet of Engelbert Dollfuss, a position he held until July 1934. While in government, he appealed to Austrian nationalists and veterans to support the Dollfuss administration and oppose pro-German National Socialism.
