= Miloš Božanović =

Serbian general

General Miloš Božanović
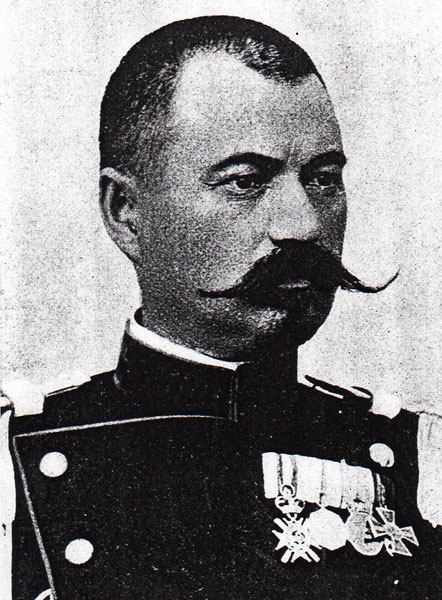
- Born: 10 March 1863; Rajevo Selo, Austrian Empire
- Died: 14 January 1922 (aged 58); Belgrade, Kingdom of Serbs, Croats and Slovenes
- Military career
- Allegiance: Kingdom of Serbia
- Branch: Royal Serbian Army
- Service years: 1885–1917
- Rank: General
- Unit: Užice Army
- Conflicts: Serbo-Bulgarian War: Siege of Vidin; Balkan Wars: Battle of Kumanovo; Battle of Monastir; Battle of Bregalnica; World War I: Battle of Cer; Battle of Kolubara; Serbo-Montenegrin Offensive in Bosnia

Miloš Božanović (Serbian Cyrillic: Милош Божановић; 10 March 1863 – 14 January 1922) was a Serbian military commander and Minister of Defence.

He served during the Serbo-Bulgarian War, the Balkan Wars and during the Serbian Campaign (part of the larger Balkans Campaign) during World War I.

== Career ==
Božanović was the Minister of Defence of the Kingdom of Serbia from 3 January 1913 to 4 January 1914. At his own request, he retired from all duties on 1 November 1917.

== Death ==
While hunting, he contracted a cold which ended up in pneumonia from which he died on 14 January 1922 in Belgrade, just one day after the death of Serbian general Pavle Jurišić Šturm.

Government offices
Preceded by Radivoje Bojović	Minister of Defence; 1913–1914	Succeeded by Dušan Stefanović
