= Liborius Ritter von Frank =

Austrian general (1848–1935)

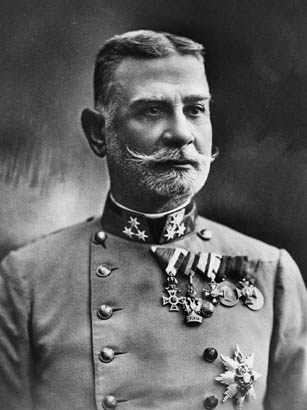
- Born: 5 October 1848
- Died: 26 February 1935 (aged 86)
- Military career
- Allegiance: Austria-Hungary
- Branch: Austro-Hungarian Army
- Rank: General
- Commands: 5th Army
- Conflicts: World War I: Serbian campaign (1914); Battle of Cer; Battle of the Drina; Battle of Kolubara

Liborius Ritter von Frank (5 October 1848 – 26 February 1935) was an Austro-Hungarian general in World War I. He commanded the Austro-Hungarian Fifth Army in 1914 at the start of the war, and fought at the Battle of Cer, Battle of the Drina and Battle of Kolubara. He was replaced by General Karl Tersztyánszky von Nádas after the failure of the first Serbian campaign, the enormous casualties suffered by his army reduced to about 40% of its strength and the disbandment of the Balkanstreitkräfte.
