= Battle of the Drina =

1914 battle near Loznica, Serbia

- Part of the Serbian campaign of the Balkans theatre of World War I
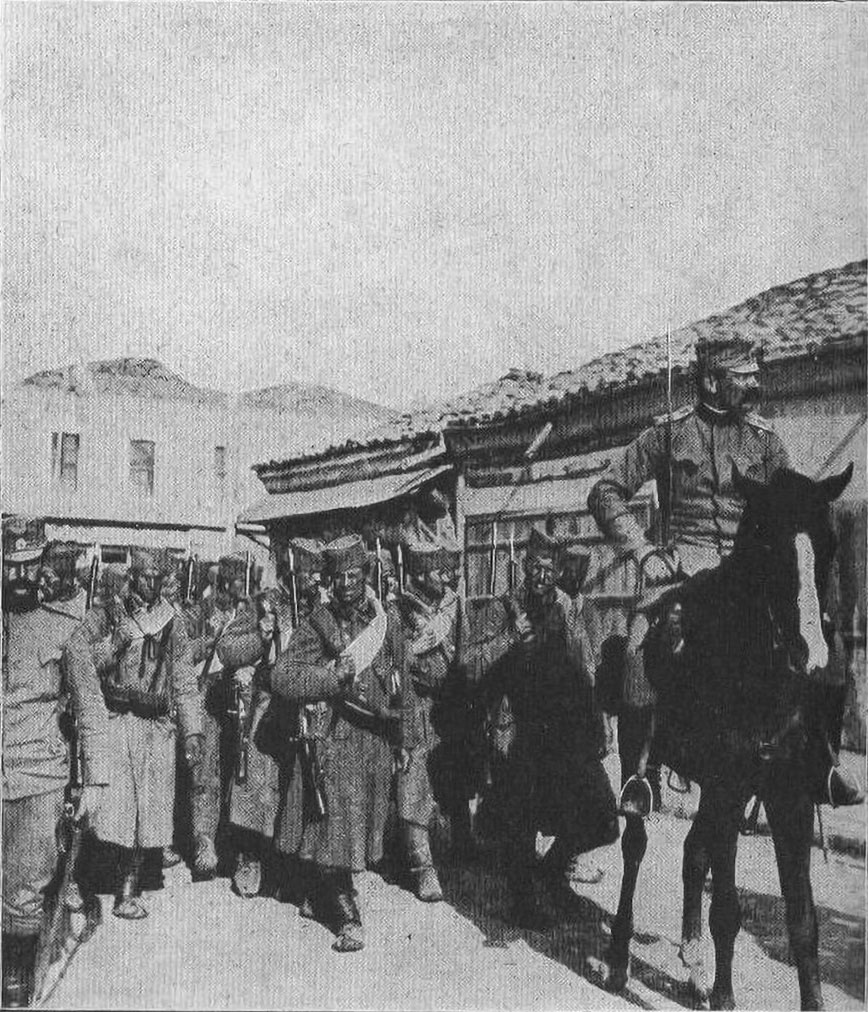
- Serbian infantry heading to the front
Date	7–24 September 1914
Location	Drina River, western Kingdom of Serbia 44°19′47″N 19°17′33″E
Result	Inconclusive (See Aftermath)

Belligerents
Austria-Hungary	Kingdom of Serbia; Montenegro

Commanders and leaders
Oskar Potiorek; Liborius Ritter von Frank	Stepa Stepanović; Pavle Jurišić Šturm

Units involved
5th Army; 6th Army	2nd Army; 3rd Army

Casualties and losses
Total: 40,000	Total: 30,000
- Location within Serbia

The Battle of the Drina (Serbian: Bitka na Drini, Битка на Дрини) was fought between Serbian and Austro-Hungarian armies in September 1914, near Loznica, Serbia, during the First Serbian campaign of World War I.

After a first failed invasion of Serbia where he lost 40,000 men, Oskar Potiorek, the Austro-Hungarian commander of the Balkanstreitkräfte, launched a new offensive across the River Drina at the western Serbian border; after successfully crossing the river the night of 7—8 September the Austro-Hungarian forces were stopped facing strong Serbian defensive positions. In the meantime, the Serbian army was forced to end their offensive into Austrian Syrmia and regroup their forces to face the threat. Meanwhile, in the far west, a smaller force of Serbian and Montenegrin troops moved into Bosnia, taking Višegrad. In the South, the Austrians took Shabatz (Šabac). On 17 September, a counterattack pushed the Austrians back to the Drina, where both sides settled into trench warfare.

The Battle of the Drina is considered one of the bloodiest on the war's Balkan Front.

== Prelude ==
After being defeated in the Battle of Cer in August 1914, the Austro-Hungarian army withdrew across the Drina River into Bosnia and Syrmia. Under pressure from the Allies, Serbia launched the Srem Offensive, crossing the Sava River into the Austro-Hungarian region of Syrmia, capturing Zemun and advancing up to 20 miles into enemy territory. During a diversionary crossing, the Timok First Division of the Serbian Second Army suffered significant losses when a bridge collapsed, causing confusion and panic. The division incurred approximately 6,000 casualties while inflicting only 2,000 on the enemy.

With most of his forces concentrated in Bosnia, General Oskar Potiorek concluded that the most effective way to halt the Serbian offensive was to initiate a second invasion of Serbia, thereby compelling the Serbs to redeploy their troops to defend their territory.

== Offensive ==
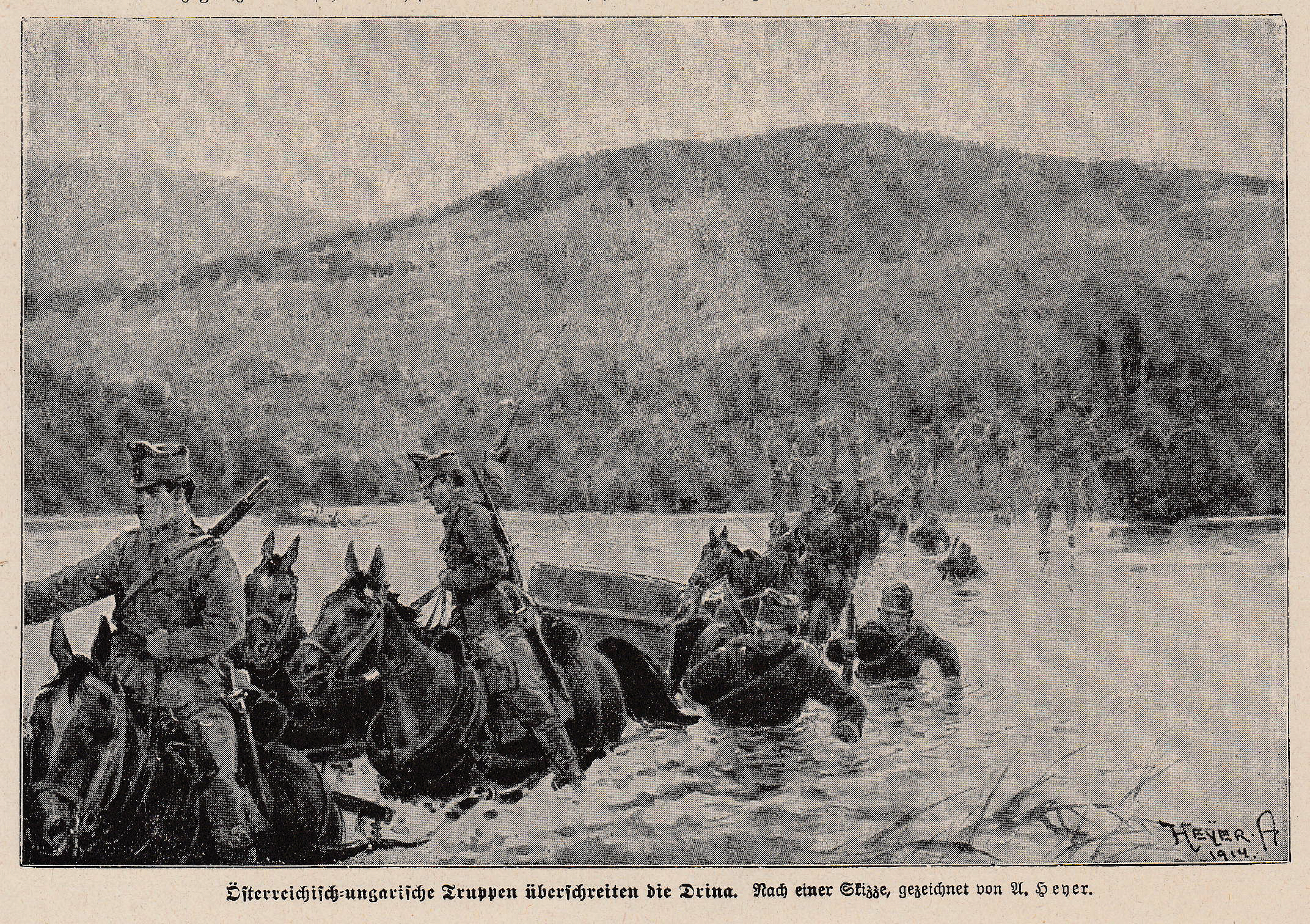
Austro-Hungarian troops crossing the Drina River. Based on a sketch by A. Scheyer

On 7 September, Austro-Hungarian forces launched a renewed offensive from the west, crossing the Drina River with both the Fifth Army operating in the Mačva region and the Sixth Army positioned further south. The initial advance by the Fifth Army was repelled by the Serbian Second Army, resulting in 4,000 Austro-Hungarian casualties and forcing a withdrawal back into Bosnia. In contrast, the stronger Sixth Army succeeded in surprising the Serbian Third Army and gained a foothold on Serbian territory. Reinforcements from the Serbian Second Army were dispatched to support the defence, but the Austro-Hungarian Fifth Army managed to establish a bridgehead during a renewed assault.

Field Marshal Radomir Putnik withdrew the First Army from Syrmia, conducting a forced march south to reinforce Serbian positions. The counteroffensive targeted the Sixth Army and initially made progress, but culminated in a prolonged and bloody four-day engagement at Mačkov Kamen, a peak of the Jagodnja mountain. The fighting consisted of repeated frontal assaults and counterattacks, resulting in severe casualties on both sides. Two Serbian divisions suffered losses estimated at 11,000 men, while Austro-Hungarian losses were likely of a similar scale. On 25 September, the Austro-Hungarian Sixth Army withdrew to avoid being outflanked.

Following the withdrawal, Putnik ordered Serbian forces to occupy defensive positions in the surrounding hills. The front subsequently stabilised, and a period of trench warfare lasting over a month ensued. This stalemate was particularly unfavourable for the Serbian army, which was poorly equipped for prolonged static combat. Its heavy artillery was largely obsolete, ammunition stocks were low, and shell production was limited to a single factory outputting roughly 100 rounds per day. In addition, Serbian infantry were issued traditional opanaks, which provided inadequate protection compared to the Austro-Hungarian army's leather boots. Although Serbia received material support from the Allies, supply was inconsistent and insufficient. Consequently, Serbian artillery fire declined, while Austro-Hungarian firepower increased. Some Serbian divisions experienced daily casualties of up to 100 men from all causes.

During the early phase of trench warfare, the Serbian Užice Army, comprising one reinforced division, and the Montenegrin Sanjak Army, roughly equivalent to a division, launched a joint offensive into Bosnia. On 14 September, they captured the town of Višegrad. Aside from this action, both sides conducted limited local operations, none of which achieved meaningful success.

== Aftermath ==
Although the Serbs repelled the second Austro-Hungarian invasion, the Austro-Hungarian forces retained a foothold in Serbian territory, from which they would launch a third offensive.

== Casualties ==
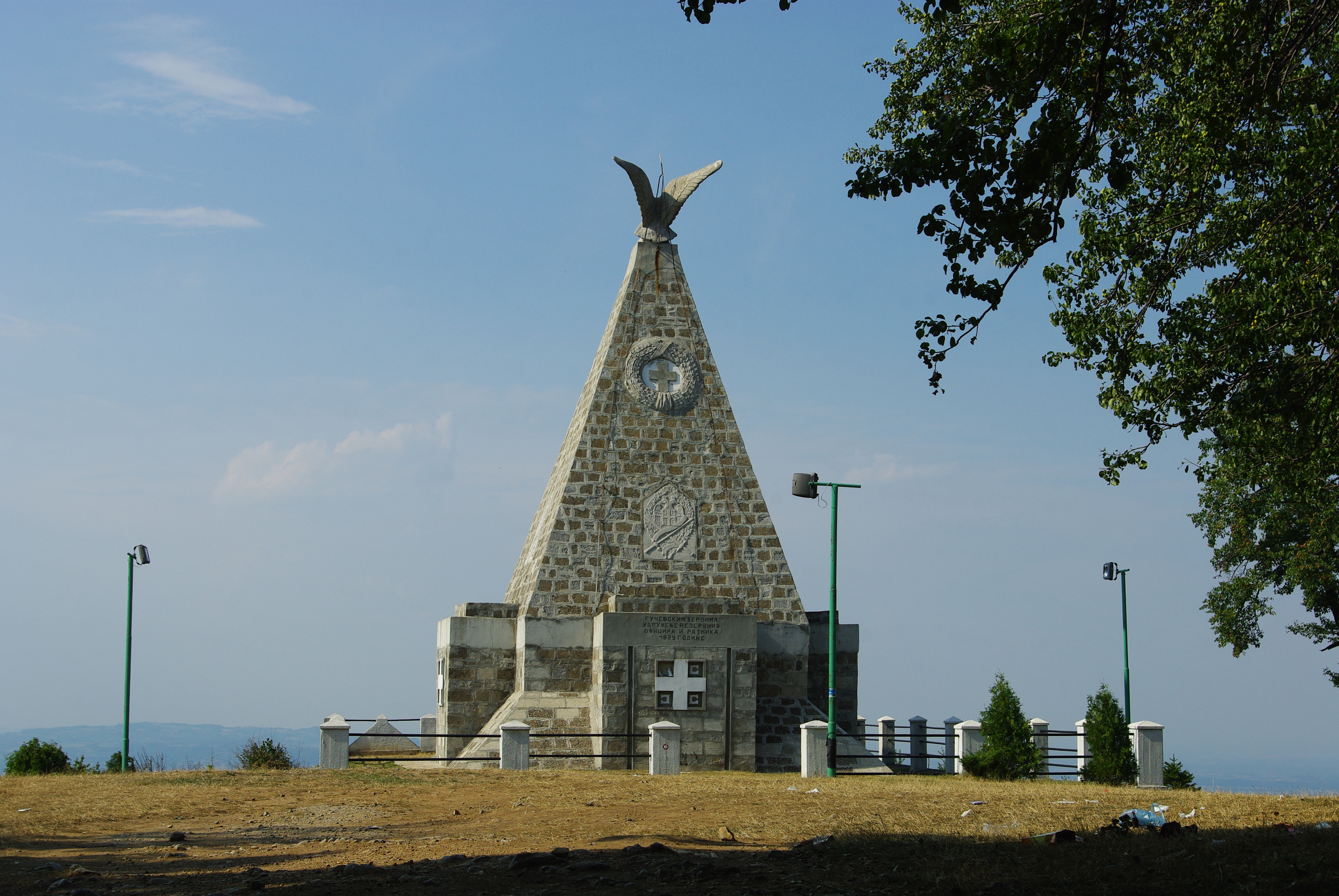
Monument to the fallen Serbian and Austro-Hungarian troops on the site of the battle

Military historian Mark Clodfelter reports 40,000 casualties for the attacking Austro-Hungarian army and 30,000 for the defending Serbian army. Two Austrian corps sustained almost 30,000 casualties, and one Serbian division suffered 6,000.

== See also ==
- Battle of Cer
- Battle of Kolubara

== Sources ==
- Clodfelter, M. (2017). Warfare and Armed Conflicts: A Statistical Encyclopedia of Casualty and Other Figures, 1492–2015, 4th ed. McFarland, Incorporated, Publishers. ISBN 978-1-4766-2585-0.
- Hogg, I.V. (1995). Battles: A Concise Dictionary. A Harvest original. Harcourt Brace. ISBN 978-0-15-600397-1.
- Pope, S.; Wheal, E.A. (2007). Dictionary of the First World War. Pen & Sword military classics. Pen & Sword Military Classics. ISBN 978-0-85052-979-1.
- Mitar Đurišić, Prvi svetski rat - u bici na Drini (PDF), archived from the original (PDF) on 2011-07-26
- http://www.rastko.org.yu/svecovek/ustrojstvo/namesnistva/radjevina/krupanj/spomen_crkva_l.html
- Tucker, S.; Roberts, P.M.; ABC-Clio (2005). World War I: Encyclopedia. ABC-CLIO. ISBN 978-1-85109-420-2.
- Tucker, S.; Roberts, P.M. (2006). World War I: A Student Encyclopedia. World War I: Student Encyclopedia. ABC-CLIO. ISBN 978-1-85109-879-8.
