= Battle of Kolubara =

1914 battle during World War I

- Part of the Serbian campaign of the Balkans theatre of World War I
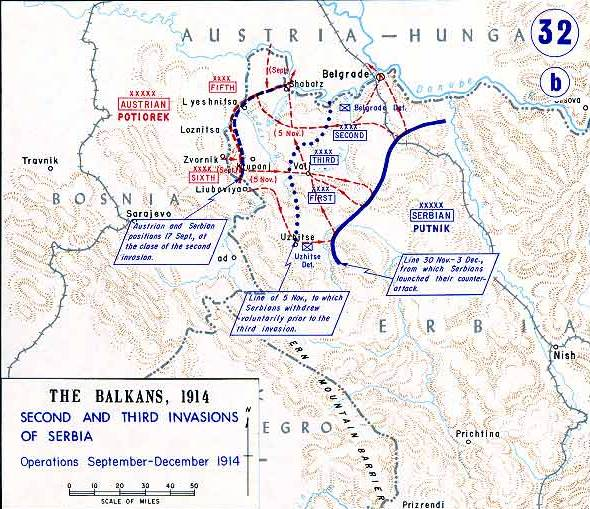
- Map depicting the third Austro-Hungarian invasion of Serbia, November–December 1914
Date	16 November – 15 December 1914
Location	Kolubara River, Kingdom of Serbia 44°22′56″N 20°15′46″E
Result	Serbian victory: Liberation of Belgrade; Withdrawal of Austrian troops from Serbia

Belligerents
Kingdom of Serbia	Austria-Hungary

Commanders and leaders
Radomir Putnik; Živojin Mišić; Stepa Stepanović; Pavle Jurišić Šturm; Miloš Božanović	Oskar Potiorek; Liborius Ritter von Frank

Units involved
1st Army; 2nd Army; 3rd Army; Užice Army	5th Army; 6th Army

Strength
400,000	450,000

Casualties and losses
Total: 132,000: 22,000 killed; 91,000 wounded; 19,000 missing or captured	Total: 273,000: 30,000 killed; 173,000 wounded; 70,000 captured

The Battle of Kolubara (Serbian Cyrillic: Колубарска битка, German: Schlacht an der Kolubara) was fought between Austria-Hungary and Serbia in November and December 1914, during the Serbian Campaign of 1914.

It commenced on 16 November, when the Austro-Hungarians under the command of Oskar Potiorek reached the Kolubara river during their third invasion of Serbia that year, having captured the strategic town of Valjevo and forced the Serbian army to undertake a series of retreats. The Serbs withdrew from Belgrade on 29–30 November, and the city soon fell under Austro-Hungarian control.

On 2 December, the Serbian army launched a surprise counterattack all along the front. Valjevo and Užice were retaken by the Serbs on 8 December. The Austro-Hungarians retreated to Belgrade, which 5th Army commander Liborius Ritter von Frank deemed untenable. The Austro-Hungarians abandoned the city between 14 and 15 December and retreated into Austria-Hungary, allowing the Serbs to retake their capital the following day.

The Austro-Hungarians and the Serbs suffered heavy casualties, with more than 20,000 dead on each side. The defeat humiliated Austria-Hungary, which had hoped to occupy Serbia by the end of 1914. On 22 December, Potiorek and von Frank were relieved of their respective commands, and the 5th and 6th Armies were merged into a single 5th Army of 95,000 men.

== Background ==
On 28 June 1914, the Bosnian Serb student Gavrilo Princip assassinated Archduke Franz Ferdinand of Austria in Sarajevo. The assassination precipitated the July Crisis, which led Austria-Hungary to issue an ultimatum to Serbia on 23 July because it suspected that the assassination had been planned in Belgrade. The Austro-Hungarian ultimatum was designed to be unacceptable to Serbia and was indeed rejected. The Austro-Hungarians declared war on Serbia on 28 July. The same day, the Serbs destroyed all bridges on the Sava and Danube rivers to prevent the Austro-Hungarians from using them during any future invasion. Belgrade was shelled the following day, which marked the beginning of World War I.

Fighting in Eastern Europe began with the first Austro-Hungarian invasion of Serbia in early August 1914, under the command of Oskar Potiorek. The number of Austro-Hungarian troops assigned to the invasion was far smaller than the force of 308,000 that had been intended when war was declared since much of the Austro-Hungarian 2nd Army had moved to the Russian front. That reduced the number of troops involved in the initial stages of the invasion to approximately 200,000. On the other hand, the Serbs could muster some 450,000 men to oppose the Austro-Hungarians upon full mobilization. The main elements to face the Austro-Hungarians were the 1st, 2nd, 3rd and Užice Armies, with a combined strength of approximately 180,000 men. The Serbian Army was commanded by Crown Prince Alexander, with the chief of the Serbian general staff, Radomir Putnik, as his deputy and de facto military leader. Petar Bojović, Stepa Stepanović, Pavle Jurišić Šturm and Miloš Božanović commanded the 1st, 2nd, 3rd and Užice Armies, respectively.

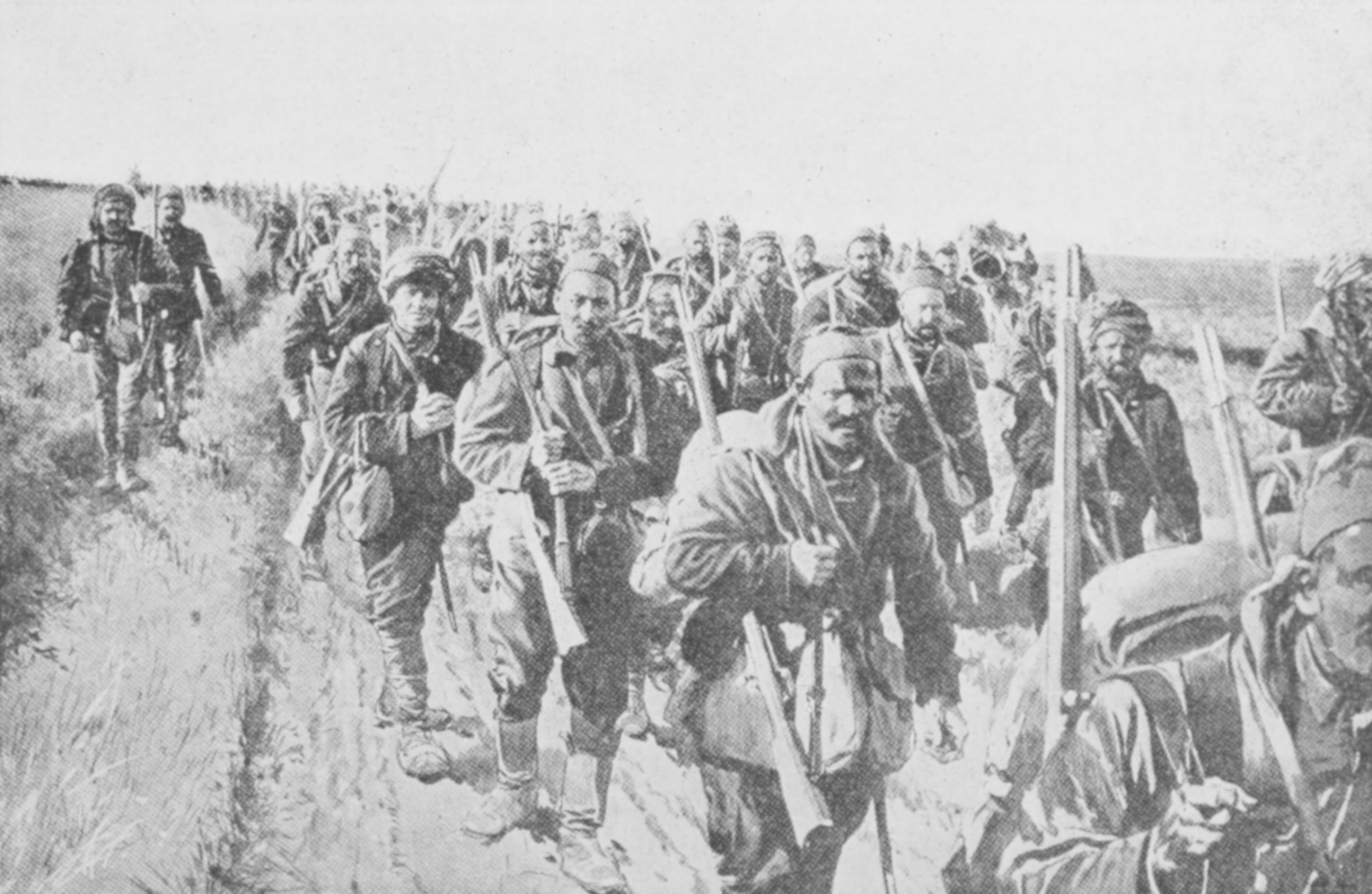
Serbian soldiers marching through the countryside, c. 1914

The Balkan Wars had only just concluded, and Serbia was still recovering. Over 36,000 Serbian soldiers had been killed and 55,000 seriously wounded. Few recruits had been gained from the newly acquired territories, and the Serbian army had been stretched by the need to garrison them against Albanian insurgents and the threat of a Bulgarian attack. To compound matters, the Serbs were dangerously short of artillery and had only begun replenishing their ammunition stocks. Their supply problems also extended to more basic items. Many soldiers lacked any uniform other than a standard issue greatcoat and a traditional Serbian cap known as a šajkača. Rifles were also in critically short supply. It was estimated that fully mobilizing would leave about 50,000 Serbian soldiers lacking equipment. The Austro-Hungarians, on the other hand, had an abundance of modern rifles, twice as many machine guns and field guns as the Serbs also had better stocks of munitions and much better transport and industrial infrastructure behind them. The Serbs had a slight advantage over the Austro-Hungarians, as many of their soldiers were experienced veterans of the Balkan Wars and were better trained than their Austro-Hungarian counterparts. The Serbian soldiers were also highly motivated, partially compensating for their lack of weaponry.

The Serbs beat back an Austro-Hungarian invasion in August at the Battle of Cer. That marked the first Allied victory over the Central Powers in World War I. Potiorek was humiliated by the defeat and was determined to resume the assault against the Serbs. He was permitted in September to launch another invasion of Serbia if he did not "risk anything that might lead to a further fiasco." Under pressure from the Russians to launch their offensive and to keep as many Austro-Hungarian troops as possible away from the Eastern Front, the Serbs invaded Bosnia in September with the help of Chetnik irregulars until being repulsed after a month of fighting in what came to be known as the Battle of the Drina. Bojović was wounded during the battle and was replaced by Živojin Mišić as commander of the Serbian 1st Army.

== Prelude ==
=== Austro-Hungarian plans ===
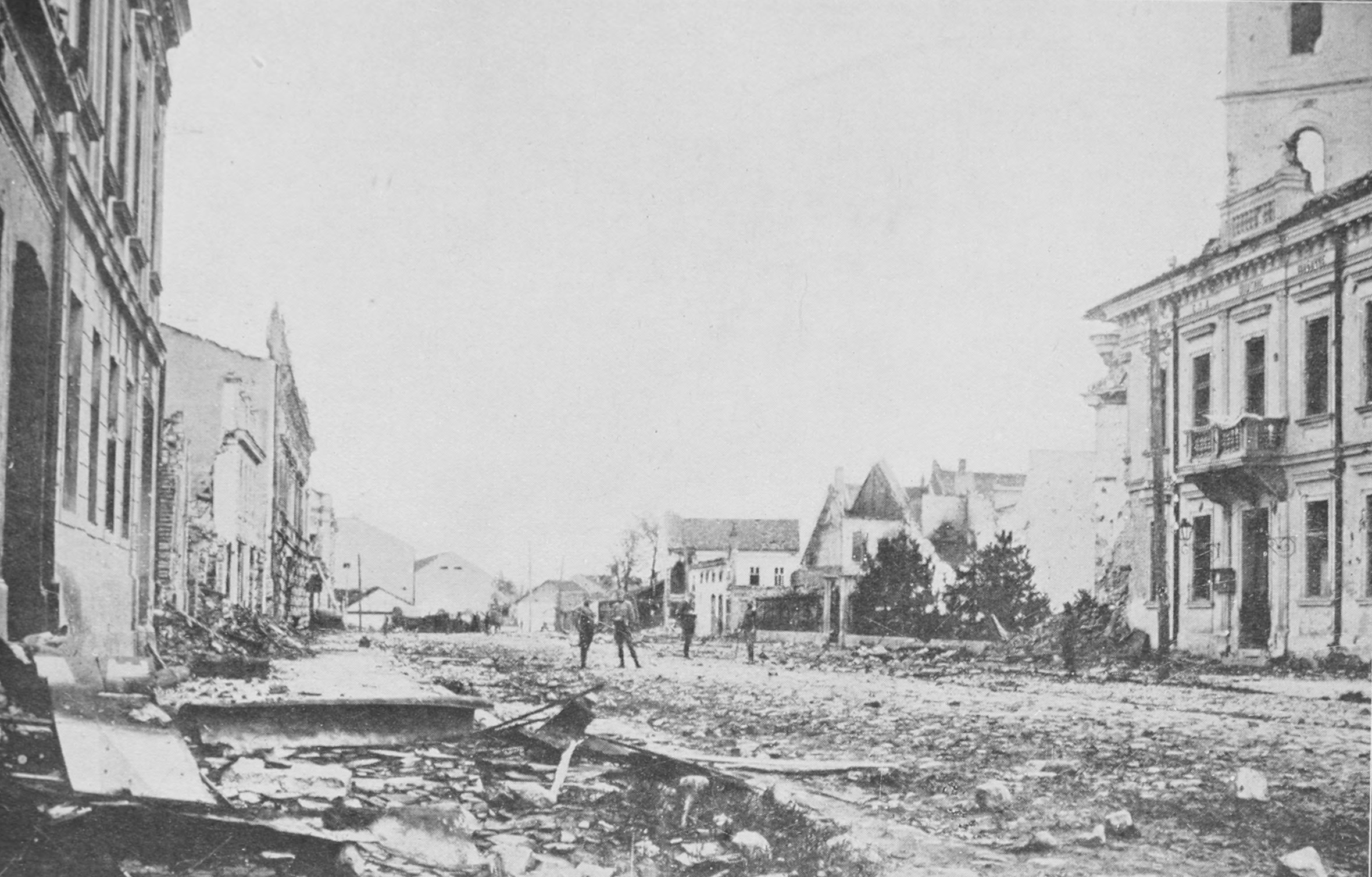
Aftermath of the Austro-Hungarian bombardment of Šabac in October 1914

The Armeeoberkommando (AOK) acknowledged that an undefeated Serbia severed Austria-Hungary's connection to the Ottoman Empire and prevented the completion of the Berlin–Baghdad railway. The AOK also realized that the Austro-Hungarian Army's inability to defeat Serbia would discourage neutral countries such as Bulgaria, Romania and Greece, from joining the Central Powers and would tempt Italy to open up a third front against Austria-Hungary. Nevertheless, the AOK hesitated to authorize a third invasion of Serbia. That changed in September 1914, when Austro-Hungarian troops discovered a map in an abandoned Semlin bookshop titled The New Division of Europe. Originally printed in a Russian newspaper, the map was widely sold in Serbia and depicted the borders of Europe as they would appear after the war. Germany was to be divided into northern and southern confederations. Austria-Hungary was to be abolished; its eastern provinces were to be ceded to Russia, Romania, the Czechs and the Hungarians; and its southern provinces were to be divided between Serbia and Italy. Alarmed by the prospect of Austria-Hungary's disintegration, Emperor Franz Joseph personally authorized a third invasion of Serbia in early October 1914.

Having just repelled the Serbian incursion into Bosnia, the Austro-Hungarian Army regrouped and positioned itself for one final invasion before winter set in. Potiorek was again placed in charge of Austro-Hungarian forces and was given command of the Austro-Hungarian 6th Army. The Austro-Hungarian 5th Army was commanded by Liborius Ritter von Frank. The Austro-Hungarians had 450,000 troops at their disposal. The Serbian army had 400,000 soldiers ready to face the Austro-Hungarian advance. Potiorek appeared confident: "Soldiers of the 5th and 6th armies, the goal of this war is nearly attained—the destruction of the enemy. The three-month campaign is almost over; we must only break the enemy's last resistance before the onset of winter". The Serbs were exhausted and demoralized. (Note: Interrogations of Serbian prisoners-of-war revealed that Serbian soldiers had not been fed or paid adequately since the war began. Many prisoners ridiculed Serbian Prime Minister Nikola Pašić for "leading the country into war" and spoke of "regular abuse" at the hands of their "brutal officers." Such comments appeared to convince Potiorek that the Serbian army was nearing collapse.) In a telegram to Putnik dated 27 October 1914, Stepanović complained that the 2nd Army did not have enough shells to resist the Austro-Hungarians effectively and requested to be removed from his command; (Note: "We have yet to receive shells; the enemy is bombarding our trenches and we have nothing to fire back. My men are dying under this fire, and I have no reserves to replace them with, and no shells to limit the casualties; I thus feel incapable and powerless, and request removal from this command".) Putnik denied the request, but ordered all units to resist the Austro-Hungarian advance for as long as possible before they retreated. That strategy had worked in Putnik's favour during the summer months until heavy rainfall in September and early October had reduced Serbia's roads to "muddy quagmires," making the movement of troops, guns and wagons increasingly hard. Potiorek recognized that the Serbian army was in a difficult situation; he was certain that a third invasion would bring him the decisive victory that he so desperately wanted.

In Vienna and Sarajevo, Austro-Hungarian officials began planning for the occupation and dismantling of Serbia. The country was to be plundered, with its territory used to bribe the neutral Balkan states into joining the Central Powers. The Romanians would get the region of the Timok Valley and the Bulgarians Macedonia and southeastern Serbia. The Austro-Hungarians intended to annex everything west of the Morava river, as well as the cities of Scutari (Shkodër) and Durazzo (Durrës), in northern Albania. The Serbs living west of the Morava, or "the compact masses of the Serbian element," as the Austro-Hungarians called them, were to be expelled and replaced with Austrian settlers, who would "change the psychology [of the region], making Serbia more Habsburg [and] less Serbian in outlook." Ludwig Thallóczy, the section chief of the Austro-Hungarian Finance Ministry, wrote Potiorek in October to recommend "the West Europeanization of the Serbs with a strong hand" as soon as Serbia had been occupied.

Potiorek planned to launch a converging attack across northern and western Serbia. The 5th Army was to capture Valjevo and envelope the Kolubara River from the north as the 6th Army was to secure the Jagodnja plateau and outflank Serbian units on the Kolubara from the south. The capture of the southeastern Serbian city of Niš was Potiorek's primary objective. Niš had been Serbia's capital since July and was a crucial transportation hub for its military. It also acted as a clearing house for munitions produced at the arsenal in Kragujevac. The city's capture would cut Serbia into two and scatter the Serbian army.

=== Third Austro-Hungarian invasion of Serbia ===
All of the valleys of northwestern Serbia were swamped by constant rainfall. The mountains had been covered in snow since early October. Acknowledging the opportunity such conditions presented, Putnik told his closest advisors: "All my strategy consists in placing the 'Serbian national mud' between the enemy's fighting line and his supplies." On 31 October, von Frank's 5th Army pushed into the region between the Sava and Drina rivers, while Potiorek's 6th Army drove west across the Drina and into the Jagodnja plateau. Austria-Hungary's third invasion of Serbia commenced on 6 November 1914, with intense artillery fire striking a series of Serbian border towns. On 7 November, the Austro-Hungarian 5th and 6th Armies attacked across the Drina. Outnumbered and in desperate need of ammunition, the Serbian army offered fierce resistance but was forced to retreat. The 3rd Army fell back against a road by the Jadar River to block the Austro-Hungarian advance towards Valjevo, and the 1st Army retreated southward into the Serbian interior. The Užice Army managed to prevent the Austro-Hungarians from crossing the Drina.

On 8 November, the Austro-Hungarians attacked the Serbian 2nd Army near Cer Mountain, coming within 1.6 kilometres (0.99 mi) of the Serbian frontline, entrenching themselves at the foot of the mountain. The 2nd Army was given orders to hold the Austro-Hungarians for as long as possible and, if its position became untenable, to retreat towards the right bank of the Dobrava River and position itself to block the approach to Valjevo. Elsewhere, the Austro-Hungarians drove a wedge between the 1st and the 3rd Armies and forced another Serbian retreat. Later that day, the Serbian government and the Serbian Supreme Command held a joint session concerning their worsening military position. Putnik stressed that Serbia needed to hold the Kolubara and the towns within its vicinity and suggested that the Serbs make a separate peace with Austria-Hungary if that proved impossible. That notion was rejected by Pašić, who urged further resistance to the Austro-Hungarians and threatened his government's resignation if peace discussions began. The session ended with the Serbian government and the Supreme Command agreeing to fight on.

=== Serbian retreat ===
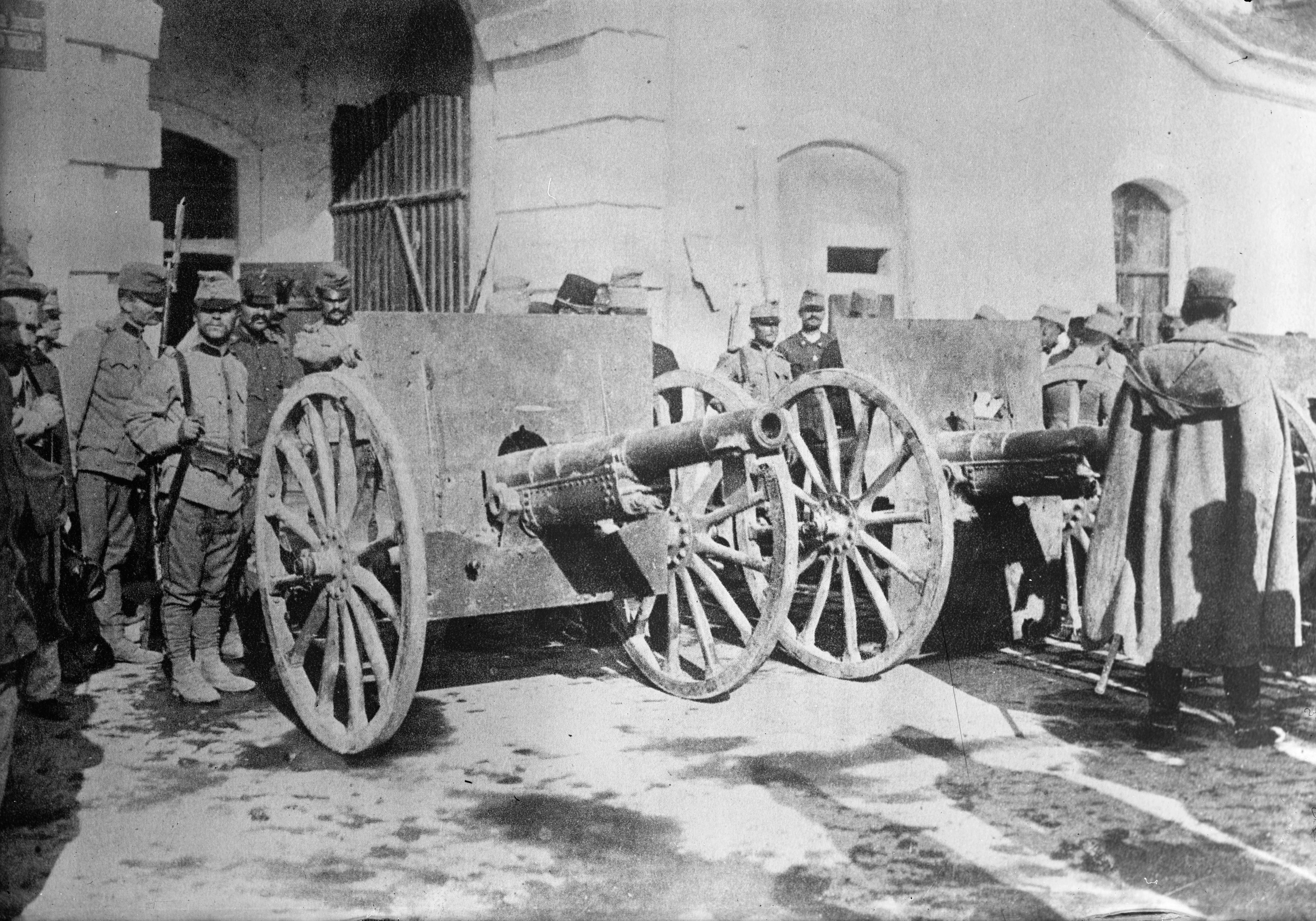
Austro-Hungarian soldiers stand beside captured Serbian artillery.

Putnik reasoned that Austro-Hungarian supply lines would become overstretched as their forces pressed deeper into Serbia, while the Serbs would continue to hold the railheads in the Serbian interior. On 10 November, he ordered a general retreat from the Jadar, withdrew the Serbian 2nd Army to Ub, and positioned the 1st and the 3rd Armies north and west of Valjevo. Meanwhile, the Užice Army took up positions to defend the town from which it took its name. The Austro-Hungarians pressed on after the Serbs and hoped to capture the Obrenovac–Valjevo railroad. Clashes ensued, and the Serbian army prevented the Austro-Hungarians from taking the railroad for a while. It quickly became evident to Putnik that he had underestimated the Austro-Hungarians, who managed to bring their heavy artillery through the muddy Serbian country roads. They established firing positions on the Serbian side of the Drina and began targeting the Serbian army, which suffered heavy casualties. Morale plummeted amongst the Serbs, who were already significantly demoralized from a lack of cold-weather clothing and ammunition and were exhausted by the long retreat toward the Serbian interior. Putnik realized that his forces would need to regroup to provide effectual resistance. He ordered the abandonment of Valjevo and had the Serbian army take positions on the Kolubara. The retreat towards the river was long and excruciating, with the Serbs being forced to destroy all bridges and telephone lines so they would not fall into Austro-Hungarian hands. The Serbian army also abandoned the bulk of its heavy equipment to speed up the withdrawal. Seeing that the situation was critical and that Serbian forces lacked artillery, ammunition and supplies, Pašić sought the help of the Triple Entente. He sent a telegram to his envoys abroad, which read: "Urgent help is required. Beg and plead". France provided the Serbs with munitions and supplies. Representatives of Russia and the United Kingdom "expressed understanding" but failed to deliver weapons and munitions.

The Austro-Hungarians entered Valjevo on 15 November, which prompted wild public celebrations in Vienna. Franz Joseph praised Potiorek for seizing the town, cities across the empire made Potiorek an honorary citizen, and Sarajevo even named a street after him. Valjevo's capture led the Austro-Hungarians to believe that they were on the verge of defeating Serbia and that its army was no longer a coherent fighting force. However, the scorched earth tactics that the Serbs had used during their withdrawal complicated the Austro-Hungarian advance. Although the Austro-Hungarians correctly assumed the Serbian army to be exhausted, its defensive positions along the Kolubara had been prepared months in advance. Putnik's carefully-timed withdrawals had ensured that the losses of the Serbian army were lighter than if it had stood and fought pitched battles with the Austro-Hungarians. Also, the geography of northwestern Serbia favoured defensive operations since the approaches to the Kolubara did not offer any cover for armies invading from the direction of Austria-Hungary, and the river itself was surrounded by mountainous terrain. In October, the Serbs fortified the Jeljak and the Maljen mountain ranges in anticipation of an Austro-Hungarian attack. That gave the Serbs an advantage over the Austro-Hungarians by placing the former in control of all roads leading to Kragujevac. The Serbs also established a series of field fortifications blocking the approach to Niš. The extensive series of fortifications and the difficulty of the terrain that they faced left the Austro-Hungarians with no choice but to conduct gruelling operations in the Serbian countryside, with almost no lines of communication.

== Battle ==
=== 16–26 November ===
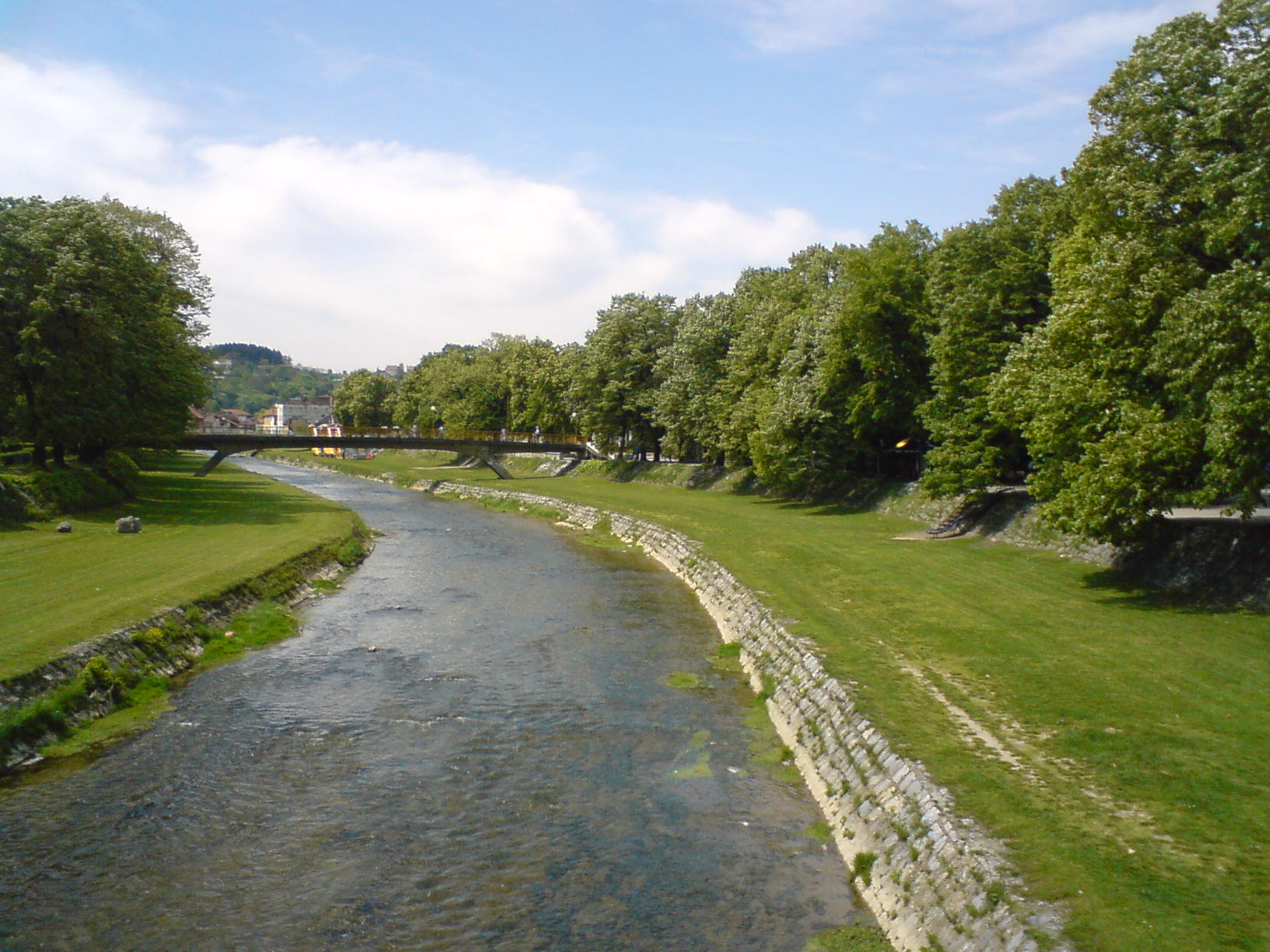
The Kolubara River in Valjevo

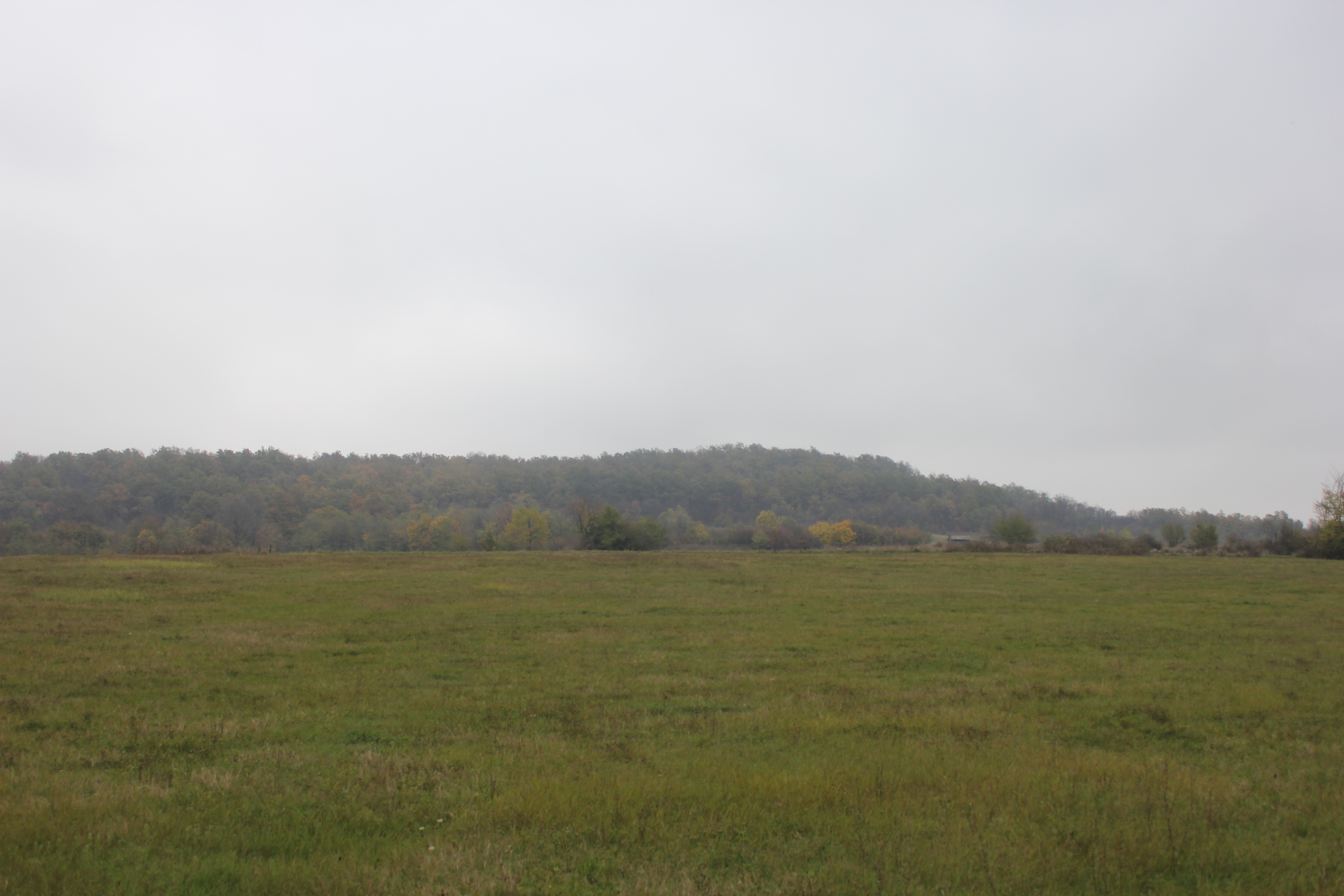
Cliffs of Vrače brdo, a hill near bank of River Kolubara at which the Serbian Army was entrenched during the Battle of Kolubara in November 1914

The Austro-Hungarians reached the Kolubara on 16 November and launched an assault against Serbian defensive positions there the following day. The Serbs managed to force the Austro-Hungarians back, and for the next five days, both armies fought a series of battles under heavy rain and snowfall. Both sides suffered heavy casualties, with a large number of soldiers succumbing to frostbite and hypothermia.

The Austro-Hungarian assault began at Lazarevac, a strategically located town just south of Belgrade whose capture would have given them access to the Mladenovac railway line and the ability to outflank the Serbian forces holding the road to Belgrade. Further south, the Austro-Hungarians attacked the Serbian 1st army. During the assault, they made the mistake of attacking its better-defended right flank and were met with determined Serbian resistance, which prevented them from gaining any ground. The military historian David Jordan notes that if the Austro-Hungarians had attacked the junction splitting the 1st and Užice armies, they might have cut the Serbs down the centre and gotten hold of an unimpeded passage to the Morava River. The Serbian 1st army quickly reinforced its left flank and realized that any subsequent attack against it would be far less easy to repel.

During the night of 18 November, the Austro-Hungarians moved into position to carry out a further assault, which began the following morning. Their main goals were to break through the defenses of the Serbian 2nd army, which was concentrated primarily around Lazarevac, and to drive the Serbian 1st army back towards the town of Gornji Milanovac while they simultaneously assaulted Serbian positions around the villages of Čovka and Vrače Brdo, which threatened the Austro-Hungarian flank. The Austro-Hungarians gained a foothold at Vrače Brdo by the evening of 19 November and seized higher ground from the Serbs further to the south. The Serbian 1st army was forced to retreat the following day, which allowed the Austro-Hungarians to advance down the main routes leading to Kragujevac. Though Potiorek believed that Putnik might be trying to lure the Austro-Hungarians deeper into Serbia to encircle them so that he could attack their flanks, he correctly assessed that the Serbian army was in no position to carry out such an attack.

The Austro-Hungarians made a renewed attack against the 1st army on 21 November and forced the Serbs back after a series of brutal engagements. The Austro-Hungarians then advanced towards Mount Maljen and aimed to drive the 1st Serbian army from its positions there. The Serbs withdrew from the mountain after three days of heavy fighting. Potiorek decided not to pursue this and to allow the Serbs to make an orderly withdrawal. The Austro-Hungarians had suffered heavy casualties, and the intensity of the fighting had caused them to lose cohesion. As they advanced deeper into Serbia, the terrain became increasingly harsh and exhausted the already-tired Austro-Hungarian soldiers. While the Serbian 1st army withdrew, the 2nd and the 3rd armies fiercely resisted the Austro-Hungarian advance. Thar led Potiorek to reinforce his positions around Lazarevac, which he aimed to capture and use as a pivot from which to attack Kragujevac while his right flank pushed down the West Morava valley. The Austro-Hungarian advances convinced Potiorek that his army had the upper hand. He planned for his forces to pursue the surviving soldiers from the Serbian 2nd and 3rd Armies and predicted that the Serbian 1st and Užice Armies would be forced to manoeuvre towards Belgrade and Lazarevac, where they would be encircled and destroyed. As a result, combat on the outskirts of Lazarevac intensified once again, and the Serbian army managed to repulse every Austro-Hungarian assault despite a lack of ammunition. The Serbs began to run out of shells, and Stepanović asked the Serbian Supreme Command for the artillery of the 2nd army to be redirected to its rear, as he felt that its failure to contribute to the defence of Lazarevac had frustrated his troops and hurt their morale. Putnik instructed Stepanović to keep the artillery of the 2nd army on the front and told him that the Russians had sent artillery shells for its guns. Stepanović was skeptical but kept it on the front line as instructed.

By 24 November, Potiorek predicted that Serbia would be defeated within a matter of days and appointed Stjepan Sarkotić to be the country's governor once occupied. The Austro-Hungarians made further gains on 25 November and forced the Serbian Army from Čovka and Vrače Brdo with an intense artillery bombardment. On 26 November, they attempted to cross the Kolubara at its junction with the Sava River and managed to do so in their initial attack. The Serbs soon counterattacked, forced the invaders back, inflicted 50% casualties on the Austro-Hungarians and caused their offensive to grind to a halt. On 27 November, the Serbian army attacked Čovka and Vrače Brdo and succeeded in forcing the Austro-Hungarians out.

=== Fall of Belgrade ===
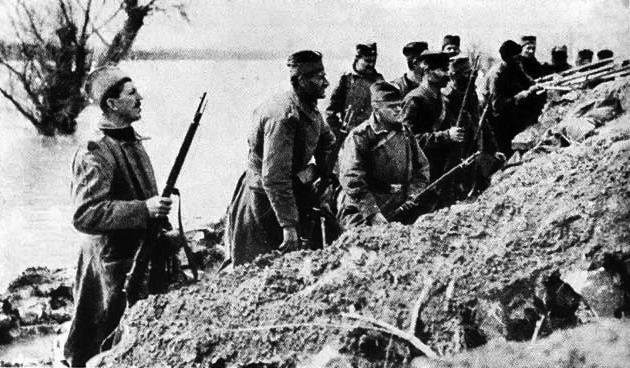
Serbian soldiers on the island of Ada Ciganlija, in Belgrade

Although the Serbian army had put up fierce resistance and inflicted heavy casualties on the Austro-Hungarians, Putnik became concerned that his lines were overextended. He began contemplating another strategic withdrawal in which Belgrade would need to be evacuated. On the night of 26–27 November, the Austro-Hungarian 6th Army attacked all along the front and pushed deeper into the Serbian interior.

Defending along an overextended front, the Serbian Supreme Command abandoned Belgrade. The city was evacuated on 29–30 November. The Austro-Hungarians entered it on 1 December, prompting even more celebrations in Vienna. The Serbian people withdrew alongside their army, and many retreated to Niš, where news of Belgrade's fall was greeted "impassively" since it had been "expected since the beginning of the war." Albin Kutschbach, a German agent in Niš, reported: "More refugees are arriving by the day, and despite many people being sent south, there are certainly still 60,000 people here". Germany responded to the capture of Belgrade with delight and sent a congratulatory telegram to the Austro-Hungarian leadership. The Austro-Hungarians ascertained that their war against Serbia would soon end and began preparing for its occupation. On 2 December, the anniversary of Franz Joseph's 66th year on the throne, Potiorek wrote that he was "laying town and fortress Belgrade at His Majesty's feet."

=== Serbian counterattack ===
It became increasingly clear to both Potiorek and Putnik that the Austro-Hungarian supply lines were overextended, so on 1 December, Potiorek ordered the Austro-Hungarian 6th Army to stop and to wait for the 5th army to secure its supply lines east of the Valjevo railway. That resulted in a short pause to all Austro-Hungarian military operations. Mišić exploited the brief respite by withdrawing the Serbian 1st army a full 19 kilometres (12 mi) from the front line and ensuring that his soldiers had an opportunity to rest. The Serbian Army then converged around Mount Rudnik, where it received long-promised supplies from its allies via the Niš–Salonika railroad. Putnik's confidence in the ability of his army to launch a counterattack was restored.

On 2 December, he ordered his forces to attack the Austro-Hungarians all along the front, informing his officers that the offensive would be specifically to improve Serbian morale. Determined to play his part, the aging Serbian King Peter I took a rifle and accompanied his troops to the front. The Serbian offensive caught the Austro-Hungarians by surprise, and when the attack was launched, they were holding a large military parade through the streets of Belgrade. The Austro-Hungarians now found themselves defending along an overextended front, as Potiorek had just begun strengthening his left flank, which left the front line very lightly held. Potiorek knew he could avoid a reversal on the battlefield by preventing the Serbian 1st army from reaching the Kolubara and Morava Rivers. But the Serbs were confident after discovering that the Austro-Hungarians had failed to adequately prepare for a Serbian counterattack, as their artillery was well behind the front line. That meant the Austro-Hungarian defenders could not use their heavy guns to break up any Serbian advance. Rested and resupplied, the Serbs pushed forward toward Belgrade. By the night of 2 December, the Serbian 1st army had advanced several kilometres past Austro-Hungarian lines, taken many prisoners and inflicted heavy casualties on the Austro-Hungarians. The 2nd and the 3rd Armies captured several vital positions on high ground, and the Užice Army met fierce resistance but ultimately pushed back the Austro-Hungarians.

The offensive's initial success greatly enhanced the morale of Serbian troops, just as Putnik had wanted. Significantly weakened, the Austro-Hungarians did not have time to recover before the offensive resumed the next day. They had been forced into retreat by the end of the day. On 6 December, the British ambassador to Serbia informed the British Government that the Serb offensive was "progressing brilliantly." That day, the Serbian army had broken the Austro-Hungarians at their centre and on their right flank. Outmanoeuvred, the Austro-Hungarians were forced into a full retreat and abandoned their weapons and equipment as they went. Meanwhile, the Austro-Hungarians attempted to consolidate control around Belgrade. On 7 December, they attacked the right flank of the Serbian army in the city's outskirts.

On 8 December, the Austro-Hungarians fell back against Užice and Valjevo. Though the Serbs anticipated their opponents would entrench themselves and attempt to block the Serbian army's advance, the Austro-Hungarians had failed to construct any defensive networks and weren't in a position to block the Serbian offensive. Though the Austro-Hungarians had ensured that Valjevo's defences were fortified and had laid down artillery plans for the town's defense, their lack of prior preparation meant the hills surrounding the town had no significant defensive positions. The Serbs exploited that weakness by manoeuvring around the hills, encircling the Austro-Hungarians and suffering minimal casualties. The Serbian 3rd Army then broke through the defenses of the 6th Army at Mount Suvobor and stormed Valjevo. In Niš, the Bulgarian ambassador to Serbia reported, "The most improbable news from the battleground, sweet to the Serb ear, has been going around since this morning." He wrote that in the last three to four days, the Serbian army had captured one Austro-Hungarian general, 49 officers and more than 20,000 troops, including 40 cannons and "huge quantities of war matériel." By 9 December, the Austro-Hungarian counteroffensive around Belgrade had lost momentum, and the Austro-Hungarians began to retreat towards the city centre. One Austro-Hungarian soldier wrote, "We could not have imagined that the Serbs were on our heels since we had recently been victorious." On 10 December, the Serbian army captured the lower reaches of the Drina and forced most of the surviving Austro-Hungarian troops to flee across it. They did not stop until they had crossed the Sava and the Danube and entered the Banat. Very few Austro-Hungarian soldiers made it back to Bosnia.

On 13 December, von Frank informed Potiorek that he considered it impossible for Austro-Hungarian forces to remain in Belgrade for much longer. As a result, Potiorek ordered the ones in the city to withdraw. The Austro-Hungarians left Belgrade on 14 and 15 December and retreated to Austria-Hungary, covered by their river monitors on the Sava and the Danube. The Serbian army re-entered Belgrade on 15 December and had total control of the city by the end of the following day.

== Aftermath ==
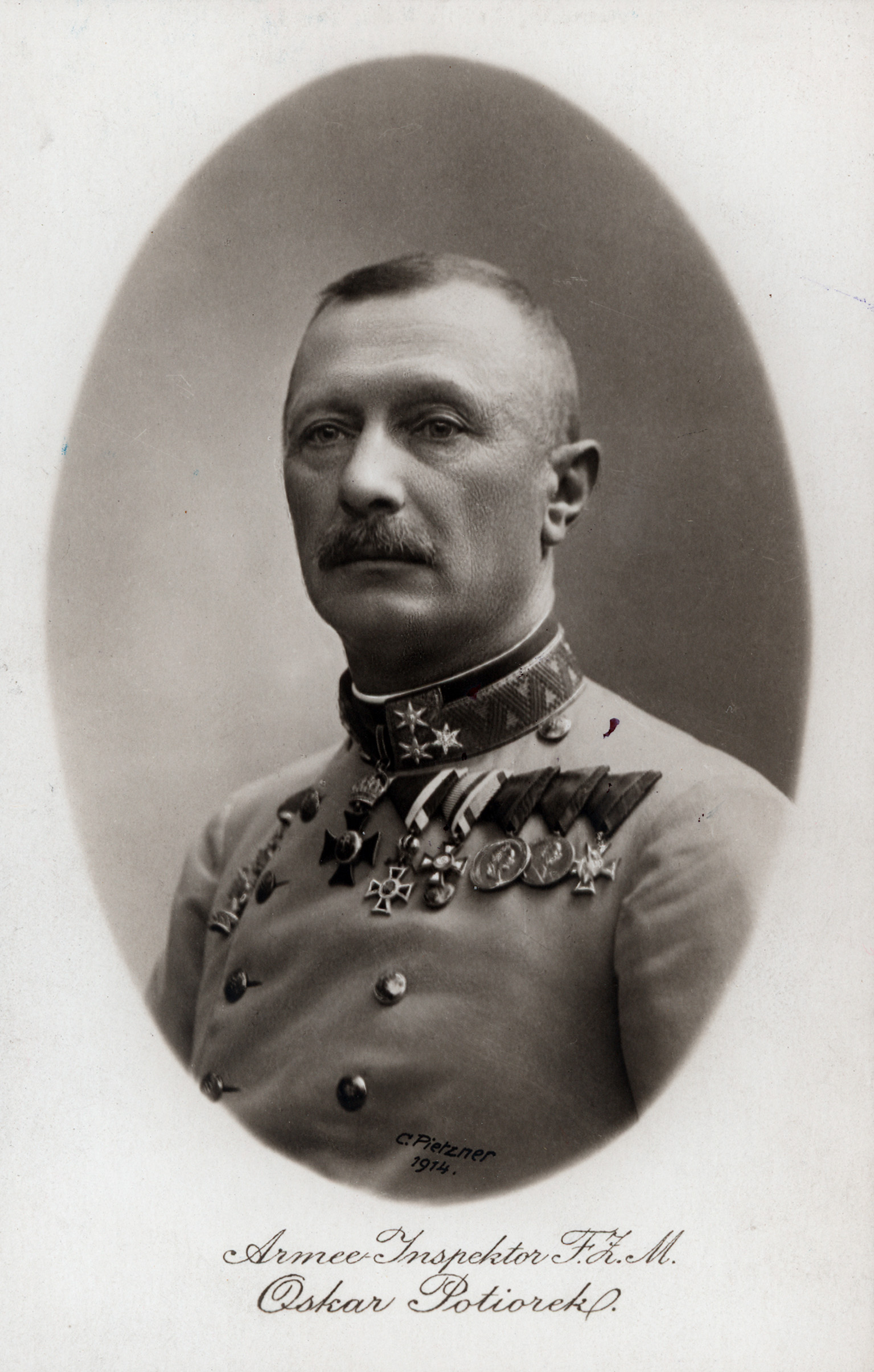
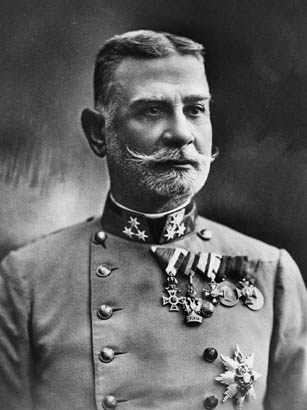
Oskar Potiorek (left) was dismissed as Austro-Hungarian commander in the Balkans and relieved as commander of the 6th army. His deputy, Liborius Ritter von Frank (right), lost command of the 5th army.

The battle ended in a decisive Serbian victory. A directive issued by the Serbian Supreme Command on 16 December reported: "The recapture of Belgrade marks the successful end of a great and magnificent period in our operations. The enemy is beaten, dispersed, defeated and expelled from our territory once and for all." Franz Conrad von Hötzendorf, the Austro-Hungarian Chief of the General Staff, attributed the defeat to a Serbian "thunderbolt from the south." The battle achieved none of Austria-Hungary's objectives: it failed to knock Serbia out of the war, induce Bulgaria to join the Central Powers, and convince Romania to stay neutral. Austro-Hungarian historians concluded after the battle that defeat by Serbia constituted "a serious diminution in the Dual Monarchy's prestige and self-confidence." The battle, like the Battle of Cer before it, drew considerable attention to Serbia, and many foreigners came to the country in late 1914 to offer political and humanitarian aid or to fight alongside the Serbian army. German publicist Maximilian Harden wrote: "Serbia has risen from its grave on the field of Kosovo. From the source of the Kolubara River, it will draw courage for the greatest battles of the whole century."

The Austro-Hungarians suffered about 225,000 casualties, including 30,000 killed, 173,000 wounded and 70,000 taken prisoner. They reported that 200 of their officers were taken prisoner during the battle, and more than 130 cannons, 70 heavy machine guns and a large quantity of matériel were captured. The Serbs also suffered heavy casualties, with 22,000 killed, 91,000 wounded and 19,000 missing or captured. The Western press was appalled with the scale of atrocities committed by the Austro-Hungarian troops against Serbian civilians, including women and children. William Shepard of the United Press confirmed as an eyewitness that at least 11 towns were abandoned, and all of northwestern Serbia was nearly depopulated.

Mišić was promoted to the rank of Vojvoda for his command during the battle. Potiorek, on the other hand, was relieved of command on 22 December for "this most ignominious, rankling and derisory defeat." The decision reportedly made him suicidal. He was replaced by Archduke Eugen of Austria, who the Austro-Hungarians hoped would "restore Habsburg forces to the glory days of Prince Eugene." Von Frank was dismissed as commander of the 5th Army and replaced by Karl Tersztyánszky von Nádas, who had commanded the 4th Corps at the Battle of Cer. The 5th and the 6th Armies were then merged into a single 5th Army consisting of 95,000 men.

Dobrica Ćosić's novel A Time of Death revolves around the battle. It was adapted into a stage play in 1983, titled The Battle of Kolubara.

== See also ==
- Battle of Cer
- Battle of the Drina

== Sources ==
- Bataković, Dušan T.; Popović, Nikola B. (1989). Kolubarska bitka (in Serbian). Belgrade: Litera. OCLC 488380587.
- Buttar, Prit (2014). Collision of Empires: The War on the Eastern Front in 1914. Oxford: Osprey Publishing. ISBN 978-1-78200-648-0.
- Cove, Dennis; Westwell, Ian (2002). History of World War I. New York: Marshall Cavendish. ISBN 978-0-7614-7231-5.
- Glenny, Misha (2012). The Balkans: 1804–2012. London: Granta Books. ISBN 978-1-77089-273-6.
- Herwig, Holger H. (2014). The First World War: Germany and Austria-Hungary, 1914–1918 (2nd ed.). London: Bloomsbury Publishing. ISBN 978-1-4725-0885-0.
- Jestrovic, Silvija (2013). Space, Performance, Utopia: Cities of War, Cities of Exile. New York: Palgrave Macmillan. ISBN 978-0-230-29266-6.
- Jordan, David (2008). The Balkans, Italy & Africa 1914–1918: From Sarajevo to the Piave and Lake Tanganyika. London: Amber Books. ISBN 978-1-906626-14-3.
- Judah, Tim (2000). The Serbs: History, Myth and the Destruction of Yugoslavia (2nd ed.). New Haven, Connecticut: Yale University Press. ISBN 978-0-300-08507-5.
- Mitrović, Andrej (2007). Serbia's Great War, 1914–1918. West Lafayette, Indiana: Purdue University Press. ISBN 978-1-55753-477-4.
- Pavlowitch, Stevan K. (2002). Serbia: The History of an Idea. New York: New York University Press. ISBN 978-0-8147-6708-5.
- Shrader, Charles R. (2005). "Battle of Kolubara". In Tucker, Spencer (ed.). The Encyclopedia of World War I: A Political, Social, and Military History. Santa Barbara, California: ABC-CLIO. ISBN 978-1-85109-420-2.
- Strachan, Hew (2001). The First World War: To Arms. Vol. 1. Oxford: Oxford University Press. ISBN 978-0-19-820877-8.
- Wachtel, Andrew Baruch (1998). Making a Nation, Breaking a Nation: Literature and Cultural Politics in Yugoslavia. Stanford, California: Stanford University Press. ISBN 978-0-8047-3181-2.
- Wawro, Geoffrey (2014). A Mad Catastrophe: The Outbreak of World War I and the Collapse of the Habsburg Empire. New York: Basic Books. ISBN 978-0-465-02835-1.
