= 6th Army (Austria-Hungary) =

- 6. Armee
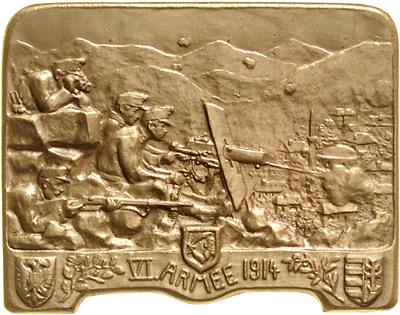
- Active: August 1914 – 27 December 1914; January 1918 – November 1918
- Country: Austria-Hungary
- Type: Field Army
- Part of: Balkanstreitkräfte
- Engagements: World War I; Battle of Drina; Battle of Kolubara; Battle of the Piave River; Battle of Vittorio Veneto

Commanders
- Notable commanders: Oskar Potiorek

The Austro-Hungarian Sixth Army was a field army of the Austro-Hungarian Army that fought during World War I as part of the Balkanstreitkräfte.

== Actions ==
The Sixth Army was formed in 1914 and the Austro-Hungarian mobilization following its declaration of war on Serbia and Russia. The Sixth Army was put under the command of Gen. Oskar Potiorek, who also was commander of the entire Balkan Front. Before the start of the invasion of Serbia Potiorek demanded that all the Serbs be removed from its units. Between August and December 1914, the 6th Army fought in the Serbian Campaign and suffered such enormous casualties that it was disbanded on 27 December 1914.

It participated in the

- Battle of Drina (September - October 1914)
- Battle of Kolubara (November - December 1914).

The Sixth Army was reestablished in January 1918 on the Italian Front, where it remained active until the end of the War.

It participated in the

- Battle of the Piave River (June 1918)
- Battle of Vittorio Veneto (October–November 1918)

== Commanders ==
- Oskar Potiorek : August 14–27 December 1914
- Archduke Joseph August of Austria : 15 January 1918 - 15 July 1918
- Alois Schönburg-Hartenstein : 15 July 1918 - 3 November 1918

== Sources ==
- DiNardo, R.L. (2015). Invasion: The Conquest of Serbia, 1915: The Conquest of Serbia, 1915. War, technology, and history. ABC-CLIO. ISBN 978-1-4408-0093-1.
- Schindler, J.R. (2015). Fall of the Double Eagle: The Battle for Galicia and the Demise of Austria-Hungary. Potomac Books, Incorporated. ISBN 978-1-61234-804-9.
