= Oskar Potiorek =

Austro-Hungarian general and official (1853–1933)

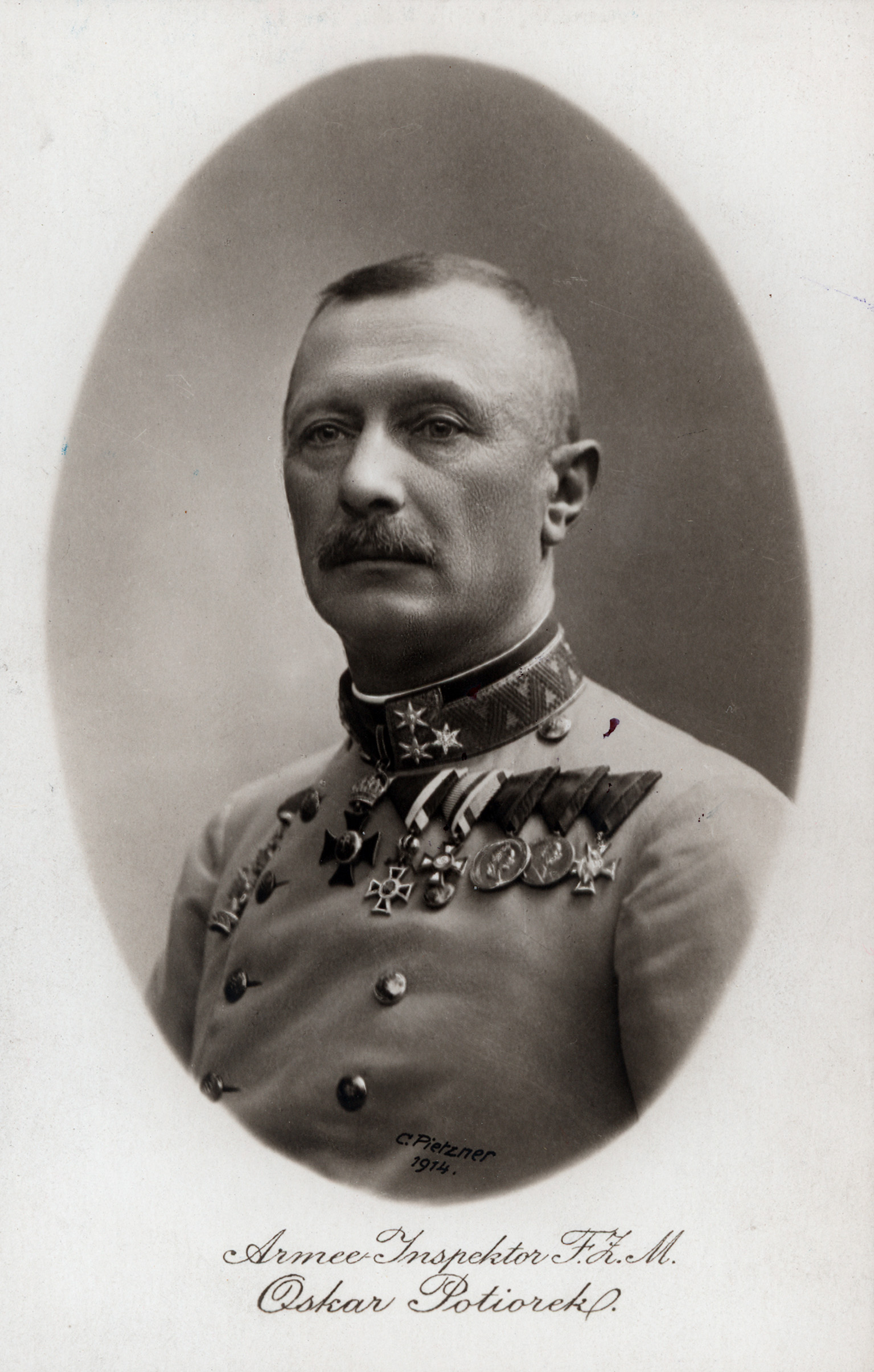
- Oskar Potiorek in 1908

8th Governor of Bosnia and Herzegovina
- In office 10 May 1911 – 22 December 1914
- Appointed by: Franz Joseph I of Austria
- Preceded by: Marijan Varešanin
- Succeeded by: Stjepan Sarkotić

Personal details
- Born: 20 November 1853 Bad Bleiberg, Carinthia, Austrian Empire
- Died: 17 December 1933 (aged 80) Klagenfurt, Republic of Austria
- Education: Kriegsschule Academy, Vienna
- Profession: Soldier
- Awards: Order of Saint Stephen of Hungary; Order of Leopold

Military service
- Allegiance: Austria-Hungary
- Branch/service: Austro-Hungarian Army
- Years of service: 1867–1915
- Rank: General of the Artillery
- Battles/wars: World War I: Serbian campaign (1914); Battle of Cer; Battle of Drina; Battle of Kolubara

Oskar Potiorek (20 November 1853 – 17 December 1933) was an officer of the Austro-Hungarian Army, who served as Governor of Bosnia and Herzegovina from 1911 to 1914. He was a passenger in the car carrying Archduke Franz Ferdinand of Austria and his wife Duchess Sophie of Hohenberg when they were assassinated in Sarajevo on 28 June 1914. Potiorek had failed to inform the driver of a change of route which led the royal car to take a wrong turn, stalling after trying to turn around, and ending up in front of Gavrilo Princip. In World War I, Potiorek commanded the Austro-Hungarian forces in the failed Serbian campaign of 1914. He was removed from command, retiring from the army shortly afterward.

== Early life ==
The Potiorek family had Czech origin, the family moved from Bohemia to Carinthia before the birth of Oskar. His father, Paul Potiorek decided to move to Carinthia after he was appointed as a chief inspector of mines in Bad Bleiberg. Oskar Potiorek was born in Bad Bleiberg on 20 November 1853. On September 1, 1871, he was commissioned as an officer. He entered military service in the 2nd technical regiment (Genieregiment) with the rank of lieutenant, where he was promoted to first lieutenant on May 1, 1873. Oskar attended the Imperial and Royal Military Institute of Technology and the Kriegsschule academy in Vienna. He was promoted to Captain on 1 May 1879 and in 1883 he served with the 17th Infantry Regiment. From 1886 he was again in the General Staff, in the Office of Operations and Special Staff Activities. Here he was promoted to the rank of Major on 1 May 1887 and Lieutenant Colonel on 1 November 1889. In 1890 he was transferred to the 7th Infantry Regiment for troop duty, in 1891 he was again transferred to the General Staff, in 1892 he was promoted to colonel and appointed head of the Office of Operations and Special Activities. On 1 May 1898, he was appointed commander of the 64th Infantry Brigade in Budapest with the rank of Major General. He was appointed deputy chief by Emperor Franz Joseph in 1902. However, the emperor ignored his ambitions, when in 1906 he filled the post of chief of staff with Feldmarschall-Leutnant Franz Conrad von Hötzendorf at the behest of heir presumptive and deputy commander-in-chief Archduke Franz Ferdinand. Potiorek became commanding general at Graz, Styria, in the rank of a Feldzeugmeister. Serving as inspector general in Sarajevo in 1910, he was appointed Bosnian governor (Landeschef) the next year, holding both civil and military offices.

He kept command of III Corps until April 1910, when he handed it over to Lieutenant General Karl Schikofsky.

Potiorek did his utmost to replace Conrad, his long-time rival. However his efforts were only partially successful: In 1911, when Franz Joseph replaced Conrad as Chief of the General Staff, but the Emperor appointed Lieutenant General Blasius Schemua as Chief of General Staff, and then Conrad again on 12 December 1912, in the middle of the Serbian crisis. The rivalry and antipathy between the two high rank officers had serious consequences during the Serbian campaigns in the autumn of 1914.

In 1913 Potiorek invited Franz Ferdinand and his wife, Sophie, to watch his troops on maneuvers scheduled for 26 and 27 June 1914. An attack on the life of former governor Marijan Varešanin in 1910 and several rumours of future assaults (leaked by Serbian prime minister Nikola Pašić) did not keep the archduke from a public appearance in Sarajevo, backed by Potiorek, who worried about his own prestige.

== Assassination of Archduke Ferdinand ==
On 28 June the royal couple arrived from Ilidža by train and went to Philipovic army camp where Franz Ferdinand performed a brief review of the troops. Potiorek was waiting to take the royal party to the city hall (present-day National and University Library of Bosnia and Herzegovina) for the official reception. Franz Ferdinand, his wife and several officials switched into a six-car motorcade driving down Appel Quay along Miljacka River without further security measures. Potiorek was in the third car, a Gräf & Stift Double Phaeton, open six-seater driven by Leopold Lojka, together with the owner Count Harrach and the royal couple. At 10:10, when the vehicles passed the central police station, assassin Nedeljko Čabrinović hurled a hand grenade at the archduke's car. Lojka accelerated when he saw the object flying towards the car, the grenade bounced off the coachwork and exploded under the wheel of the next car, wounding two passengers and several spectators.

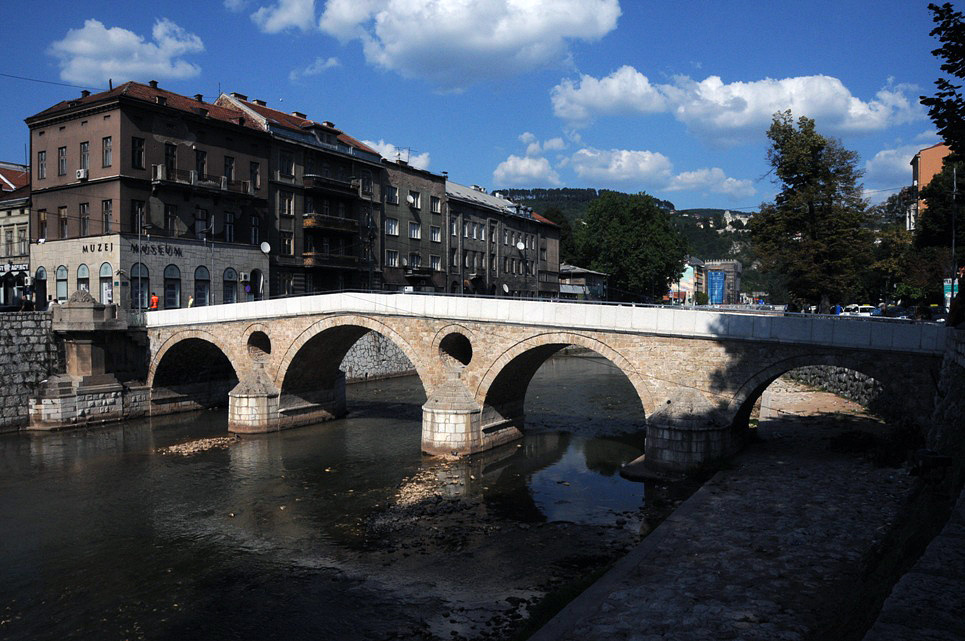
Latin Bridge, Sarajevo

A furious Franz Ferdinand, after attending the official reception at the City Hall, asked about visiting the members of his party that had been wounded by the bomb. A member of the archduke's staff, Andreas von Morsey, according to his own accounts suggested this might be dangerous, but Potiorek replied "Do you think Sarajevo is full of assassins? I will take responsibility". Nevertheless, the governor decided that the royal car should travel on an alternative route to the Sarajevo hospital. However, he failed to tell the driver about this decision. On the way to the hospital, Lojka took a right turn opposite the Latin Bridge, where one of the conspirators, Gavrilo Princip, was standing outside the corner delicatessen at the time. The assassin had already abandoned his plans, but when he saw the driver begin to back up the car right in front of him, he stepped forward, drew his gun, and at a distance of about four or five paces, fired two shots into the car. Franz Ferdinand was hit in the neck and Sophie in the abdomen. Neither Potiorek, Count Harrach nor Leopold Lojka were injured. Princip later claimed that the bullet that killed Sophie was meant for the governor.

== After Ferdinand's assassination ==
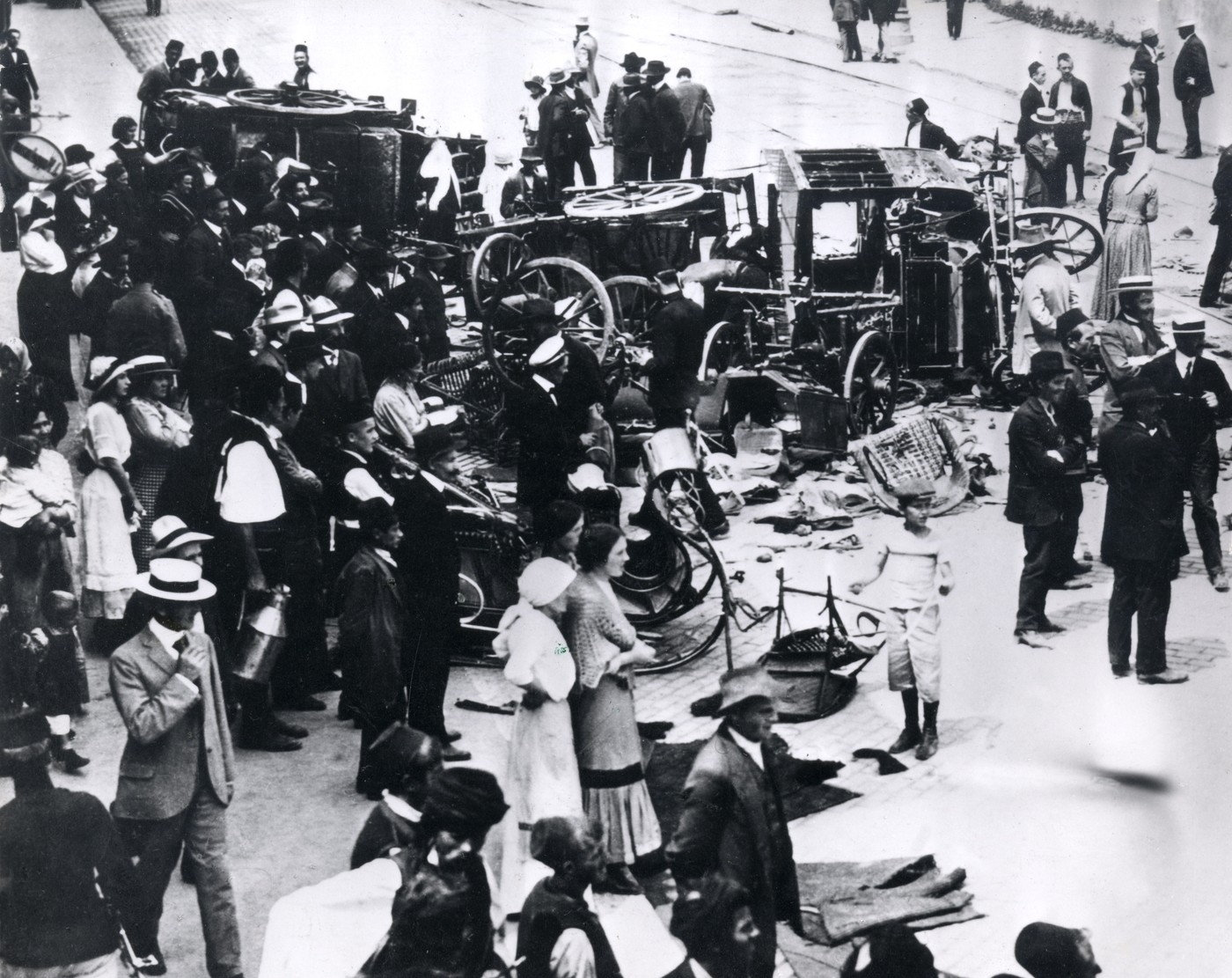
Anti-Serb violence in Sarajevo

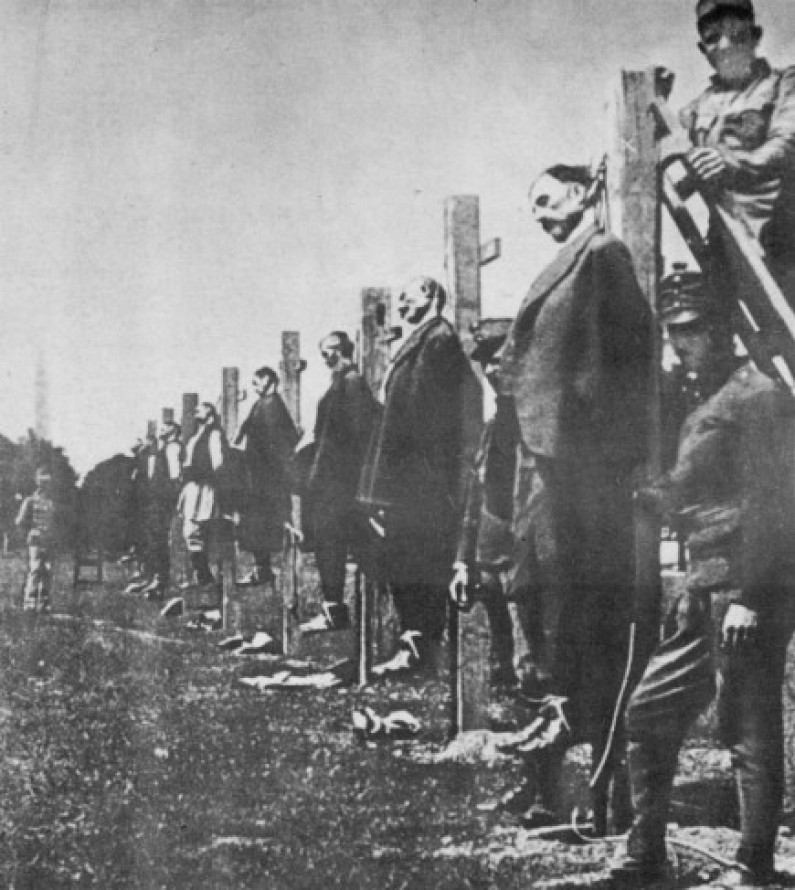
Austro-Hungarian soldiers hanging Serb civilians

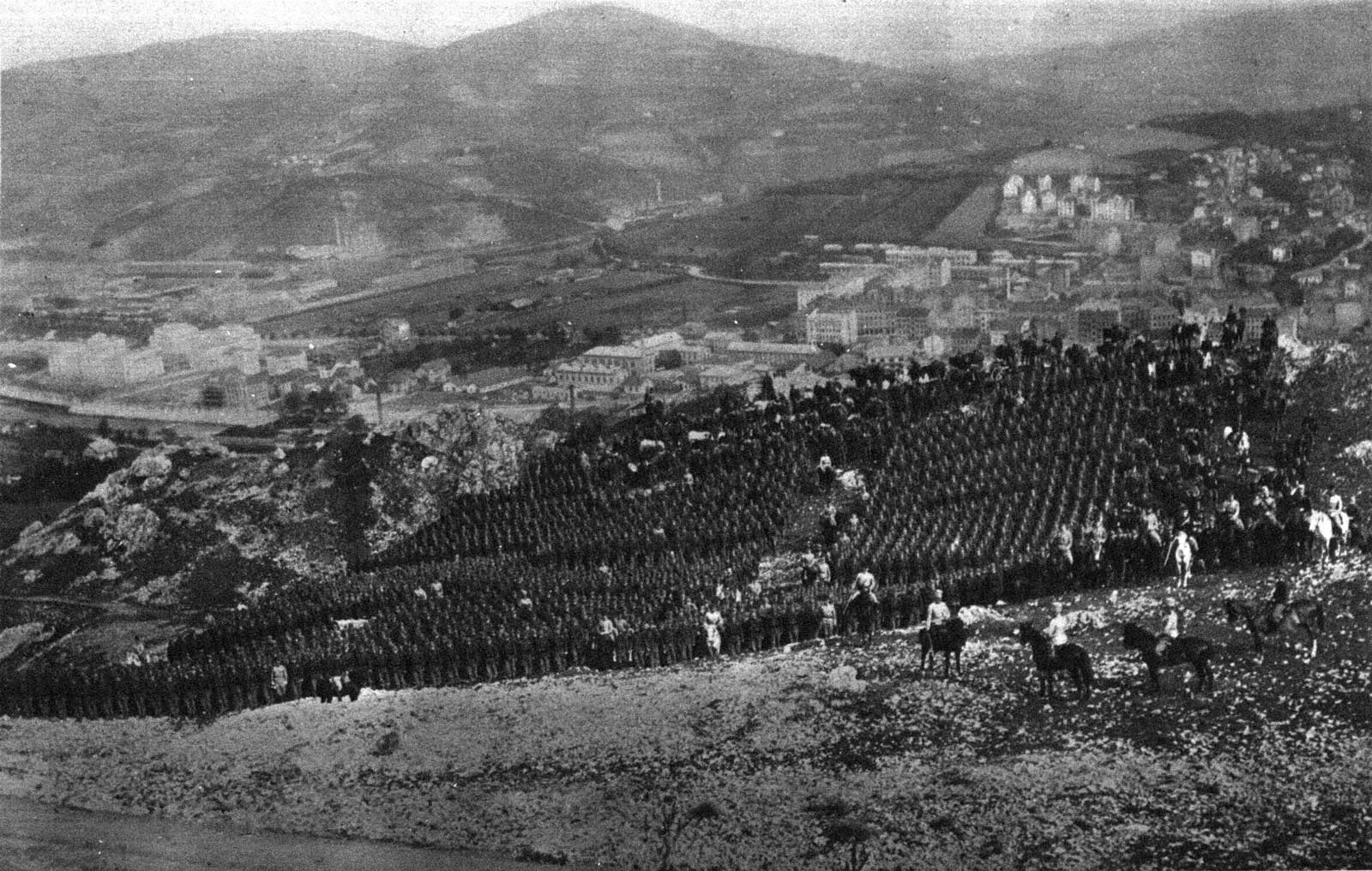
Mobilized Austro-Hungarian troops sent across Sarajevo for Serbia

Following the assassination, Potiorek organized and stimulated anti-Serb riots in Sarajevo. Potiorek reestablished an auxiliary militia, the Schutzkorps, to implement the policy of anti-Serb repression. Schutzkorps, predominantly recruited among Bosniak population, were involved in the persecution of people of Serb ethnicity particularly in Serb populated areas of eastern Bosnia. Around 5,500 ethnic Serbs were arrested in Bosnia and Herzegovina. Between 700 and 2,200 died in prison while 460 were executed. Around 5,200 Serb families were forcibly expelled from Bosnia and Herzegovina.

Despite his responsibility, Potiorek remained in office. When the assassination and the succeeding July Crisis led to the outbreak of World War I, he became the commander of the Balkanstreitkräfte (Balkan Armed Forces). It is speculated that this "survivor's guilt" led Potiorek to take charge of the Austro-Hungarian army and lead the first mission to "punish" Serbia. He was reportedly very zealous in his actions (multiple times he claimed "I was spared at Sarajevo so that I may die avenging it!"), but was apparently an inept commander. The small Royal Serbian Army remained undefeated in all major battles and after the textbook military disasters at the Battle of Cer and the Battle of Kolubara with huge numbers of casualties, he was removed from command on 22 December 1914 and replaced by Archduke Eugen of Austria, a choice that reportedly made him suicidal.

== Death and legacy ==
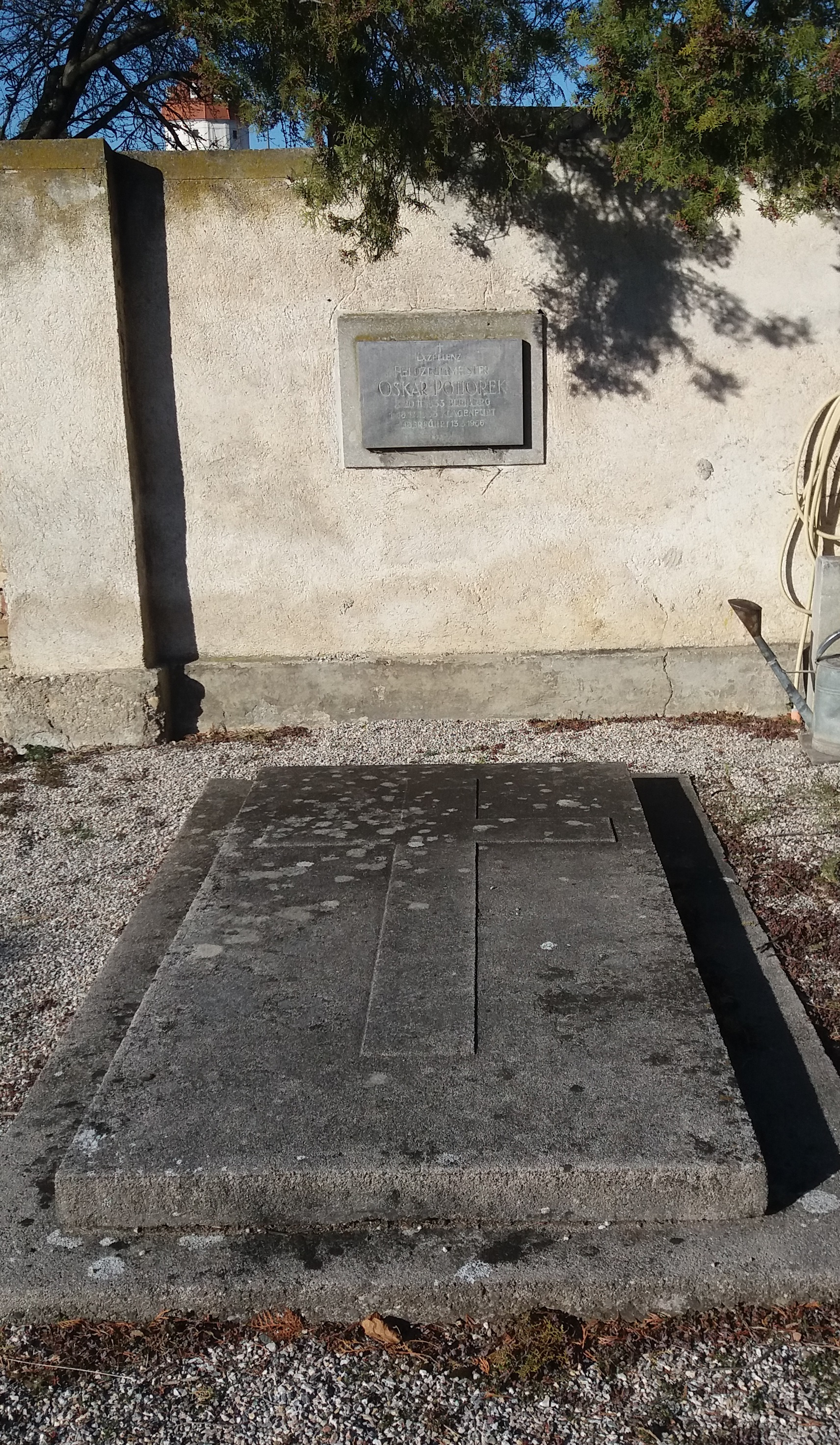
Potiorek's grave in Wiener Neustadt

Potiorek retired to Carinthian Klagenfurt, where he died in 1933. He is buried in the cemetery of the Theresian Military Academy in Wiener Neustadt.

== Honours ==
- Austria-Hungary:
  - Grand Cross of the Imperial Order of Leopold
  - Knight of the Iron Crown, 1st Class
  - Grand Cross of the Order of Franz Joseph
  - Commander of the Order of Saint Stephen of Hungary
- German Empire:
  - Knight of the Red Eagle, 1st Class in Diamonds
  - Knight of the Prussian Crown, 2nd Class with Star
  - Saxony: Knight of the Albert Order, 2nd Class
- Persian Empire: Order of the Lion and the Sun, 1st Class
- Spain: Grand Cross of Isabella the Catholic

Preceded by Marijan Varešanin	Governor of Bosnia and Herzegovina; May 10, 1911 - December 22, 1914	Succeeded by Stjepan Sarkotić
