= Royal Serbian Army =

Army of the Kingdom of Serbia, 1882–1918

- Војска Краљевине Србије
- Regimental standard
- Active: 1882–1918
- Country: Kingdom of Serbia
- Type: Army
- Role: Conventional warfare
- Size: 420,000
- Mottos: За веру, краља и отачаство Za veru, kralja i otačastvo "For Faith, King, and Fatherland"
- Engagements: Serbo-Bulgarian War (1885); First Balkan War (1912–1913); Ohrid–Debar uprising (1913); Second Balkan War (1913); World War I (1914–1918)

Commanders
- Notable commanders: Radomir Putnik; Petar Bojović; Stepa Stepanović; Živojin Mišić; Pavle Jurišić Šturm

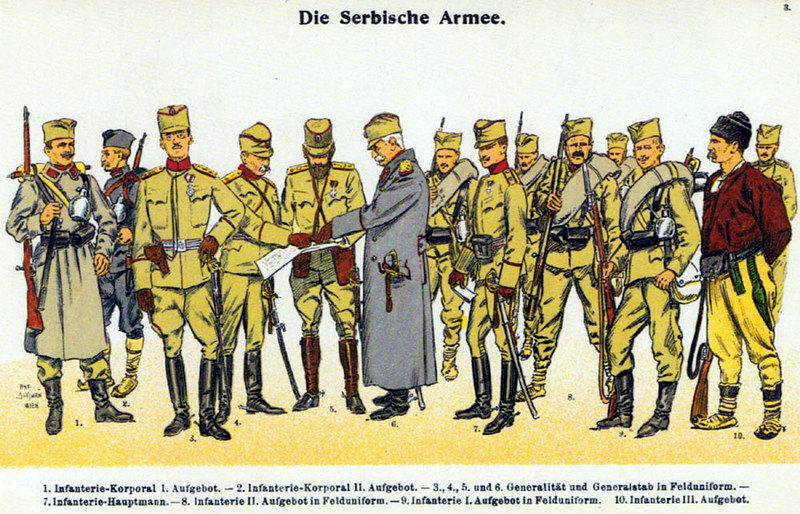
Field uniforms of the Royal Serbian Army, 1914.

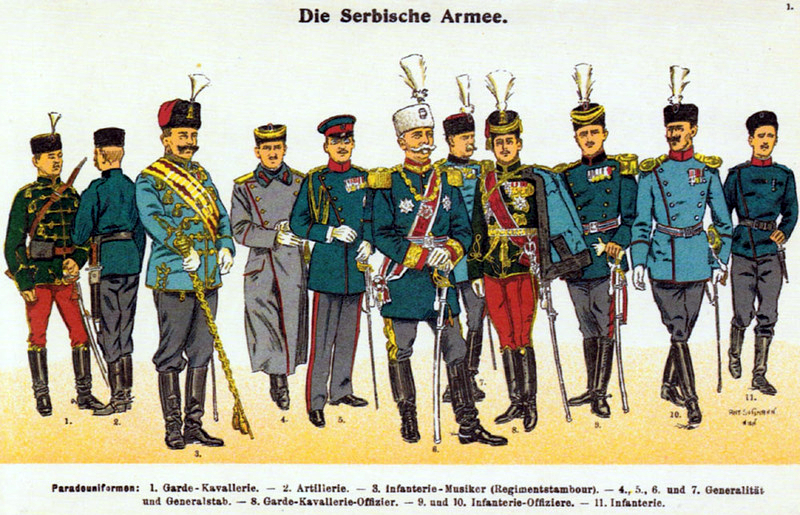
Parade uniforms of the Royal Serbian Army, 1914.

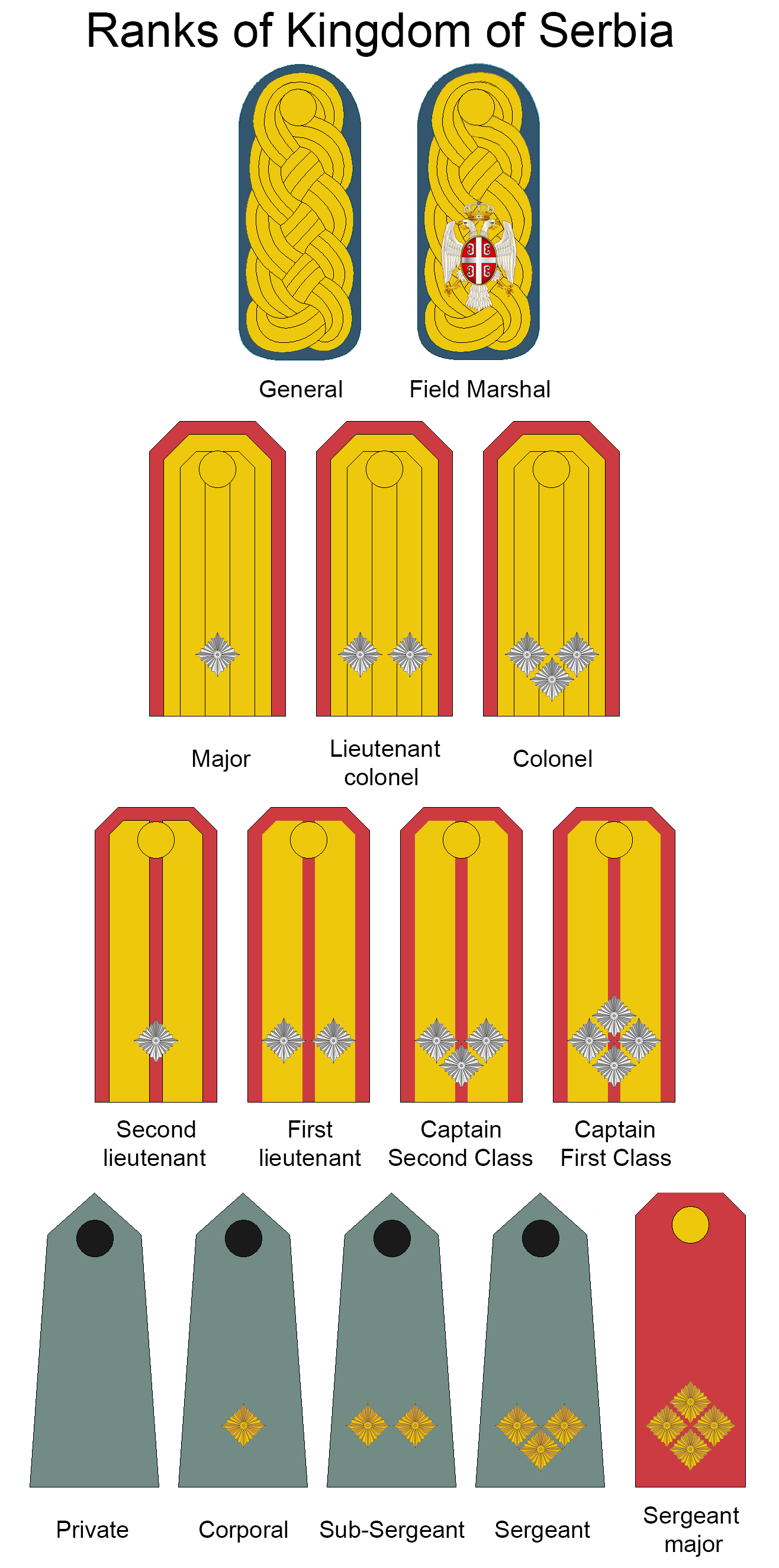
Military ranks of the Royal Serbian Army.

The Army of the Kingdom of Serbia (Serbian Cyrillic: Војска Краљевине Србије, romanized: Vojska Kraljevine Srbije), known in English as the Royal Serbian Army, was the army of the Kingdom of Serbia that existed between 1882 and 1918, succeeding the Armed Forces of the Principality of Serbia and preceding the Royal Yugoslav Army.

== Organization ==
=== Field armies ===
- First Army (Serbia)
- Second Army (Serbia)
- Third Army (Serbia)
- Timok Army
- Užice Army

=== Orders of battle ===
- Order of battle of the Serbian Army in the First Balkan War
- Order of battle of the Serbian Army in World War I

== Wars ==
Conflict	Allies	Adversaries	Results
Serbo-Bulgarian War (1885)	Austria-Hungary (support)	Bulgaria	Defeat: Treaty of Bucharest (1886), return to situation before the war; Recognition of the unification of Eastern Rumelia with Bulgaria.
First Balkan War (1912–1913)	Bulgaria; Greece; Montenegro (Kingdom of Italy) Italy (volunteers) (Albania) Albanians (volunteers) (Armenia) Armenians (volunteers); Russia (support)	Ottoman Empire; Circassians (Albania) Albanians (volunteers and irregulars); Austria-Hungary (support)	Victory: Treaty of London; Outbreak of the Second Balkan War.
Ohrid-Debar Uprising (1913)	Greece	IMRO; Kachaks	Victory: Suppression of uprising
Second Balkan War (1913)	Romania; Greece; Montenegro Ottoman Empire	Bulgaria	Victory: Treaty of Bucharest (1913).
Balkans theatre (World War I) (1914–1918)	Montenegro; France (from 1915); United Kingdom (from 1915); Greece (from 1917); Italy (from 1915); Russia (1916-1917)	Austria-Hungary; Bulgaria (from 1915); Germany (from 1915); Ottoman Empire (1916–1917)	Victory: Serbia regained its territory in 1918, occupied since 1915.; Proclamation of Podgorica Assembly in Montenegro of unification with Serbia; Unification of Slavic inhabited lands of Austria-Hungary with Serbia to form Yugoslavia; Treaty of Neuilly

== Military equipment ==
=== Armament ===
Weapon	In use	Notes
Rifles
Mauser-Koka	1881–1907+	110,000 units. Known as kokinka (pl. kokinke). Upgraded Mauser Model 1871.
Mauser-Koka 1884	1884–1918	4,000 units. Upgraded M71/84.
Mauser M1890	1912–1918	
Mauser M1893 and Mauser Model 1903	1912–1918	
Mauser M1899, M1899/07 and M1899/08	1899–1918	
Mauser-Koka-Đurić	1907–18	Upgraded Mauser-Koka.
Mauser Model 1910	1910–1918	
Berdan #1 and #2	1890–1918	75,000 units. Known as berdanka (pl. berdanci, berdanke).
Mauser Model 1889	1907–1918	known as belgijanka (pl. belgijanke)
Berthier M1907/15	1915–18	
Gras M1874	1880–1918	
Lebel M1886	1916–1918	
Mosin–Nagant M1891	1914–1918	
Machine guns
Chauchat	1916–1918	3,838 units.
Lewis	1915–1918	
Maxim	1897–1918	2,500 units.
MG 08	1911–1918	
Schwarzlose	1914–1918	
Handguns
Chamelot-Delvigne M1873 and M1874	1887–1918	
Gasser M1870	1883–1918	
Nagant M1895	1896–1918	
Ruby M1914	1916–1918	
Grenades
Vasić M12	1904–1918	

== Uniform ==
- Šajkača

== See also ==
- First Serbian Volunteer Division
- Serbian Chetnik Organization
- Serbian Armed Forces

== Sources ==
=== Books ===
- W. H. Crawfurd Price (1918). Serbia's Part in the War ... Simpkin, Marshall, Hamilton, Kent & Company. ( Public domain)
- Milićević, Milić; Popović, Ljubodrag (2003). Генерали војске Кнежевине и Краљевине Србије. Vojnoizdavački zavod.
- Vasić, Pavle (1980). Uniforme srpske vojske: 1808-1918. Jugoslavija.
- Milkić, Miljan (2003). "Специфичности верског живота у војсци Кнежевине–Краљевине Србије". Војно дело.
- Rudić, Srđan; Milkić, Miljan (2013). Balkanski ratovi 1912-1913: Nova viđenja i tumačenja [The Balkan Wars 1912/1913: New Viеws and Interpretations]. Istorijski institut & Institut za strategijska istrazivanja. ISBN 978-86-7743-103-7.

=== Journals ===
- Mijalkovski, Milan. "Četničke (gerilske) jedinice Kraljevine Srbije–borci protiv terora turskog okupatora." Zbornik radova Instituta za savremenu istoriju 09 (2007): 59–81.
- Becić, Ivan M. "Ratni dugovi Kraljevine Srbije u svetlu politike." Istorija 20. veka 3 (2010): 45–56.
- Gavrilović, Dejan V. Fizičko vežbanje i vojska Kraljevine Srbije. Diss. Univerzitet u Beogradu-Fakultet sporta i fizičkog vaspitanja, 2016.
- Đorđević, Branislav D. "Training of the Serbian Army." Vojno delo 51.5-6 (1999): 149–165.
- Denda, Dalibor. "Српска војска у предвечерје епохе ратова 1912–1920." Zbornik radova Instituta za savremenu istoriju 12 (2014): 423–436.
- Đukić, Slobodan. "Contribution of the Military Academy to the development of military theory in Serbia in the second half of the 19th century and the first decade of the 20th century." Vojno delo 67.5 (2015): 401–425.
- Mladenović, Božica. "Vojska Kraljevine Srbije za vreme Balkanskih ratova u ogledalu nemačke štampe." Baština 22 (2007): 161–171.
- Barović, Vladimir. "Voluntary participation in the armed forces of the Kingdom of Serbia as a possible model of professionalization of the armed forces of the Republic of Serbia." Vojno delo 62.2 (2010): 348–360.
- Ivetić, Vladimir. Politička uloga ministara vojnih Kraljevine Srbije od 1903. do 1914. godine. Diss. University of Belgrade, Faculty of Political Sciences, 2013.

=== Symposia ===
- Ratković–Kostić, Slavica (2010). "Vojska Kraljevine Srbije 1916. i 1917. godine. Organizacija i formacija" [Armed forces of the Serbian Kingdom 1916 and 1917. Organization and formation]. Prvi svetski rat i Balkan–90 godina kasnije, Tematski zbornik radova. Institut za strategijska istraživanja [First World War and the Balkans–90 years after, Collections of papers, Strategic Research Institute]. Belgrade: 101–117.
