= First Army (Serbia) =

Serbian First Army Српска Прва Армија
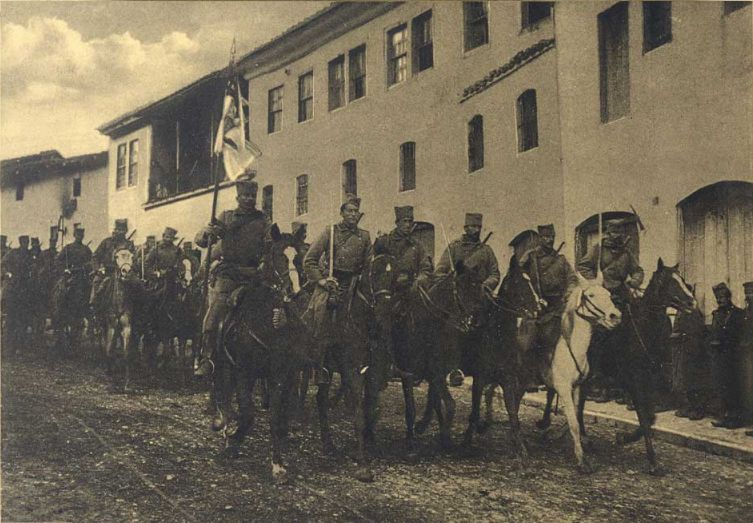
- The First Army's cavalry in Skopje
- Active: 1912–1919
- Country: Kingdom of Serbia
- Branch: Royal Serbian Army
- Type: Field Army
- Role: Conventional warfare
- Size: 132,000 in 1912; 3 divisions & 1 detachment
- Engagements: First Balkan War; Second Balkan War; World War I

Commanders
- Commander: Gen. Petar Bojović
- Commander: Gen. Živojin Mišić

The Serbian First Army (Српска Прва Армија / Srpska Prva Armija) was a Serbian field army that fought during the Balkan Wars and World War I. The First Army was the largest in the Serbian Armed Forces. For some time, it was commanded by the heir to the throne, Alexander Karađorđević.

== Composition and order of battle ==
The numerical strength and unit composition of all Serbian armies varied greatly during the war not only because of the heavy casualties, but also because of the very flexibile strategy employed by the Serbian High command, with armies often trading regiments and even divisions if needed. Serbian unit organisation did not include brigades and corps. The regiments directly formed the divisions (mostly four), and divisions formed the armies.

=== First Balkan War ===
- First Army, under the command of Crown Prince Alexander Karađorđević, Chief-of-Staff Petar Bojović.
  - Cavalry Division, under Arsen Karađorđević.
  - Morava I, under Ilija Gojković.
  - Drina I, under Pavle Jurišić Šturm.
  - Dunav I, under Miloš Božanović.
  - Dunav II, under Mihailo Rašić.
  - Timok II, under Dragutin Milutinović.
  - Army Artillery.

=== Second Balkan War ===
- First Army.
  - Šumadija I.
  - Dunav I.
  - Dunav II.
  - Morava II.
  - Cavalry Division.

=== August 1914 ===
- First Army - staff in the village Rača
  - I Timok Infantry Division - Smederevska Palanka
  - II Timok Infantry Division - Rača (reserve)
  - II Morava Infantry Division
  - Branicevo detachment - Požarevac

== Balkan Wars ==
The First Army participated in the Balkan Wars (1912–1913).

== World War I ==
Following the Austro-Hungarian invasion of Serbia, the First Army was put under the command of General Petar Bojović. It acted as a strategic reserve in the area of Aranđelovac during the Battle of Cer, but most of its divisions were sent to support the Second and Third armies actively engaged in the battle. The army conducted a successful crossing of Sava and performed an offensive into Syrmia (then part of Austria-Hungary) but was recalled when Second invasion of Serbia (also known as the Battle of Drina) began. The army had the decisive role in the battle conducting a strong counterattack against the Austro- Hungarian 6th army. It was engaged in some of the fiercest fights of the whole Serbian theatre at Mackov kamen, which ended in a bloody stalemate. After a month-long period of trench warfare, in November 1914, the Austro-Hungarian Army began the third invasion of Serbia (also known as the Battle of Kolubara). During the defensive part of this battle this army was in the most difficult situation due to heavy casualties from the Battle of Drina and acute lack of artillery ammunition. It was at this point that general Živojin Mišić, who was previously the Aide of Commander in Chief of Serbian Army, (Vojvoda/Duke -equivalent of Field Marshal Radomir Putnik), was made commander of this army, as Bojović was wounded. He restored morale and discipline (which had started to waver) in the army, by insisting on a deeper withdrawal before the Austro-Hungarians, all the way to Gornji Milanovac.

In December 1914, after receiving a badly needed supply of 75mm artillery ammunition, the whole Serbian army launched a counterattack. The First Army played the decisive role in this having affected the breakthrough against the 16. corps of Austro-Hungarian 6th army. It subsequently pursued that army all the way to the Drina, while the other two armies were engaged in expulsing the Austro-Hungarian 5th army. After the battle, Mišić promoted to Vojvoda.

When the fourth, combined German, Austro-Hungarian, and Bulgarian invasion force attacked Serbia in 1915, the First Army was tasked with defence of the western border of Serbia (along the river Drina). It faced mostly units of Austro-Hungarian Third Army and was mostly under less pressure then other Serbian units facing Germans or Bulgarians. Perhaps as a consequence of this Mišić was in favor of halting and making a final stand against the Central Powers forces when the High Command ordered retreat across Montenegro and Albania to Italian-held Durrës and Vlorë (at the time Serbian Army was defending itself in Kosovo from three sides and was in danger of becoming surrounded). However, he was overruled by other army commanders at their meetings at Peć, who decided to carry on the order of High Command.

The First Army took part in the epic retreat of the Serbian Army through the Albanian mountains during the winter of 1915 and 1916, during which it suffered heavy casualties due to hunger, frostbite, attack from Albanian bands (Albania officially supported the Entente) and exhaustion. From the Italian-held ports the Serbian Army was transported by Allied ships to Corfu, and a smaller part to French-held Bizerte to recuperate and reorganise. During the retreat of the Serbian army (along with civilians) a few Serbian soldiers would be assigned to "guard" large groups of civilians of 300 to 500 persons.

Mišić was recalled to command the First Army in September 1916 initially at Monastir and then at Thessaloniki. The First Army (again commanded by Bojović) took part in the Allied Vardar Offensive of 1918 that effectively knocked Bulgaria out of the war. During this offensive, this army advanced far ahead of the Allies and performed a maneuver near Niš which broke the last serious German attempt to halt the offensive by superior numbers. For his merit in this feat, Gen. Bojović was promoted to Vojvoda. This army liberated Belgrade, and subsequently crossed into Vojvodina and advanced as far as present-day border between Serbia and Hungary by the time of the Armistice.

== Commanders ==
- Alexander Karađorđević (1912–1913)
- Petar Bojović (August 1914 - September 1914)
- Živojin Mišić (October 1914 - December 1915)
- Miloš Vasić (acting) (January 1916 - April 1916)
- Živojin Mišić (April 1916 - 1917)
- Miloš Vasić (acting) (? 1917 - April 1917)
- Živojin Mišić (April 1917 - June 1918)
- Petar Bojović (June 1918 - 1919)

== See also ==
- Second Army (Serbia)
- Third Army (Serbia)

== Sources ==
- Rudić, Srđan; Milkić, Miljan (2013). Balkanski ratovi 1912-1913: Nova viđenja i tumačenja [The Balkan Wars 1912/1913: New Viеws and Interpretations]. Istorijski institut & Institut za strategijska istrazivanja. ISBN 978-86-7743-103-7.
- Jowett, Philipp S. (2011). Armies of the Balkan wars 1912—1913. Oxford: Osprey Publishing. ISBN 978-1-84908-418-5.
