= Battle of Cer =

Battle fought between Austria-Hungary and Serbia in August 1914

- Part of the Serbian campaign of the Balkans theatre of World War I
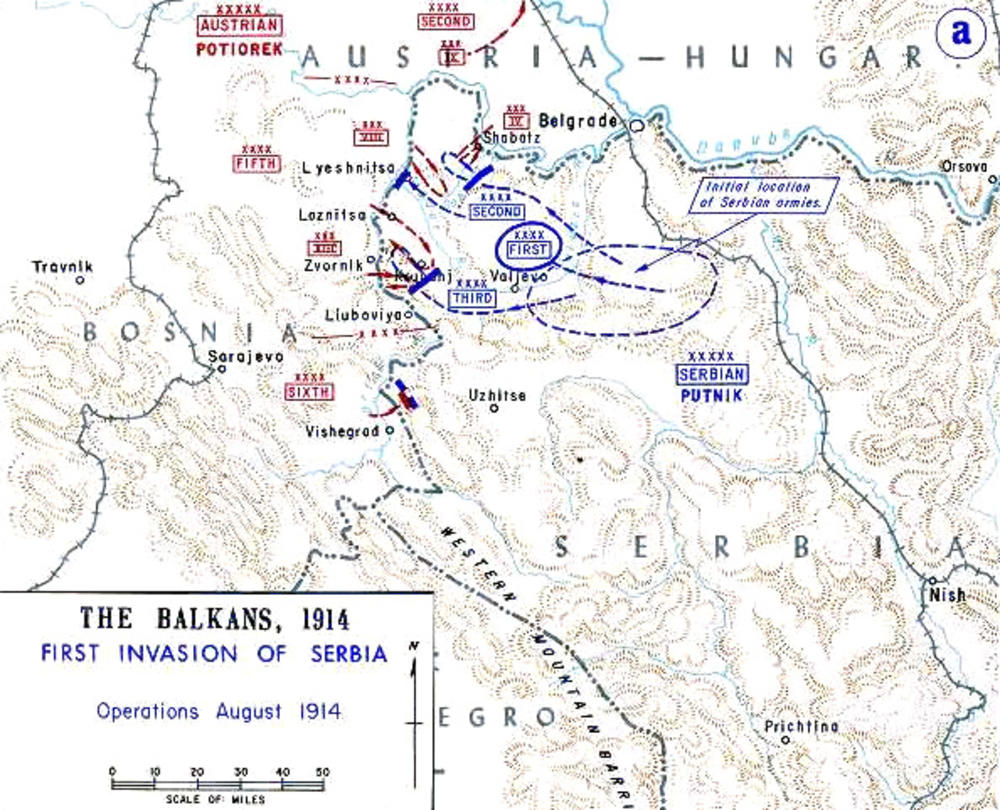
- Map of Austro-Hungarian and Serbian troop movements, August 1914
Date	15–24 August 1914 (Note: This range reflects the full course of operations around Cer Mountain. See: Neiberg (16–23 Aug), Mitrović (16–20 Aug), Glenny (15–18 Aug).)
Location	Cer Mountain and surrounding areas, northwestern Kingdom of Serbia 44°33′16″N 19°31′41″E
Result	Serbian victory

Belligerents
Kingdom of Serbia	Austria-Hungary

Commanders and leaders
Radomir Putnik; Stepa Stepanović; Pavle Šturm	Oskar Potiorek; Eduard Ermolli; Liborius Frank

Units involved
2nd Army; 3rd Army	2nd Army; 5th Army

Strength
180,000	200,000

Casualties and losses
Total: 18,000–20,000; 3,000–5,000 killed 15,000 wounded	Total: 40,500–44,500; 6,000–10,000 killed 30,000 wounded 4,500 captured
- Battle site on a map of modern Serbia Battle site on a map of the Balkans

The Battle of Cer (Note: Serbian: Церска битка, Cerska bitka; German: Schlacht von Cer; Hungarian: Ceri csata. Also known as the Battle of the Jadar River (Јадарска битка, Jadarska bitka; Schlacht von Jadar; Jadar csata).) was a military campaign fought between Austria-Hungary and Serbia in August 1914, starting three weeks into the Serbian Campaign of 1914, the initial military action of the First World War. It took place around Cer Mountain and several surrounding villages, as well as the town of Šabac.

The battle, part of the first Austro-Hungarian invasion of Serbia, began on the night of 15 August when elements of the Serbian 1st Combined Division encountered Austro-Hungarian outposts that had been established on the slopes of Cer Mountain earlier in the invasion. The clashes that followed escalated into a battle for control over several towns and villages near the mountain, especially Šabac. On 19 August, the morale of the Austro-Hungarians collapsed and thousands of soldiers retreated into Austria-Hungary with many of them drowning in the Drina River as they fled in panic. On 24 August the Serbs re-entered Šabac, marking the end of the battle.

Serbian casualties after nearly ten days of fighting were 3,000–5,000 killed and 15,000 wounded. Those of the Austro-Hungarians were significantly higher, with 6,000–10,000 soldiers killed, 30,000 wounded and 4,500 taken as prisoners of war. The Serbian victory over the Austro-Hungarians marked the first Allied victory over the Central Powers in the First World War, and the first aerial dogfight of the war took place during the battle.

== Background ==
Relations between Austria-Hungary and Serbia deteriorated in the aftermath of the Serbian May Coup that overthrew and assassinated the pro-Austrian King Alexander I and his wife in 1903. Almost immediately, the new Karađorđević government under King Peter I aligned itself with the Russian Empire and oriented its foreign policy away from its long-time patron, long-time use of Habsburgs, and Austria-Hungary. In 1906, Austria-Hungary closed its border to Serbian agricultural exports in an episode known as the Pig War. In 1908, Austria-Hungary formally annexed Bosnia-Herzegovina—a territory with a large Serb population that it had been granted the right to govern, supposedly as a temporary measure, by the Congress of Berlin in 1878. The annexation prompted the Serbian public to call for war with Austria-Hungary. With no promise of Russian support in the event of war, the Serbian government decided against pursuing the matter militarily. Count Franz Conrad von Hötzendorf boasted that it would take Austro-Hungary only three months to defeat Serbia should war erupt between the two nations.

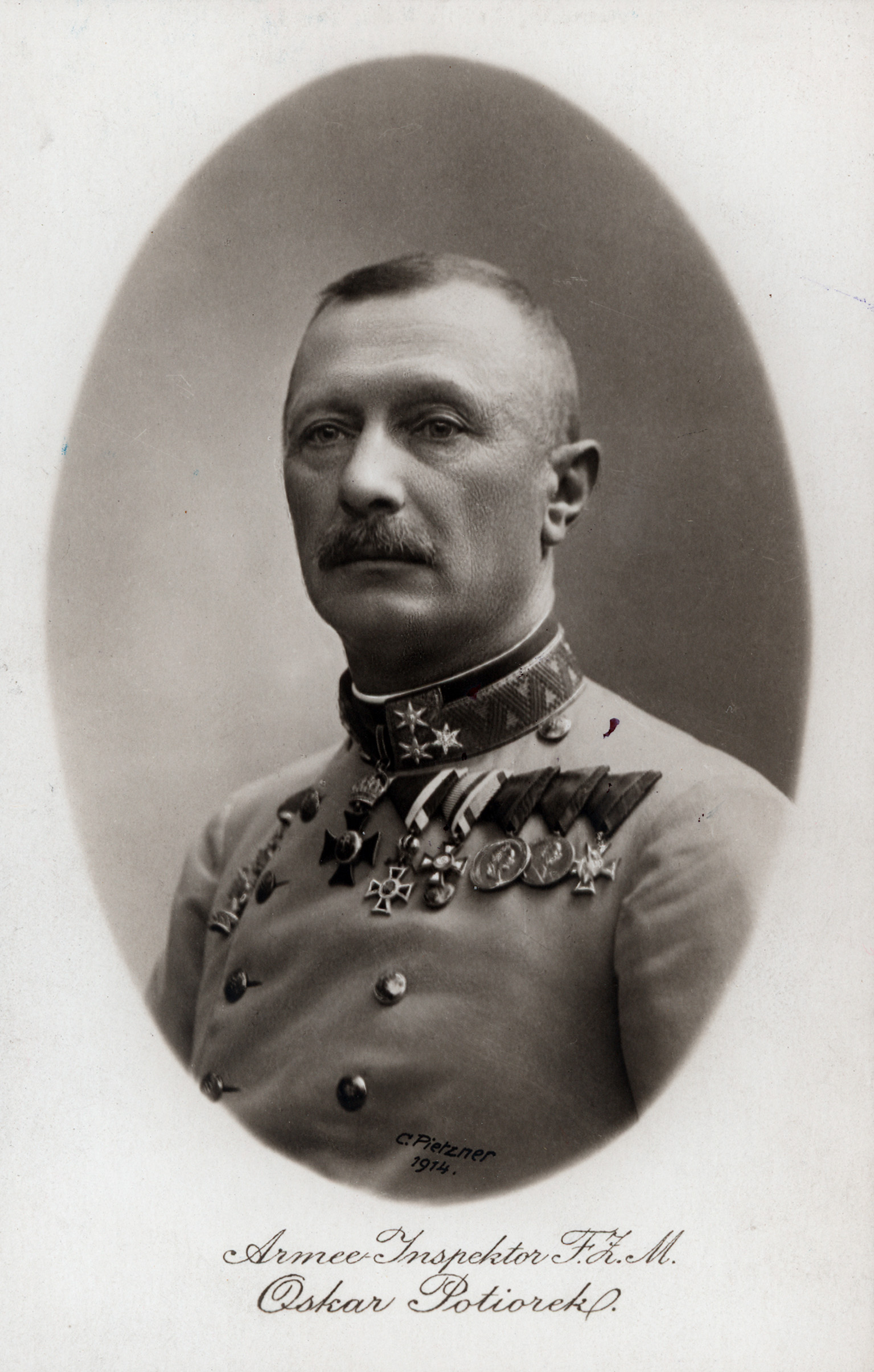
The Austro-Hungarian invasion of Serbia was commanded by General Oskar Potiorek, the Austro-Hungarian Governor of Bosnia and Herzegovina

With Bosnia-Herzegovina firmly in Austro-Hungarian hands, Serbia and several other Balkan states turned to force the Ottoman Empire from southeastern Europe. The ensuing Balkan Wars, which lasted from 1912 until 1913, saw Serbia take possession of Kosovo and Macedonia. On 28 June 1914, a Bosnian Serb student named Gavrilo Princip assassinated Archduke Franz Ferdinand of Austria in Sarajevo. The assassination precipitated the July Crisis, which led Austria-Hungary to issue an ultimatum to Serbia on 23 July on suspicion that the assassination had been planned in Belgrade. The Austro-Hungarian government made the ultimatum intentionally unacceptable to Serbia, and it was indeed rejected. The Austro-Hungarians declared war on Serbia on 28 July and that same day the Serbs destroyed all bridges on the Sava and Danube rivers in order to prevent Austria-Hungary from using them during any future invasion. Belgrade was shelled the following day, marking the beginning of the First World War.

Fighting in Eastern Europe began with the first Austro-Hungarian invasion of Serbia in early August 1914. The number of Austro-Hungarian troops was far smaller than the 308,000-strong force intended when war was declared. This was because a large portion of the Austro-Hungarian 2nd Army had moved to the Russian Front, reducing the number of troops involved in the initial stages of the invasion to approximately 200,000. Forty percent of this force was composed of South Slavs living within Austro-Hungarian borders. On the other hand, the Serbs could muster some 450,000 men to oppose the Austro-Hungarians upon full mobilization. The main elements to face the Austro-Hungarians were the 1st, 2nd, 3rd and Užice Armies, with a combined strength of approximately 180,000 men. The Balkan Wars had only just concluded and Serbia was still recovering. Over 36,000 Serbian soldiers had been killed and 55,000 seriously wounded. Few recruits had been gained from the newly acquired territories, and the Serbian army had been stretched by the need to garrison them against Albanian insurgents and the threat of Bulgarian attack. To compound matters, the Serbian army was dangerously short of artillery and had only just begun to replenish its ammunition stocks. Its supply problems also extended to more basic items. Many Serbian recruits reported for duty barefoot, and many units lacked any uniform other than a standard issue greatcoat and a traditional Serbian cap known as a šajkača. Rifles were also in critically short supply. It was estimated that full mobilization would see some 50,000 Serbian soldiers with no equipment at all. The Austro-Hungarians, on the other hand, possessed an abundance of modern rifles and had twice as many machine guns and field guns as the Serbs. They also had better stocks of munitions, as well as much better transport and industrial infrastructure behind them. The Serbs had a slight advantage over the Austro-Hungarians: many of their soldiers were experienced veterans of the Balkan Wars and better trained than their Austro-Hungarian counterparts. Serb soldiers were also highly motivated, which compensated in part for their lack of weaponry.

Austro-Hungarian forces assigned to the invasion were placed under the command of General Oskar Potiorek, who had been responsible for the security detail of Archduke Franz Ferdinand in Sarajevo. Before the battle, Potiorek had predicted an easy victory over the Serbians, calling them "pig farmers." The Royal Serbian Army was commanded by Crown Prince Regent Alexander, with the Chief of the General Staff, Field Marshal Radomir Putnik, who had commanded Serb forces in the Balkan Wars, as his deputy and de facto military leader. Generals Petar Bojović, Stepa Stepanović and Pavle Jurišić Šturm commanded the 1st, 2nd and 3rd Serbian Armies, respectively.

== Battle ==
=== Prelude ===
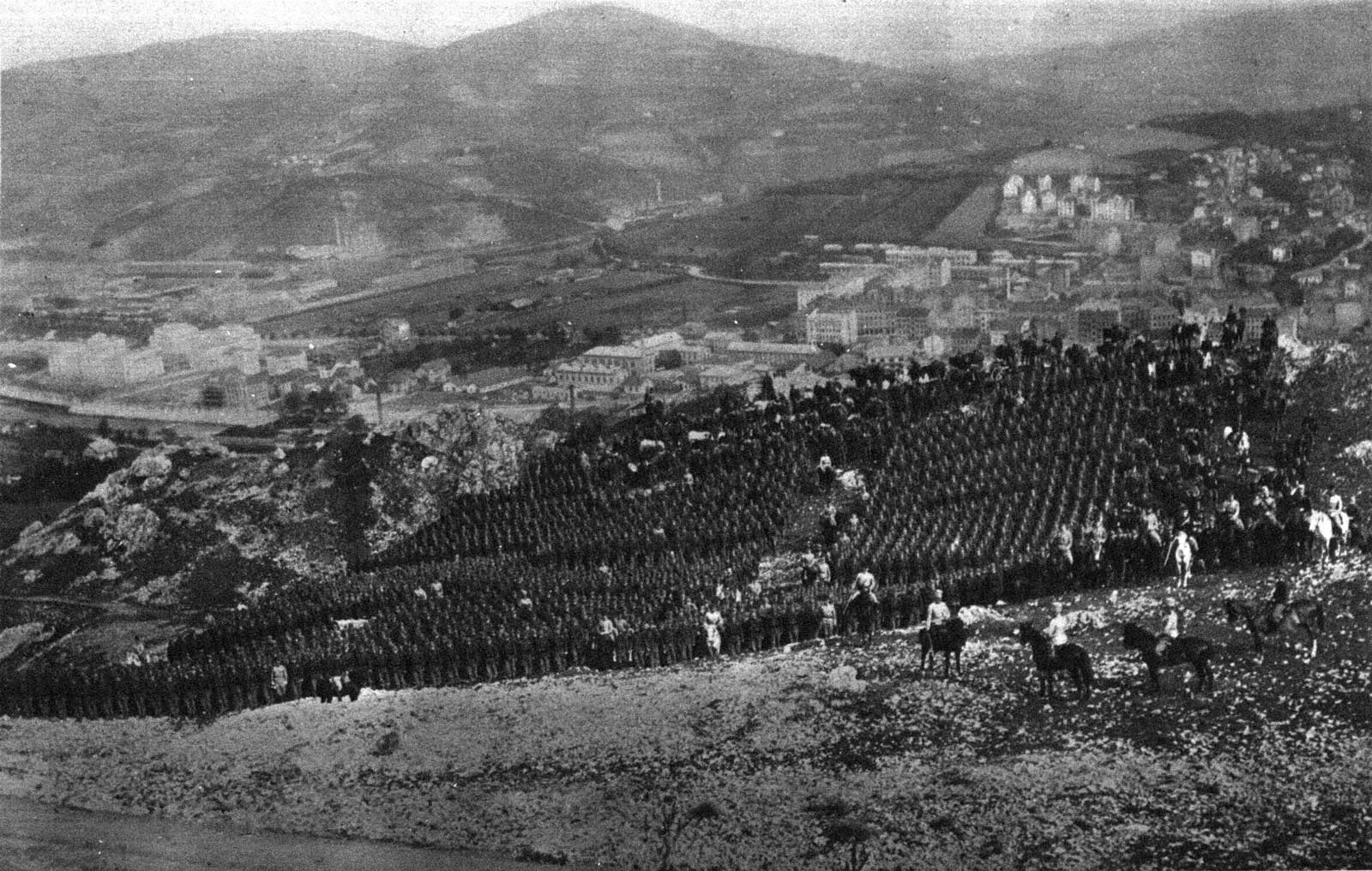
Mobilized Austro-Hungarian troops sent across Sarajevo for Serbia

From 29 July to 11 August, the Austro-Hungarian army launched a series of artillery attacks in northern and northwestern Serbia and subsequently managed to exploit the bombardments by constructing a system of pontoon bridges across the Sava and Drina rivers. The Serbians knew that it was impossible for their forces to line the Austro–Serbian border, which extended 340 miles (550 km). Putnik thereby re-ordered the Serbian army to fall back on a traditional line of defence as he grouped the bulk of his forces in Šumadija, from where they could rapidly move either north or west. Strong detachments were posted in the towns of Valjevo and Užice, and outposts were stationed at every important point on the frontier. At this stage, all the Serbian General Staff could do was wait until the Austro-Hungarian invasion plan materialized.

Belgrade, Smederevo and Veliko Gradište continued to be subjected to more vigorous artillery bombardments, and several attempts to cross the Danube resulted in heavy Austro-Hungarian losses. The bulk of the Austro-Hungarian forces were stationed in Bosnia, and the Serbian General Staff were not misled by these feints on the Danube. Subsequently, the Austro-Hungarians attempted to cross the Drina at Ljubovija and the Sava at Šabac, and these attacks were seen as more significant. On 12 August, Austro-Hungarian troops entered Serbia through the town of Loznica, crossing the Drina. There, and in the village of Lešnica, the Austro-Hungarian 13th Army Corps made a crossing, while on the same day the Austro-Hungarian 4th Army Corps crossed the Sava to the north of Šabac, while other Austro-Hungarian troops crossed the Drina. The town of Šabac was quickly taken. By 14 August, over a front of about 100 miles (160 km), the Austro-Hungarians had crossed the rivers and converged on Valjevo. The Austro-Hungarian 2nd and 5th Armies moved towards Belgrade, where they encountered the Serbian 1st, 2nd and 3rd Armies. On 15 August, Putnik ordered his forces to counterattack.

=== Combat ===
The forward battalion had advanced during the night towards the Trojan peak, and when we made it to Parlog the shower began, followed by volcanic thunder and sheet lightning. Water was drenching us from all sides ... Suddenly another soldier, out of breath and excited, screamed:
"Major, sir, the Krauts!"
That's how the night-time clash between our Combined Division and the enemy's 21st Landwehr Division started and with it the battle of Cer Mountain.

— Captain Ješa Topalović, of the Serbian army, recounting how his division encountered Austro-Hungarian forces on the slopes of Cer Mountain.

Around 23:00 on 15 August, elements of the Serbian 1st Combined Division encountered outposts set up by the invading Austro-Hungarian army on the slopes of Cer Mountain and fighting erupted. The Austro-Hungarian positions were lightly held, and their defenders were driven back away from the mountain. By midnight, fierce clashes between the Austro-Hungarians and the Serbs were underway and chaos ensued in the darkness. By the morning of 16 August, the Serbians had seized the Divača Range and dislodged the Austro-Hungarians from their positions in the village of Borino Selo. The Austro-Hungarians, who had suffered heavy casualties during the fighting, retreated in some disorder. As the day progressed, the Serbs drove the 21st Infantry Division off the slopes of Cer to prevent it from linking with the 2nd Army in Šabac.

On 17 August, the Serbs attempted to retake Šabac, but their efforts failed. The 1st Combined Division attacked the villages of Trojan and Parlog before moving on toward the small town of Kosanin Grad. Elsewhere, the Austro-Hungarians succeeded in repulsing the Serbian 3rd Army, forcing it to manoeuvre one of its divisions to protect the approach to the town of Valjevo, which was threatened by the 42nd Home Guard Infantry Division.

In the early morning of 18 August, the Austro-Hungarians launched another attack, with the intention of pushing the 1st Šumadija Division off the Šabac bridgehead to allow the 5th Army to advance. However, the attack failed as the Serbs defeated the Austro-Hungarians at the Dobrava River, forcing their surviving soldiers to withdraw. Elsewhere, the Serbian 2nd Army's counter-offensive continued along the Cer and Iverak, with the 1st Combined Division attacking the village of Rašulijača and coming under severe pressure at Kosanin Grad. The first Serbian assault was fought off, but a wave of further attacks followed throughout the night. In the early morning of 19 August, the Serbs finally defeated the Austro-Hungarians and seized the small town. The 1st Morava Division drove the 9th Infantry Division from its position and fought off the division's subsequent counterattack, inflicting heavy losses. The 4th Corps renewed its attack against the Šumadija Division, forcing the Serbs to withdraw having only sustained light casualties. Because the 4th Corps did not break the Serbs, the Austro-Hungarian division was unable to alter the direction of its advance towards Cer Mountain, since doing so would have put the Šumadija Division in a position to attack the 4th Corps from the rear. As a result, the 4th Corps was unable to join other Austro-Hungarian forces fighting at Cer.

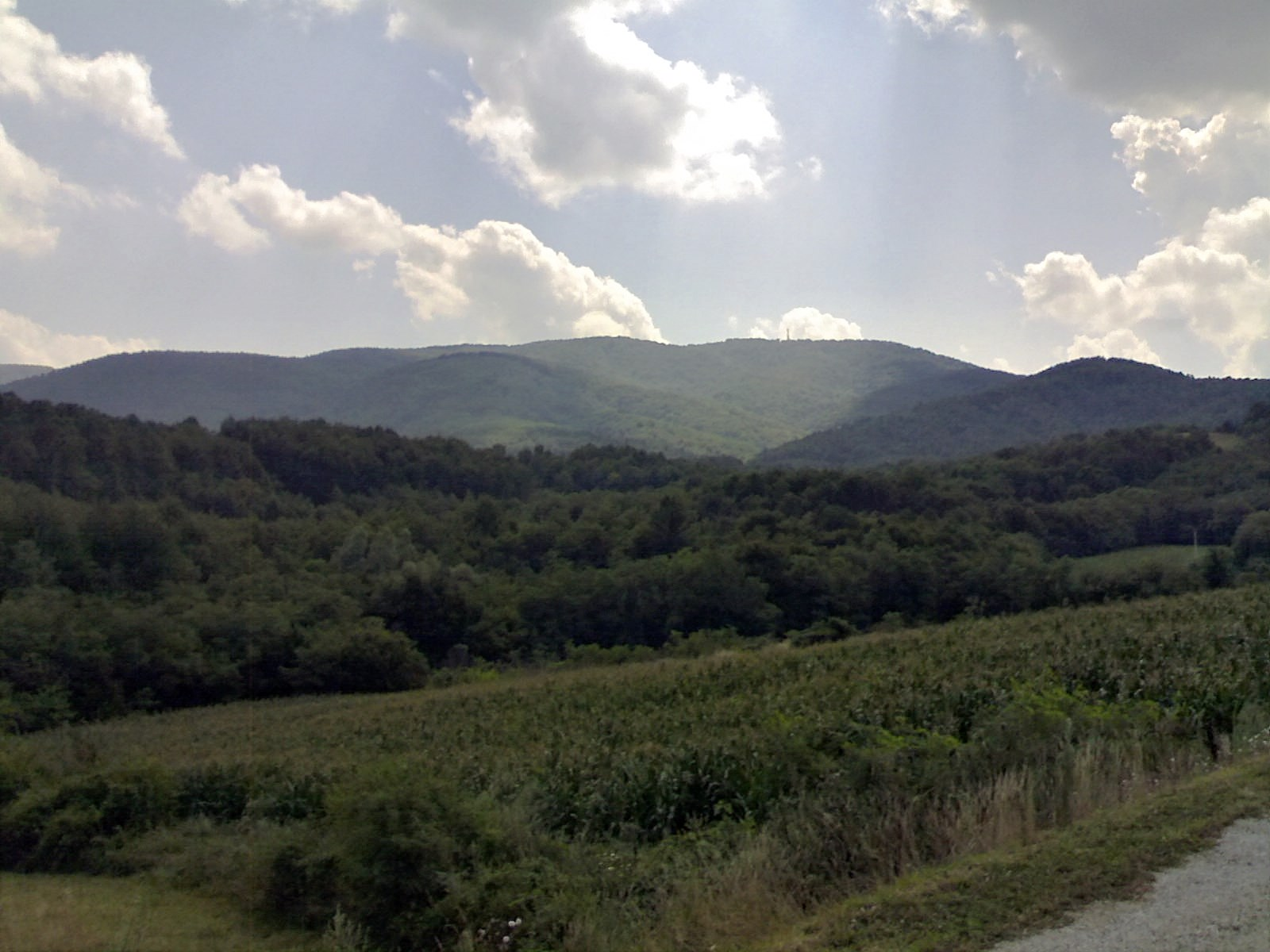
Cer Mountain, northwestern Serbia. In 1914, the mountain was the site of the eponymous battle in which Austro-Hungarian forces were defeated by their numerically-inferior Serb opponents.

The Serbs retook Rašulijača at noon, and the 1st Combined Division exploited this to advance towards Lešnica. Meanwhile, the 1st Morava Division attacked Iverak and managed to drive the Austro-Hungarians back. The village of Velika Glava fell to the Serbs before midday, and by late afternoon, the Rajin Grob ridge had been retaken. At around this time, the Austro-Hungarians began retreating with increasing rapidity, their will and cohesion apparently shattered. The 3rd Army had similar success, routing the 36th Infantry Division and forcing it to retreat in considerable disorder. The Serbs then moved to pursue the fleeing Austro-Hungarians all along the front. By 20 August, Austro-Hungarian forces were fleeing across the Drina River, still being pursued by the Serbs back into Bosnia, with the entire 5th Army being forced across the Austro-Hungarian side of the river. Many Austro-Hungarian soldiers drowned in the water as they fled in panic. Serbian military reports announced that "the enemy is withdrawing in the greatest disorder." Putnik then notified King Peter I in a telegram, saying "The main enemy has been defeated in Jadar and on Mount Cer, and our troops are in hot pursuit." Upon their triumph at Cer Mountain, the Serbs sought to recapture the heavily fortified town of Šabac. Violent clashes occurred on 21 and 22 August, during which Serb forces fought their way to the western approaches of the town. By 23 August, the Serbs had encircled the town and that evening they brought up their siege artillery. On 24 August, Serbian forces entered Šabac and discovered that the Austro-Hungarians had decamped the previous night. By 16:00, the Serbs reached the banks of the Sava River, bringing the first Austro-Hungarian invasion of Serbia to an end.

== Casualties ==
Both sides suffered heavy casualties in the battles. Estimates of the number of Austro-Hungarian casualties vary. Jordan states that the Austro-Hungarians suffered a total of 37,000 casualties in the battle, of whom 7,000 were fatalities. Misha Glenny states that almost 30,000 Austro-Hungarian soldiers were wounded and 6,000–10,000 were killed. Horne writes that the Austro-Hungarians had 8,000 soldiers killed and 30,000 wounded in the battle, compounded by the loss of 46 guns, 30 machine guns and 140 ammunition wagons. Historian David Stevenson states that 4,500 Austro-Hungarian soldiers were taken prisoner.

Estimates of the number of Serbian casualties also vary. Horne and Jordan both agree that approximately 3,000 Serbian soldiers were killed and 15,000 were wounded in the battle. Glenny counters that 3,000–5,000 Serb soldiers were killed in the battle. Nevertheless, the number of fatalities suffered by both sides heralded the massive cost in human lives of the First World War. French journalist Henry Barby reported:

The area between Cer and the river Jadar where this tremendous battle took place was nothing but mass graves and putrefying flesh ... From the shadow of the woods emerged a stench so foul that it rendered the approach to the summit of Cer impossible. The number of corpses there was so enormous that the Second Army was constrained to abandon their burial due to a lack of time.

Atrocities were committed by both the Austro-Hungarians and Serbs, although, according to author Lawrence Sondhaus, the majority were committed by the Austro-Hungarians. The Austro-Hungarians charged Serb civilians with mutilating Austro-Hungarian soldiers, while undisciplined Austro-Hungarian troops summarily executed hundreds of Serb men and raped and murdered numerous women and children during the battle, which Sondhaus ascribes to their hatred towards Serbs for starting the war. Many of those murdered by the Austro-Hungarians were the victims of fellow South Slavs (Croats and Bosnian Muslims) serving in the Austro-Hungarian army. Serbian commanders noted that the Austro-Hungarians had committed numerous reprisal killings over the course of the battle. General Pavle Jurišić Šturm recounted:

The Austrian army has committed frightful atrocities in our territories. A group of nineteen (men, women and children) has been found by the Krivajica tavern. They had been roped together and then horribly massacred. Such a group of fifteen people was found in Zavlaka. Small groups of slaughtered and disfigured people, mostly women and children, are to be found throughout the villages. One woman had belts of skin cut off and another had had her breasts cut off ... Another group of twelve women and children has been found who had been tied together and massacred. Peasants say such sights are to be seen everywhere.

== Legacy ==
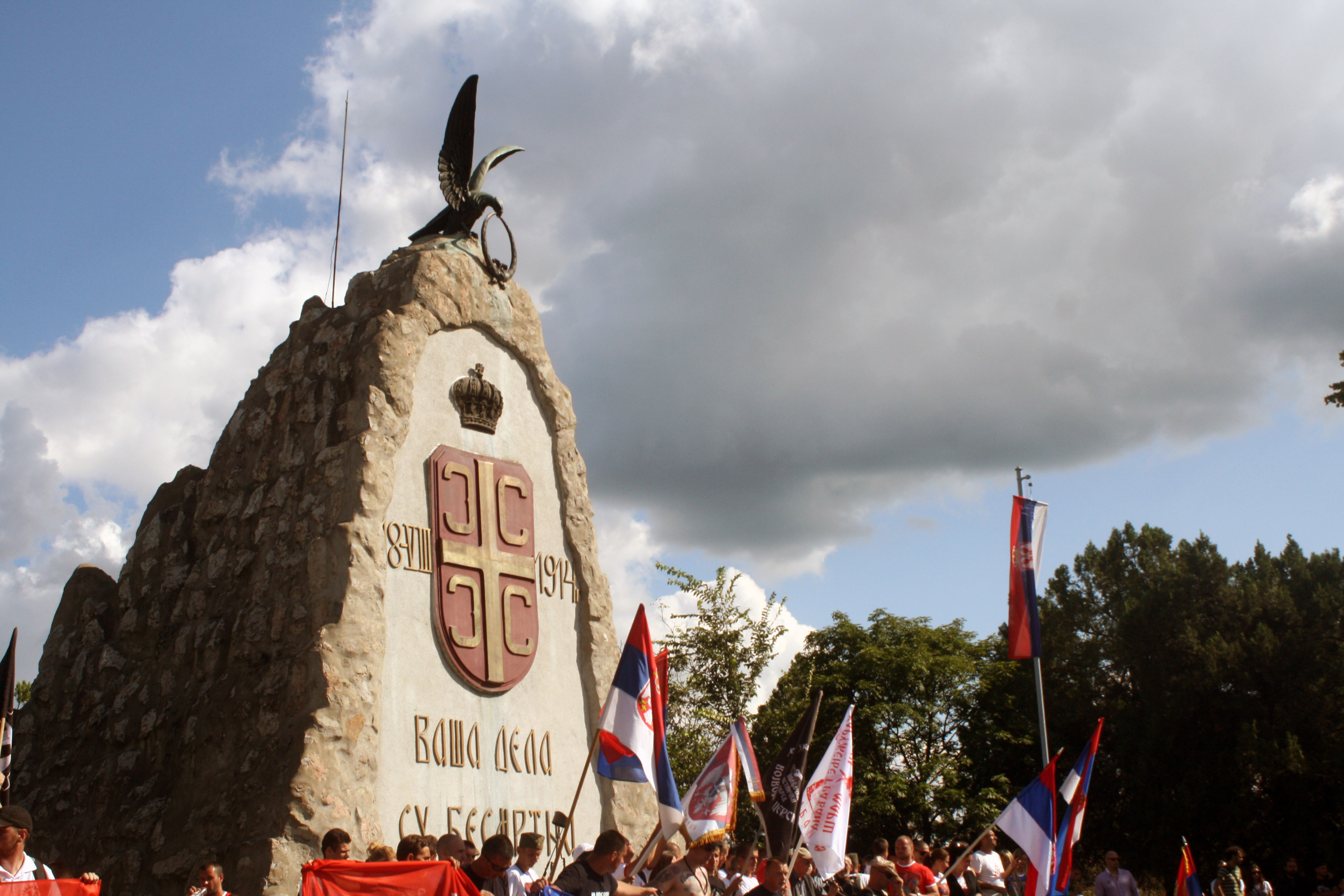
The Cer Memorial Ossuary during the 100th anniversary of the battle

Although they succeeded in repelling the Austro-Hungarian attack, the Serbs used up much of their ammunition during the battle, needing 6.5 million cartridges and 35,000 shells to prevail. The commander of the Serbian 2nd Army, General Stepa Stepanović, was promoted to the rank of field marshal (Serbian: војвода, vojvoda) for his successful command. In contrast, Austro-Hungarian commander Oskar Potiorek was humiliated in defeat and determined to launch a second invasion of Serbia. In September, he was given permission to launch such an invasion provided that he "not risk anything that might lead to a further fiasco." Defeat at Cer Mountain also affected the morale of the Austro-Hungarian troops. The first aerial dogfight of the war occurred during the battle, when Serbian aviator Miodrag Tomić encountered an Austro-Hungarian plane while performing a reconnaissance mission over enemy positions. The Austro-Hungarian pilot fired at Tomić with his revolver. Tomić managed to escape, and, within several weeks, all Serbian and Austro-Hungarian planes were fitted with machine guns.

The battle was the first Allied victory over the Central Powers in the First World War. Serbia's triumph on the battlefield drew worldwide attention to the country and won the Serbs sympathy from both neutral and Allied countries. A number of foreigners flocked to Serbia in late 1914, offering financial, political, humanitarian and military aid. Articles in defence of Serbia became more frequent in the British press. Certain cultural circles in Italy advocated entering the war on the Allied side, citing Serbian and Montenegrin battlefield successes.

The Serbian patriotic song "March on the Drina" was written by Serbian composer Stanislav Binički shortly after the battle to commemorate the victory. Binički dedicated the march to his favourite commander in the army, Colonel Milivoje Stojanović, who was killed during the fighting. A Yugoslav war film also titled March on the Drina was released in 1964 and is loosely based on the battle.

== See also ==
- Battle of Kolubara
- Battle of the Drina

== Sources ==
=== Books ===
- Bideleux, Robert; Jeffries, Ian (2007). The Balkans: A Post-Communist History. London: Routledge. ISBN 978-0-203-96911-3.
- Buttar, Prit (2014). Collision of Empires: The War on the Eastern Front in 1914. Oxford: Osprey Publishing. ISBN 978-1-78200-648-0.
- Ćirković, Sima (2004). The Serbs. Malden: Blackwell Publishing. ISBN 978-1405142915.
- Cox, John K. (2002). The History of Serbia. Westport, Connecticut: Greenwood Press. ISBN 978-0313312908.
- Dragnich, Alex N. (2004). Serbia Through the Ages. Boulder: East European Monographs. ISBN 978-0-88033-541-6.
- Fischer, Conan (2011). Europe between Democracy and Dictatorship: 1900–1945. New York City: John Wiley & Sons. ISBN 978-0-631-21511-0.
- Glenny, Misha (2012). The Balkans: 1804–2012. London: Granta Books. ISBN 978-1-77089-273-6.
- Griffiths, William R. (2003). The Great War. Garden City Park, New York: Square One Publishers. ISBN 978-0-7570-0158-1.
- Gumz, Jonathan E. (2009). The Resurrection and Collapse of Empire in Habsburg Serbia, 1914–1918. Cambridge: Cambridge University Press. ISBN 978-0521896276.
- Hall, Richard Cooper (2010). Balkan Breakthrough: The Battle of Dobro Pole 1918. Bloomington: Indiana University Press. ISBN 978-0-253-00411-6.
- Hickey, Michael (2002). The First World War: The Mediterranean Front 1914–1923. Oxford: Osprey Publishing. ISBN 978-1-84176-373-6.
- Horne, John; Kramer, Alan (2001). German Atrocities, 1914: A History of Denial. New Haven: Yale University Press. ISBN 978-0-300-10791-3.
- Horne, Charles F. (2005). The Great Events of the Great War: Part Two. Whitefish, Montana: Kessinger Publishing. ISBN 978-1-4191-3369-5.
- Jordan, David (2008). The Balkans, Italy & Africa 1914–1918: From Sarajevo to the Piave and Lake Tanganyika. London: Amber Books. ISBN 978-1-906626-14-3.
- Lyon, James B. (2015). Serbia and the Balkan Front, 1914: The Outbreak of the Great War. London: Bloomsbury. ISBN 978-1472580054.
- Mitrović, Andrej (2007). Serbia's Great War, 1914–1918. West Lafayette, Indiana: Purdue University Press. ISBN 978-1-55753-477-4.
- Mulligan, William (2010). The Origins of the First World War. Cambridge: Cambridge University Press. ISBN 978-0-521-88633-8.
- Neiberg, Michael S. (2006). Fighting the Great War: A Global History. Cambridge, Massachusetts: Harvard University Press. ISBN 978-0-674-04139-4.
- Palmer, Michael A. (2010). The German Wars: A Concise History, 1859–1945. Minneapolis, Minnesota: Zenith Imprint. ISBN 978-1-61673-985-0.
- Pavlowitch, Stevan K. (2002). Serbia: The History behind the Name. London: Hurst & Company. ISBN 978-1850654773.
- Radan, Peter; Pavković, Aleksandar (1997). The Serbs and Their Leaders in the Twentieth Century. Farnham, England: Ashgate. ISBN 978-1-85521-891-8.
- Sondhaus, Lawrence (2011). World War One: The Global Revolution. Cambridge: Cambridge University Press. ISBN 978-0-521-51648-8.
- Stevenson, David (2004). Cataclysm: The First World War as Political Tragedy. New York: Basic Books. ISBN 978-0-7867-3885-4.
- Strachan, Hew (2001). The First World War. Vol. 1. Oxford: Oxford University Press. ISBN 978-0-19-820877-8.
- Thomas, Nigel (2001). Armies in the Balkans: 1914–18. Oxford: Osprey Publishing. ISBN 978-1-78096-735-6.
- Tucker, Spencer C.; Roberts, Priscilla Mary (2005). The Encyclopedia of World War I: A Political, Social, and Military History. Santa Barbara, California: ABC-CLIO. ISBN 978-1-85109-420-2.

=== Websites ===
- "Marš na Drinu: Iz blata i kaljuge do prve pobede saveznika u Prvom svetskom ratu". B92 (in Serbian). 28 June 2011.
- "Marš na Drinu: Stanislav Binički komponovao je jedan od najlepših marševa". Glas javnosti (in Serbian). 3 March 2003. Archived from the original on 5 January 2013.
