= Miloš Vasić (general) =

Serbian general in WWI

General Miloš Vasić
- Милош Васић
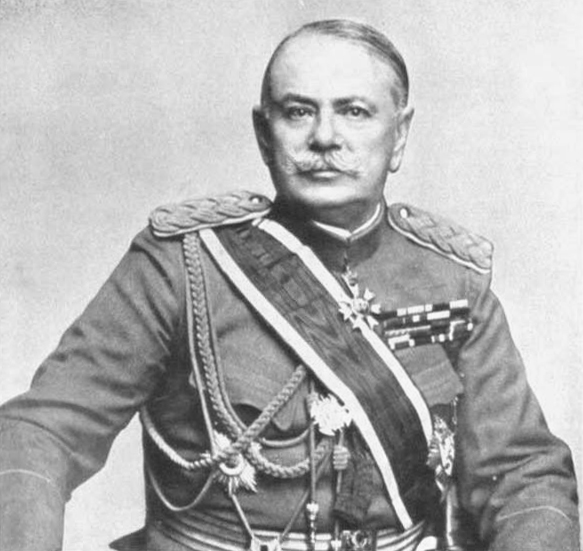
- Born: 27 February 1859; Nemenikuće near Belgrade, Principality of Serbia
- Died: 20 October 1935 (aged 76); Belgrade, Kingdom of Yugoslavia
- Burial place: Belgrade New Cemetery
- Military career
- Allegiance: Serbia; Yugoslavia
- Branch: Serbian Army; Royal Yugoslav Army
- Service years: 1880–1903; 1912–1913; 1914–1923
- Rank: Divisional General
- Conflicts: First Balkan War; Second Balkan War; World War I
- Awards: Order of the Star of Karađorđe

Miloš Vasić (Serbian Cyrillic: Милош Васић) (27 February 1859 – 20 October 1935) was a Serbian general who commanded the Serbian 3rd Army in World War I.

== Biography ==
Miloš Vasić fought as a volunteer in the Serbian–Ottoman War (1876–1878), and then studied at the military academy between 1880 and 1883. He fought as a Second lieutenant in the Serbo-Bulgarian War (1885). After the war, he held several functions at Army Headquarters. In 1897 he became military attaché in Bulgaria, and from July 1900 to April 1901 he was Minister of Defense of Serbia. During that time he created the military rank of Field Marshal which was new in Serbian army. After the May Coup in 1903, he retired from public life.

At the outbreak of the Balkan Wars (1912-1913), he was recalled to duty and became liaison officer with the Greek Army. In July 1914 he was appointed head of the Branicevski detachment and on 30 August 1914 of the Second Danube Division.

In the first months of 1916, when Živojin Mišić was hospitalized in France, he became temporary commander of the Serbian 1st Army, before returning to Greece as liaison officer. On 14 August 1916 he replaced Pavle Jurišić Šturm at the head of the Serbian 3rd Army, until it was disbanded on 28 March 1917. Following that he was sent as liaison officer to Italy, where he remained until the end of the War.

After the war, he was involved in the discussions with Italy about the Dalmatian Question and was again Minister of Defense between January and November 1922. General Miloš Vasić died in Belgrade on 20 October 1935. He is buried in the Alley of the Greats at Belgrade New Cemetery.

== Sources ==
- Bjelajac, Mile S. (2004). Generals and admirals of the Kingdom of Yugoslavia from 1918 to 1941. Institute for Recent History of Serbia. ISBN 86-7005-039-0.
- "Commemoration of the 82nd Anniversary of the Death of General Miloš Vasić". beogradskagroblja.com. 2017-10-20. Archived from the original on September 17, 2021.

Government offices
Preceded by Milivoje Petrović Blaznavac	Serbian Minister of Defence; 1900–1901	Succeeded by Božidar Janković
Preceded by Milivoje Zečević	Yugoslavian Minister of Defence; 1922	Succeeded by Petar Pešić
