= Petar Bojović =

Serbian field marshal

Vojvoda Petar Bojović
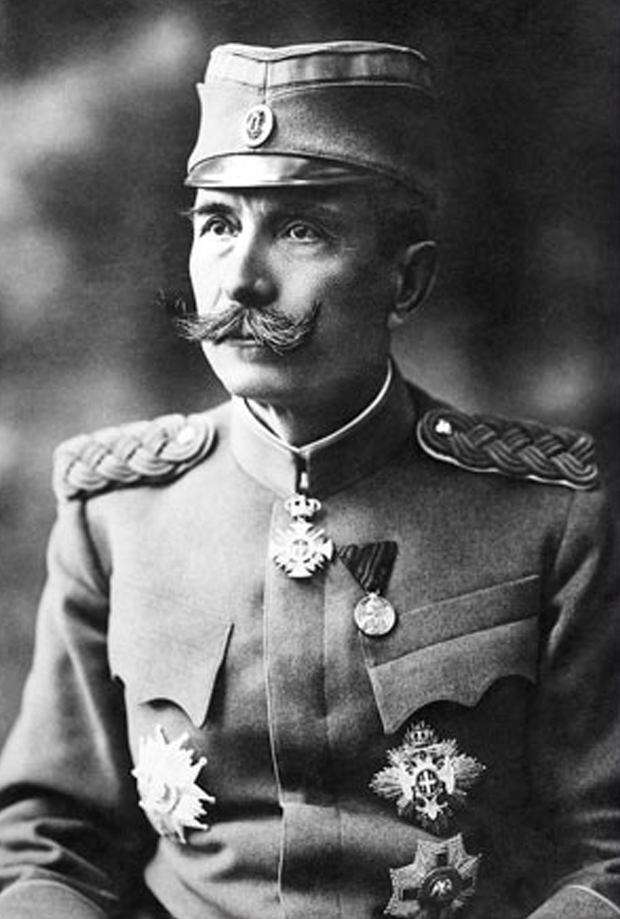
- Petar Bojović in 1918.

Deputy Commander in Chief of the Royal Yugoslav Armed Forces
- In office 3 April 1941 – 17 April 1941
- Monarch: Peter II
- Preceded by: Prince Paul
- Succeeded by: Dušan Simović

Chief of the General Staff of the Royal Yugoslav Armed Forces
- In office 21 January 1921 – 8 December 1921
- Monarchs: Peter I Alexander I
- Preceded by: Živojin Mišić
- Succeeded by: Petar Pešić

Chief of Staff of the Supreme Command of the Serbian Army
- In office 8 December 1915 – 1 July 1918
- Monarch: Peter I
- Preceded by: Radomir Putnik
- Succeeded by: Živojin Mišić

Chief of the Serbian General Staff
- In office 1906–1908
- Monarch: Peter I
- Preceded by: Aleksandar Mašin
- Succeeded by: Radomir Putnik

Personal details
- Born: 16 June 1858 Miševići, Nova Varoš, Ottoman Empire
- Died: 19 January 1945 (aged 86) Belgrade, DF Yugoslavia
- Resting place: Belgrade New Cemetery
- Spouse: Mileva Bojović (1893–1945; his death)
- Children: Božidar Bojović; Vojislav Bojović; Jelica Bojović; Dobrosav Bojović; Rada Bojović; Radoslav Bojović
- Education: Military Academy Serbia
- Profession: Army officer
- Awards: Order of the Star of Karageorge; Order of the Star of Karageorge with Swords; Order of the Yugoslav Crown; Order of Saints Maurice and Lazarus; Order of Saint Michael and Saint George

Military service
- Allegiance: Principality of Serbia; Kingdom of Serbia; Kingdom of Yugoslavia
- Branch/service: Serbian Army
- Years of service: 1876–1921; 1941
- Rank: Field Marshal
- Commands: 1st Serbian Army
- Battles/wars: Serbo-Turkish War; Serbo-Bulgarian War; First Balkan War; Second Balkan War; World War I World War II

Petar Bojović GCLH, KCMG (Serbian: Петар Бојовић, pronounced [pětar bǒːjoʋitɕ]; 16 July 1858 – 19 January 1945) was a Serbian and Yugoslav military commander who fought in the Serbo-Turkish War, the Serbo-Bulgarian War, the First Balkan War, the Second Balkan War, and World War I. He was briefly the Deputy Commander-in-Chief of the Yugoslav Royal Army in World War II, but played no real part in the conduct of the defence of Yugoslavia when it was invaded by the Axis powers in April 1941.

Following the breakthrough on the Thessaloniki Front of World War I, he became the fourth Serbian officer promoted to field marshal.

== Life ==
=== Early life ===
Bojović was born on 16 July 1858 in Miševići, Nova Varoš.

He fought in Serbian-Ottoman Wars from 1876 to 1878 as a cadet of the Artillery school, as well as in wars that Serbia waged at the beginning of the 20th century. He was Chief of the General Staff for the first time from 1905 to 1908.

=== Balkan Wars ===
In the Balkan Wars, he was the Chief of Staff of the 1st Army, which scored huge success in battles of Kumanovo, Bitola (First Balkan War) and Bregalnica (Second Balkan War). He took part in peace negotiations with Turkey, held in London in 1913, as a military expert in the Serbian Government delegation.

=== World War I ===
At the start of World War I, he was given command of the 1st Army. His army suffered huge losses at the Battle of Drina in 1914, but managed to stop the Austro-Hungarian offensive. Bojović was wounded in the battle, and was replaced at the army general position by Živojin Mišić. In January 1916, he was appointed Chief of General Staff for a second time in place of the ailing vojvoda Radomir Putnik, who was carried by his soldiers to the city of Skadar. He held that position until June 1918, when he resigned because of disputes with the allied generals on the issue of widening the Thessaloniki Front. He returned to his position Commander of the 1st Army, which broke the enemy lines and advanced deep into the occupied territory. He received the title of Field Marshal on 26 September [O.S. 13 September] 1918 for his contribution during the war.

=== Inter-war years and World War II ===
In 1921, he was appointed Chief of the General Staff of the Yugoslav Army, and in 1922 he withdrew from active service.

At the very beginning of World War II, Petar Bojovic was appointed Deputy Commander-in-Chief of the Yugoslavian Armed Forces by the young King Petar II Karađorđević. However, because of his old age, he did not participate in the events that followed.

=== Death ===
One of the most famous historical myths in Serbia is that Bojović was tortured by the new communist authorities following the liberation of Belgrade in October 1944 and that he died from the consequences of that torture. Bojović was indeed questioned by the new authorities for three days, however according to Kosta Rakić, a close family friend of Bojović, the elderly commander was not harmed in any way during the interrogation. Two months passed between the questioning and Bojović's death. Later two members of the Yugoslav Partisans, including an officer, broke into his home, insulted him and stole his sabre. Bojović's son Dobrica then hit the officer who fell down the stairs, and then both Partisans ran away. Bojović was disturbed by the incident, but wasn't physically harmed during it. Bojović died on January 19, 1945, from pneumonia.

Bojović was not buried with military and state honors, but privately. This was expected as Bojović was a commander of the Yugoslav Royal Army that capitulated in 1941 and state that didn't exist anymore. Two members of OZNA were present at his funeral.

== Awards and decorations ==
Serbian and Yugoslavian military decorations
Order of the Karađorđe's Star, Grand Cross
Order of the Karađorđe's Star, Commander
Order of the Karađorđe's Star, Knight
Order of the Karađorđe's Star with Swords, Grand Officer
Order of the Karađorđe's Star with Swords, Commander
Order of the Karađorđe's Star with Swords, Officer
Order of the White Eagle, Commander
Order of the White Eagle, Officer
Order of the White Eagle, Knight
Order of the White Eagle with swords, Grand Cross
Order of the White Eagle with swords, Knight
Order of the Yugoslav Crown, Knight Grand Cross
Order of St. Sava, Commander
Order of the Cross of Takovo, Grand Officer
Order of the Cross of Takovo, Commander
Order of the Cross of Takovo, Officer
Order of the Cross of Takovo, Knight
Serbian Service Medals
Medal for Bravery
Commemorative medal of the King Petar I
Commemorative medal of the wars with Turkey 1876-1878
Commemorative medal of the war with Bulgaria 1885
Commemorative Medal of the First Balkan War
Commemorative Medal of the Second Balkan War
Commemorative Medal of the First World War
Commemorative Medal of the Albanian Campaign
International and Foreign Awards
Order of St Michael and St George, Knight Commander (United Kingdom)
Order of St Michael and St George, Companion (United Kingdom)
Order of Franz Joseph, Knight (Austria-Hungary)
Legion of Honour, Grand Officer (France)
Legion of Honour, Commandeur (France)
Legion of Honour, Officer (France)
Legion of Honour, Chevalier (France)
War Cross 1914–1918, Bronze palm (France)
Order of the Redeemer, Grand Commander (Greece)
Order of the Redeemer, Gold Cross (Greece)
Order of Saint Alexander (Bulgaria), II class (Kingdom of Bulgaria)
Order of Military Merit, II class (Bulgaria)
Order of Civil Merit, II class (Bulgaria)
Order of Saints Maurice and Lazarus, Knight Grand Cross (Italy)
Order of the Dannebrog, Knight (Kingdom of Denmark)
Order of Saint Vladimir, III class (Russian Empire)
Order of St. George with swords, III class (Russian Empire)

== See also ==
- Radomir Putnik
- Živojin Mišić
- Stepa Stepanović
- Božidar Janković
- Ilija Gojković
- Pavle Jurišić Šturm
- Ivan S. Pavlović

== Literature ==
- DiNardo, Richard L. (2015). Invasion: The Conquest of Serbia, 1915. Santa Barbara: Praeger. ISBN 9781440800924.
- Leko, Milan; Vartabedijan, Miodrag (2006). Beogradske ulice i trgovi 1872-2006. Beograd: Zavod za udžbenike. ISBN 9788617128584.

Military offices
Preceded by Radomir Putnik	Chief of the General Staff (acting); 1915–1916	Succeeded by Continued service
Preceded by Himself	Chief of the General Staff; 1916–1918	Succeeded by Živojin Mišić
Preceded by Živojin Mišić	Chief of the General Staff of the Army of The Kingdom of Serbs, Croats and Slovenes; 1921	Succeeded by Petar Pešić
Preceded by Prince Paul	Deputy Commander in Chief of the Yugoslavian Armed Forces; 1941	Succeeded by Dušan Simović
