= Third Army (Serbia) =

Serbian Third Army Српска Трећа Армија
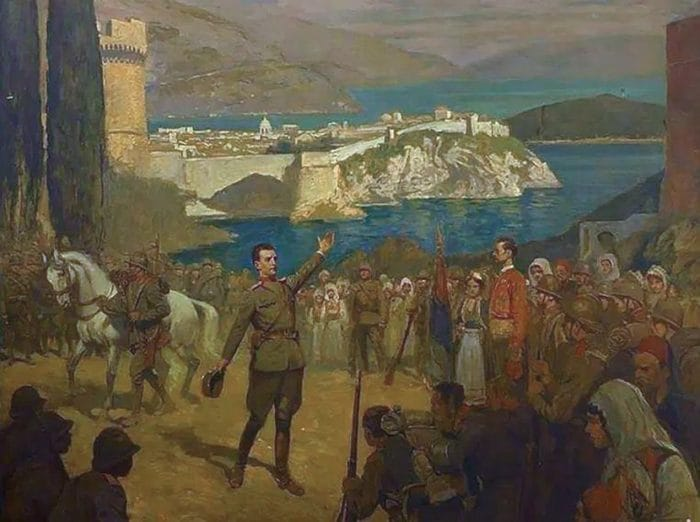
- Serbian army liberates Dubrovnik by Georges Scott (1918)
- Active: 1912–1919
- Country: Kingdom of Serbia
- Type: Field Army
- Role: Conventional warfare
- Size: 76,000 in 1912; 3 divisions & 1 detachment
- Engagements: First Balkan War; World War I

Commanders
- Notable commanders: Božidar Janković; Pavle Jurišić Šturm; Miloš Vasić

The Serbian Third Army (Serbian: Српска Трећа Армија/Srpska Treća armija) was a field army of the Army of the Kingdom of Serbia that fought during the Balkan Wars and World War I.

== History ==
=== Balkan wars ===
During the First Balkan War, the Third Army participated in the Battle of Kumanovo (23 - October 24, 1912) along with the Serbian First Army and the Serbian Second Army. It was composed of four infantry divisions and one infantry brigade (76,000 men), deployed in two groups, the first one at Toplica and the second one at Medveđa. It was assigned to the westernmost attack, with the task of taking Kosovo and then moving south to attack the left flank of the Ottoman Army.

=== World War I ===
At the start of World War I, the Third Army under the command of General Pavel Jurišić Šturm, took up positions on the northwestern border from the mouth of the Kolubara River to Ljubovia with the Drina Division of the first levy in the vicinity of Valjevo.

The Third Army fought in the successful Battles of Cer, Drina and Kolubra in 1914. But in Autumn 1915 they were defeated by German-Bulgarian forces during the Kosovo Offensive.
The Third Army was reestablished at the Macedonian front in 1916 and fought several battles against the Bulgarians, until it was disbanded on 28 March 1917.

Pavle Jurišić Šturm remained commander of the Third Army until August 1916, when he was replaced by Miloš Vasić.

== Organization ==
=== First Balkan War ===
Divisions and brigades	Regiments and batteries
Gen. Božidar Janković
Šumadija Division I line: Col. Đorđe Mihailović	X infantry regiment (I line); XI infantry regiment (I line); XII infantry regiment (I line) - Lt. Col. Milivoje Stojanović; XIX infantry regiment (I line); Šumadija field artillery regiment (9 batteries); Šumadija divisional cavalry division
Morava Division II line: Col. Milovan Nedić	I infantry regiment (II line); II infantry regiment (II line) - Lt. Col. Dušan Vasić; III infantry regiment (II line); Morava field artillery division (3 batteries); Morava divisional cavalry division
Drina division II line: Col. Pavle Paunović	V infantry regiment (II line); VI infantry regiment (II line); Drina field artillery division (minus 3rd battery attached to Javor Brigade); Drina divisional cavalry division
Morava brigade I line: Lt. Col. Stevan Milovanović	I supernumerary infantry regiment (I line) - Lt. Col. Živojin Bacić; II supernumerary infantry regiment (I line); 9th battery (detached from Morava field artillery regiment); cavalry division
Army cavalry:	two squadrons of cavalry
Army artillery:	2nd mountain artillery division; 3rd mountain artillery division; 3rd howitzer battery; 4th howitzer battery; 4th heavy battery 120 mm
Chetnik detachments Maj. Marjanović	Medveđa; Kuršumlija; Lukovo; Kolašin

=== World War I : August 1914 ===
Commander : Pavle Jurišić Šturm

Divisions and brigades	Regiments, battalions, detachments and batteries
I Drina Infantry Division	Valjevo (Staff)
II Drina Infantry Division	Ljubovija; Krupanj; Loznica (reserve)
Detachments guarding Drina river:	Obrenovac detachment; 6 infantry battalions; 1 cavalry troop; 2 artillery batteries; Šabac detachment; 8 infantry battalions; 1 cavalry troop; 2 artillery batteries; Loznica and Lesnica detachments; 6 infantry battalions; 1 cavalry troop; 3 artillery batteries; Ljubovija detachment; 2 infantry battalions III; 1 artillery battery; Debelo Brdo detachment; 1 infantry battalion III; Jadar Chetnik detachment - 500 chetniks; Rudnik Chetnik detachment - 500 chetniks

== See also ==
- First Army (Serbia)
- Second Army (Serbia)
