= Božidar Janković (general) =

Serbian army general (1849–1920)

Božidar Janković Божидар Јанковић
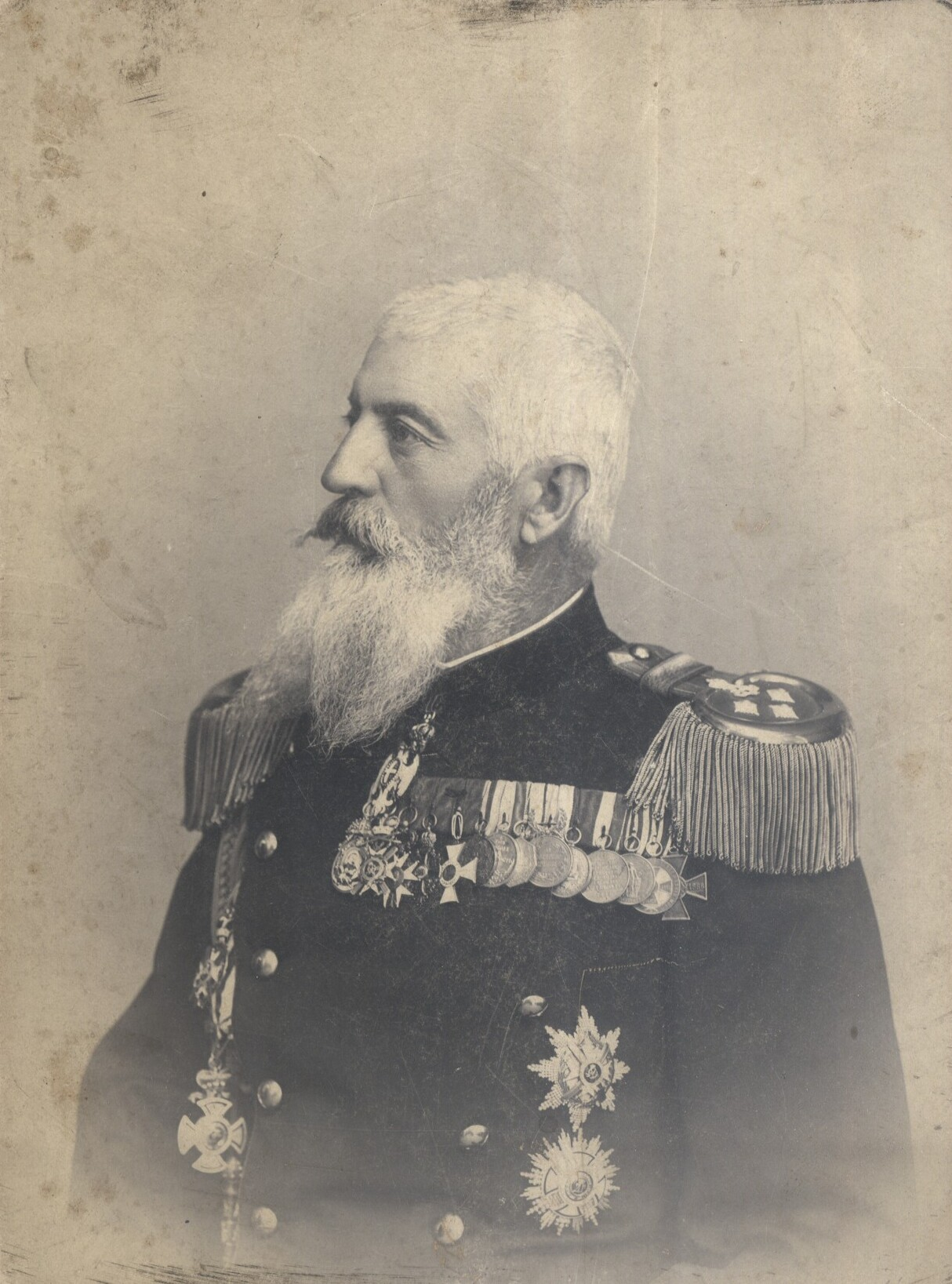
- Božidar Janković

23rd Minister of the Army of the Kingdom of Serbia
- In office 27 April 1901 – 3 August 1901
- Monarch: Peter I
- Prime Minister: Mihailo Vujić
- Preceded by: Miloš Vasić
- Succeeded by: Čedomilj Miljković

1st Chief of the Supreme Command of the Kingdom of Montenegro
- In office 6 August 1914 – 20 April 1915
- Commander-in-chief: Nicholas I
- Preceded by: Position created
- Succeeded by: Petar Pešić

Personal details
- Born: 7 December 1849 Belgrade, Serbia
- Died: 7 July 1920 (aged 70) Herceg Novi, Kingdom of Serbs, Croats and Slovenes

Military service
- Allegiance: Principality of Serbia; Kingdom of Serbia
- Rank: General
- Commands: Serbian Third Army
- Battles/wars: Serbian–Ottoman Wars (1876–1878); Serbo-Bulgarian War; First Balkan War • Battle of Kumanovo • Battle of Lumë; First World War

Božidar Janković (Serbian Cyrillic: Божидар Јанковић; 7 December 1849 – 7 July 1920) was a Serbian army general commander of the Serbian Third Army during the First Balkan War between the Balkan League and the Ottoman Empire. In 1901 he served as Minister of the Army in the Ministry of Defence.

== Biography ==
He graduated from the Military Academy of the General Staff School. He became State Secretary of Military Matters of Serbia in 1902. As President of the National Defence, he participated in the Chetnik fighting for Macedonia.

In World War I he was the Chief of Staff of the Montenegrin Supreme Command until June 1915 and a delegate of the Serbian Supreme Command at the Montenegrin Supreme Command.

Janković died on 7 July 1920 in the town of Herceg Novi. The town of Elez Han in Kosovo was named 'Đeneral Janković' after him. His son Milojko B. Jankovic (1884 - 1973) was the army general in the army of the Kingdom of Yugoslavia.

He was awarded Order of the White Eagle and a number of other decorations.

== See also ==
- Ministry of Defence
- Petar Bojović
- Radomir Putnik
- Živojin Mišić
- Stepa Stepanović
- Ilija Gojković
- Pavle Jurišić Šturm
- Ivan S. Pavlović

Political offices
Preceded by Miloš Vasić	Minister of Defence; 1901	Succeeded by Čedomilj Miljković
