= Radomir Putnik =

Serbian field marshal (1847–1917)

Vojvoda Radomir Putnik
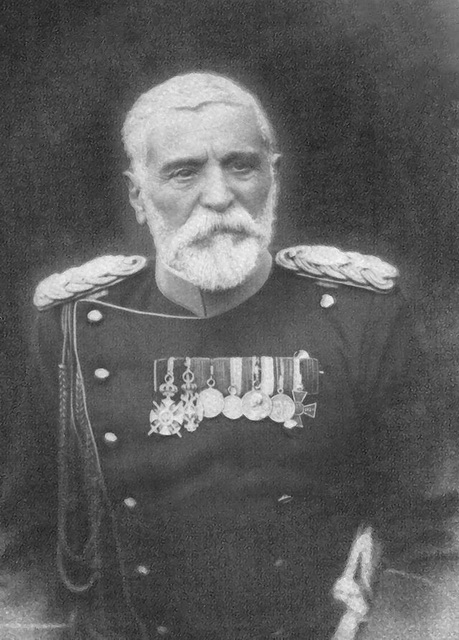

1st Chief of Staff of the Supreme Command of the Royal Serbian Army
- In office 8 October 1912 – 8 December 1915
- Monarch: Peter I
- Preceded by: Himself
- Succeeded by: Petar Bojović (acting)

4tn, 9th, 11th and 14th Chief of the General Staff of Kingdom of Serbia
- In office 1908 – 8 December 1915
- Monarch: Peter I
- Preceded by: Petar Bojović (acting)
- Succeeded by: Petar Bojović (acting)
- In office 1904–1905
- Monarch: Peter I
- Preceded by: Živojin Mišić (acting)
- Succeeded by: Aleksandar Mašin (acting)
- In office 1903–1904
- Monarch: Peter I
- Preceded by: Svetozar T. Nešić
- Succeeded by: Živojin Mišić (acting)
- In office 1890 – 1892; Acting
- Monarch: Alexander I
- Preceded by: Jovan Mišković
- Succeeded by: Jovan Mišković

30th, 33rd and 40th Minister of Army of Kingdom of Serbia
- In office 4 June – 2 October 1912
- Monarch: Peter I
- Prime Minister: Milovan Milovanović; Marko Trifković; Nikola Pašić
- Preceded by: Stepa Stepanović
- Succeeded by: Radovije Vojović
- In office 17 April 1906 – 30 March 1908
- Monarch: Peter I
- Prime Minister: Sava Grujić; Nikola Pašić
- Preceded by: Sava Grujić
- Succeeded by: Stepa Stepanović
- In office 26 January 1904 – 16 May 1905
- Monarch: Peter I
- Prime Minister: Sava Grujić; Nikola Pašić
- Preceded by: Milan Andrejević
- Succeeded by: Vasilije Antonić

Personal details
- Born: 24 January 1847 Kragujevac, Principality of Serbia
- Died: 17 May 1917 (aged 70) Nice, France
- Resting place: Belgrade New Cemetery
- Spouse: Ljubica Putnik (m. 1879)
- Children: Seven
- Education: Military Academy Serbia
- Profession: Army officer
- Awards: See Awards and decorations

Military service
- Allegiance: Principality of Serbia; Kingdom of Serbia
- Branch/service: Serbian Army
- Years of service: 1861–1896; 1903–1917
- Rank: Field Marshal
- Battles/wars: Serbo-Turkish War; Serbo-Bulgarian War; First Balkan War; Second Balkan War; World War I

Radomir Putnik GOLH, KCMG (Serbian: Радомир Путник; pronounced [rǎdɔmiːr pûːtniːk]; 24 January 1847 – 17 May 1917) was a Serbian military leader and the first Field Marshal of Serbia. Serving as Chief of the General Staff, he played a pivotal role in the Balkan Wars and in the First World War, commanding Serbian forces in some of their most significant victories. His career, spanning every major conflict involving Serbia from 1876 to 1917, left a lasting impact on Serbian military strategy and national identity.

== Biography ==
=== Family background and early career ===
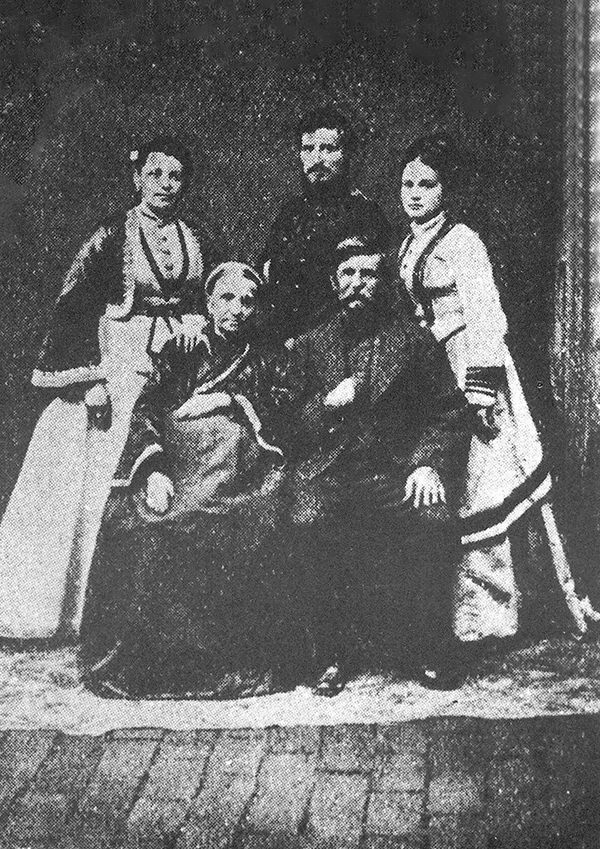
Putnik with his family

Radomir Putnik was born on 12 January 1847 in Kragujevac, Principality of Serbia. His family originated in Kosovo but fled to the Habsburg monarchy during the Great Serb Migration of 1690. After generations in exile, the family returned to the Principality of Serbia, which became the first modern Serbian polity to achieve independence from Ottoman rule in the mid-19th century. Radomir Putnik was born into this resettled lineage. His father, Dimitrije, worked as a teacher in Kragujevac, where Radomir completed his early education.

Putnik pursued a military career, enrolling at the Artillery School in Belgrade, a precursor to the Military Academy, and graduating in 1863 as the eighth-ranked student in his class. He continued his education in Russia and later joined the General Staff of the Serbian Army. He gained recognition as an artillery officer during Serbia's wars against the Ottoman Empire in 1876–77. Notably, he commanded forces that captured Gnjilane and Gračanica during the closing stages of the second Serbo-Ottoman War (1877–78). Following an armistice between Russia and the Ottomans, his troops were ordered to withdraw to Merdare. In 1885, he participated in the Serbo-Bulgarian War.

After these military campaigns, Putnik became a professor at the Military Academy, serving from 1886 to 1895. He was promoted to colonel in 1889 and became deputy chief of the General Staff in 1890. His career, however, was affected by political conflicts, particularly with King Milan I. Putnik’s refusal to support a favoured protégé of the monarch led to tensions. In 1895, he was forced to retire by royal decree, amid allegations of sympathies for the Radical Party of Nikola Pašić.

=== Rehabilitation under Peter I ===
Putnik was rehabilitated following the coup d'état against Alexander I Obrenović in 1903. Under the new King of Serbia, Peter I Karadjordjević, he was promoted to the rank of general and appointed as the Chief of the General Staff.

Putnik served as Serbian Minister of Army on three occasions: in 1904, 1906–1908, and 1912. In this role, he reorganized the Serbian army by retiring outdated officers, promoting younger talent, and modernizing obsolete war plans. During this time, he appointed General Živojin Mišić as his deputy.

In 1912, he commanded the Royal Serbian Army to decisive victories in the First Balkan War against the Ottoman Empire, including the Battle of Kumanovo in October and the Battle of Monastir in November. He was then promoted to Field Marshal. Anticipating a Bulgarian offensive, Putnik strategically deployed his troops at vital locations near the Bregalnica River. This preparation proved critical in achieving a swift and decisive response to the sudden, unannounced Bulgarian attack. He secured a crucial victory at the Battle of Bregalnica in 1913 defeating the Bulgarians in the Second Balkan War.

=== World War I ===
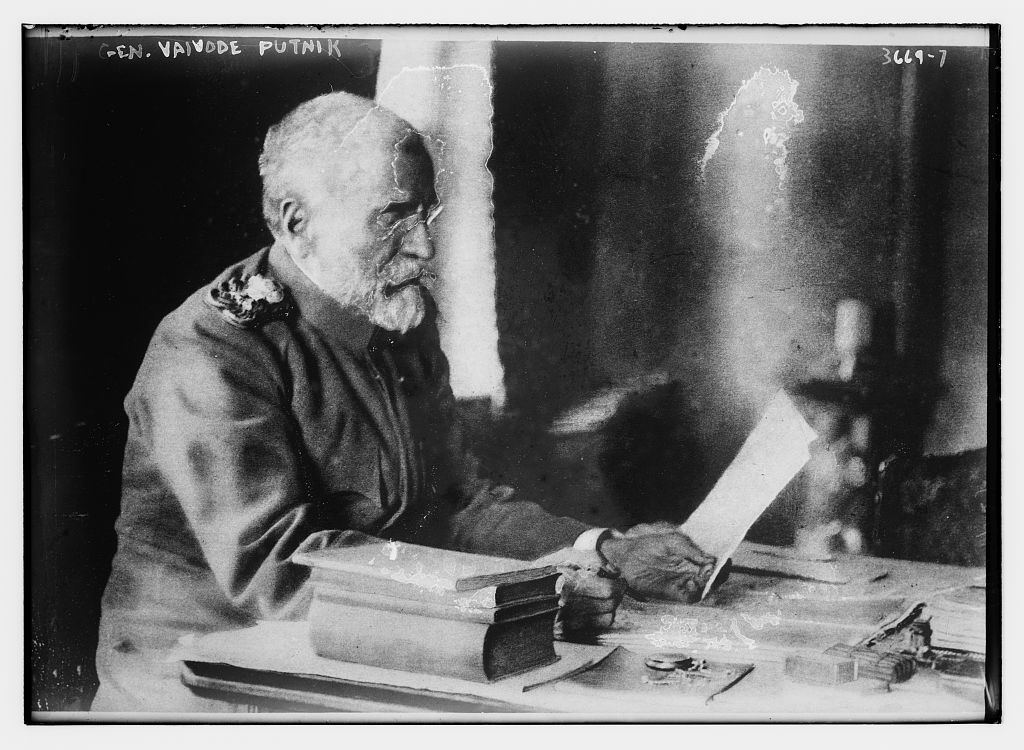
Radomir Putnik in his office

Caught in Budapest, where he was undergoing medical treatment for chronic emphysema, Putnik found himself in a precarious situation when Austria-Hungary declared war on Serbia. In an act of chivalry, the Austro-Hungarian emperor Franz Josef granted him safe passage back to Serbia, a gesture some viewed as self-defeating. After enduring a difficult journey, Putnik returned to Serbia and immediately offered his resignation to King Peter I of Serbia, citing his advanced age and declining health. The king refused, insisting that Putnik continue to lead the army in a strategic capacity, while younger generals such as Stepa Stepanović, Živojin Mišić, and Petar Bojović assumed operational duties. Putnik successfully orchestrated the campaign, culminating in Serbia's victory over Austro-Hungarian offensives during the Battle of Cer and the Battle of Kolubara in August and September 1914, driving the enemy out of Serbia by December.

In early 1915, Prince Alexander sought to assume direct command of the army, a proposal that Putnik firmly opposed on constitutional grounds, arguing that a monarch could not take on such a responsibility.

The Serbian front remained relatively quiet until the autumn of 1915, when Austro-Hungarian, German, and Bulgarian forces, under the command of German Field Marshal August von Mackensen, launched a massive offensive with over 300,000 troops. Before the assault, Putnik had warned the Serbian government about Bulgaria's troop buildup along the eastern border and advocated for a preemptive strike. This strategy was dismissed due to Allied pressure to avoid provoking Bulgaria. Despite determined resistance, Serbian forces were overwhelmed and forced to retreat. On 31 October, Putnik ordered a general withdrawal to Kragujevac in an effort to maintain cohesion among his exhausted troops. Many soldiers, particularly those who were farmers, abandoned the army to return to their villages. The retreat continued into Albania in early November 1915, aided by the reluctance of enemy forces to pursue the Serbian army through the harsh Albanian highlands. Believing victory in Serbia was assured, the Central Powers redirected their focus to other fronts, with Mackensen prioritising the Eastern Front and the Bulgarians content with their territorial acquisitions.

The final confrontation of the campaign occurred in Kosovo, on the Field of the Blackbirds, between 19 and 24 November 1915. The Serbian army, already weakened by typhus outbreaks and severe shortages of food and ammunition, faced inevitable defeat. On 25 November, Putnik gave the order to retreat further south and west, through Montenegro and into Albania, aiming to reach Allied ships that could transport the remnants of the army to safety in the Ionian islands. Thousands of soldiers and civilians perishing from hunger, disease, enemy attacks, and ambushes by Albanian tribal bands. Ultimately, out of approximately 250,000 soldiers and civilians, only 155,000 made it to the Adriatic Sea, where Allied transport ships evacuated them to Greek islands such as Corfu. The survivors later regrouped and joined the Salonika front in April 1916.

Putnik, whose health had deteriorated significantly during the retreat, was carried in a sedan chair through the snow-covered mountains of Albania. Suffering from bronchitis, influenza, and pneumonia, he was eventually received by Allied forces in Scutari (Skadar) and transported to Brindisi and later Corfu with the core of the Serbian army.

=== Dismissal and death ===
In the aftermath of tensions and recriminations between the Serbian Government and the High Command, the entire General Staff was dismissed in January 1916, including Putnik. He felt deeply embittered upon learning of his dismissal in a particularly undignified manner through a cashier who issued his salary without the supplement for the Chief of General Staff. Following his dismissal, Putnik travelled to Nice, where he was received with honours by the French authorities, who provided him with a villa in recognition of his service.

Putnik's health, already fragile, worsened as he succumbed to lung emphysema. He died on 17 May 1917, never returning to his homeland. In November 1926, his remains were repatriated to Serbia and interred with full honours in a chapel at Belgrade's New Cemetery. His grave bears the epitaph: "Grateful Homeland to Radomir Putnik."

== Personal life ==
In 1879, he married Ljubica Bojović, the sister of Radivoje Bojović who would later serve as Serbia's Minister of Military Affairs. Ljubica was also the daughter of Colonel Todor Bojović and Jelena Tadić. Together, they had seven children, three daughters and four sons.

== Legacy and assessments ==
Mount Putnik in Alberta, Canada was named after him in 1918 for his exceptional services to the allied cause. He is included in The 100 most prominent Serbs.

Contemporaries described Putnik as a reserved and disciplined man, known for his ascetic lifestyle and heavy smoking. Despite his introverted nature, he was deeply committed to his profession and unyielding in his principles.

== Military career ==
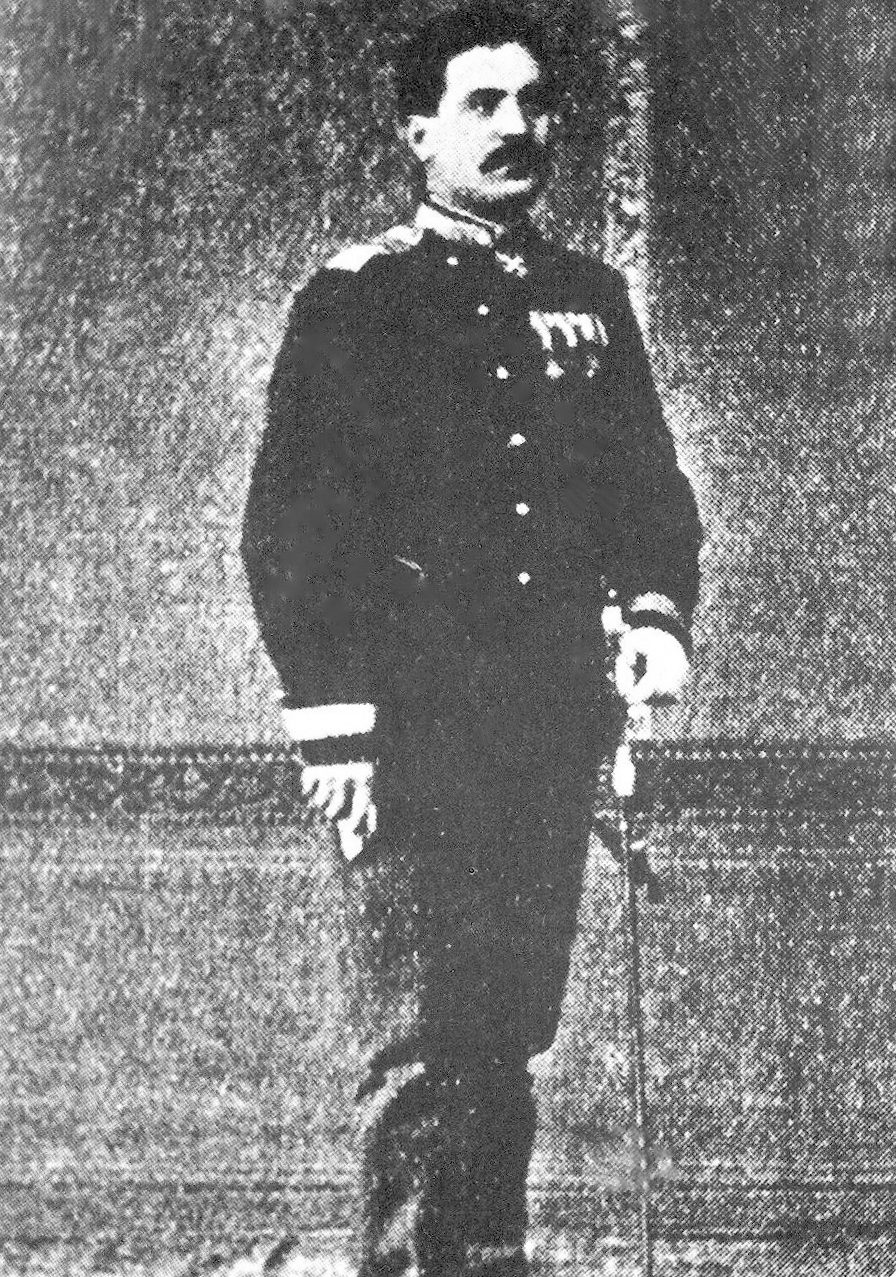
Putnik as a major, 1879

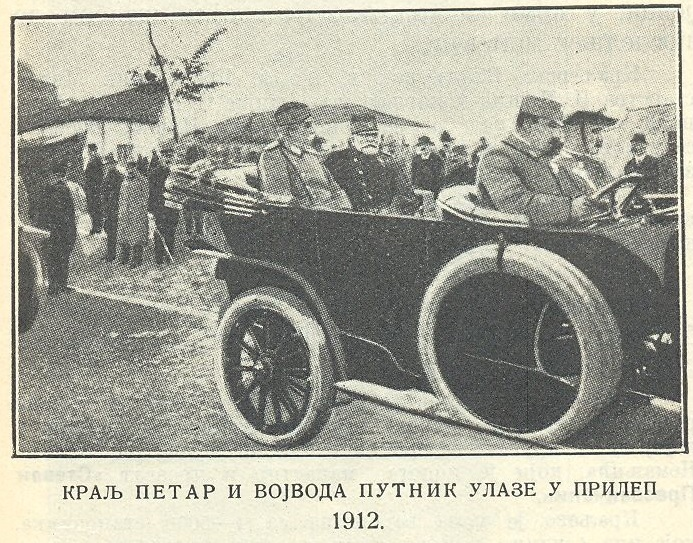
Field Marshal Putnik and King Peter I of Serbia entering Prilep

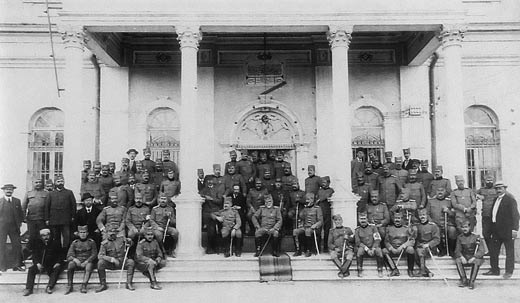
Royal Serbian Army HQ in modern-day Skopje

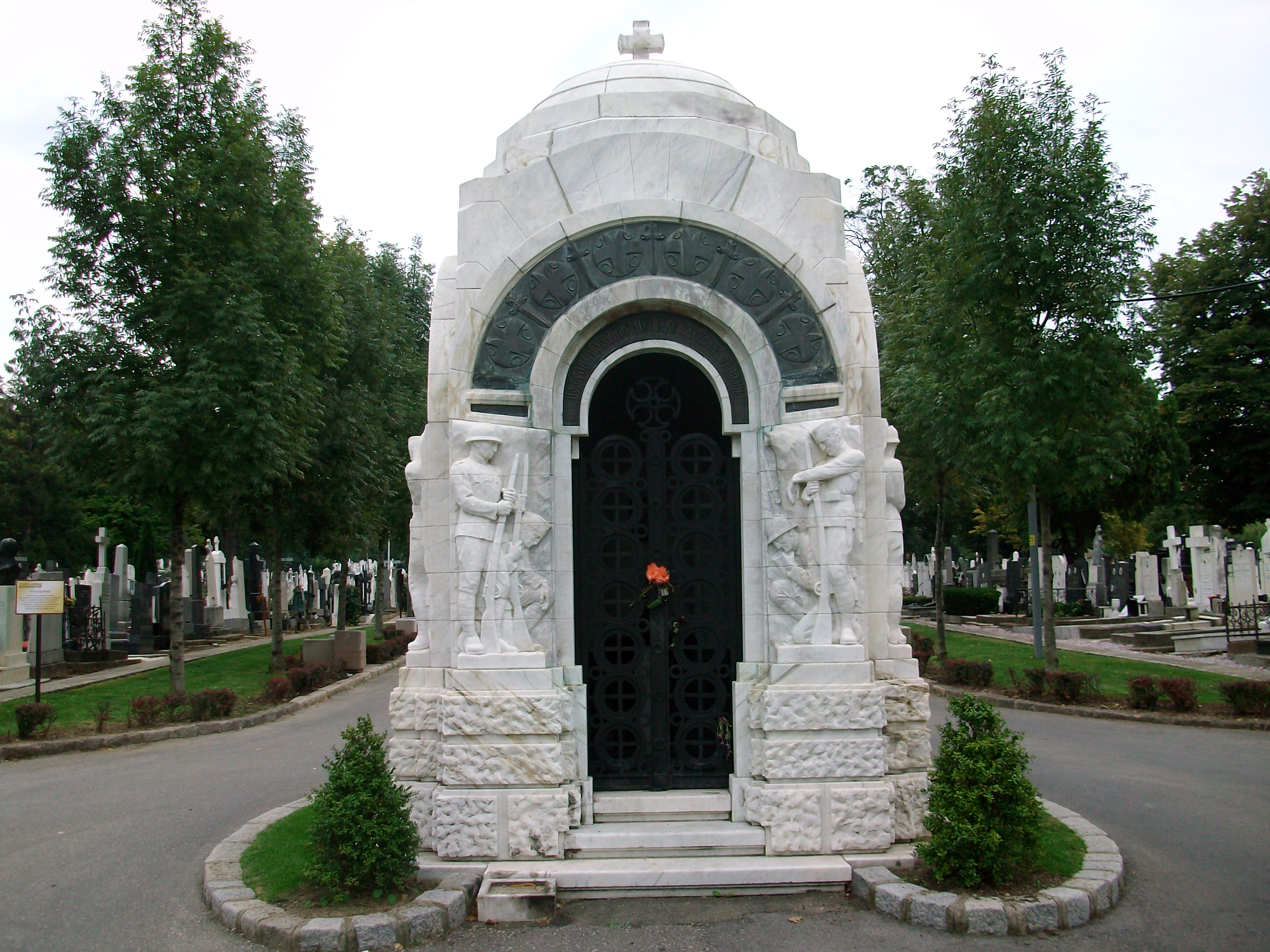
Chapel with Putnik's remains, Belgrade New Cemetery

- Commander of 3rd Mountain Battery, January 1867
- Commander of Čačak Battery of People's Army, October 1868
- Commander of 4th Mountain Battery, April 1867
- Commander of Merzetska Battery, February 1871
- Duties at Artillery inspection, October 1872
- Duties at Department of the Artillery, January 1874
- Chief of Artillery Factory at Kragujevac, 1875
- Adjutant I class of Rudnik Brigade, April 1876
- Chief of staff of Rudnik Brigade, June 1876
- Commander of Rudnik Brigade, 1876
- Commander of Vranje Military District, 1878
- Duties at Artillery Department of Ministry of the Military, 1879
- Chief of staff of Division of standing army, 1880
- Commander of Toplica Military District, April 1881
- Duties at Artillery Department of Ministry of the Military, March 1883
- Chief of staff of Danube Division, September 1883
- Chief of Foreign Intelligence Department of Operational Department of Main General Staff, 1886
- Chief of Operational Department of Main General Staff, April 1888
- Deputy Chief of Main General Staff, 1890
- President of examination committee for a rank of major, March 1893
- Commander of Šumadija Division, June 1893
- President of examination committee for a rank of major, April 1894
- Deputy Chairman of the Military Court of Cassation, January 1895
- Retired on 26 October 1896
- Chief of General Staff, 1903

== Awards and decorations ==
Serbian military decorations
Order of the Karađorđe's Star, Knight Grand Cross
Order of the Karađorđe's Star, Grand Officer
Order of the Karađorđe's Star with Swords, Grand Officer
Order of the Karađorđe's Star with Swords, Commander
Order of the Karađorđe's Star with Swords, Officer
Order of the White Eagle, Commander
Order of the White Eagle, Officer
Order of the White Eagle, Knight
Order of St. Sava, Grand Cross
Order of the Cross of Takovo, Commander
Order of the Cross of Takovo, Officer
Order of the Cross of Takovo with swords, Cavalier;
Serbian Service Medals
Medal for Bravery, Gold
Medal for Bravery, Silver
Commemorative medal of the King Petar I
Commemorative medal of the wars with Turkey 1876-1878
Commemorative medal of the war with Bulgaria 1885
Medal for Devoted Service
Commemorative Medal of the First Balkan War
Commemorative Medal of the Second Balkan War
International and Foreign Awards
Order of the Iron Crown, 3rd class (Austria-Hungary)
Order of Military Merit, Grand Cross (Bulgaria)
Legion of Honour, Grand Officer (France)
Order of the Crown, Grand Officer (Romania)
Order of Saint Stanislaus, 1st class (Russian Empire)
Order of Saint Stanislaus with Swords, 3rd class (Russian Empire)
Order of St. George, 4th class (Russian Empire)
Order of St Michael and St George, Knight Commander (United Kingdom)

== Quotes ==
'Troop concentration on paper is a quick and easy matter.'

Ironic remark in a letter to Andra Knićanin on the movements of the Serbian army across very difficult terrain at the beginning of the Serbo-Turkish war of 1878.

'Those were only skirmishes with Turkish rearguards.'

Upon first hearing of the Battle of Kumanovo – The Serbian High Command expected that a decisive battle with the Ottoman forces has yet to take place – most likely on Ovče Polje plateau just north of Skopje. Also, due to communication problems, it first heard of the battle when it had already been won.

== See also ==
- Petar Bojović
- Živojin Mišić
- Stepa Stepanović
- Božidar Janković
- Ilija Gojković
- Pavle Jurišić Šturm
- Ivan S. Pavlović

Military offices
Preceded by Jovan Mišković	Chief of the General Staff (acting); 1890–1892	Succeeded by Jovan Mišković
Preceded by Svetozar Nešić (acting)	Chief of the General Staff; 1903–1905	Succeeded by Aleksandar Mašin (acting)
Political offices
Preceded by Milan Andrejević	Minister of Army; 1904–1905	Succeeded by Vasilije Antonić
Preceded by Sava Grujić	Minister of Army; 1906–1908	Succeeded by Stepa Stepanović
Preceded by Stepa Stepanović	Minister of Army; 1912	Succeeded by Radivoje Bojović
Military offices
Preceded by Petar Bojović (acting)	Chief of the General Staff; 1908–1915	Succeeded by Petar Bojović
