= Pavle Jurišić Šturm =

Serbian general

Pavle Jurišić Šturm KCMG
- Павле Јуришић Штурм
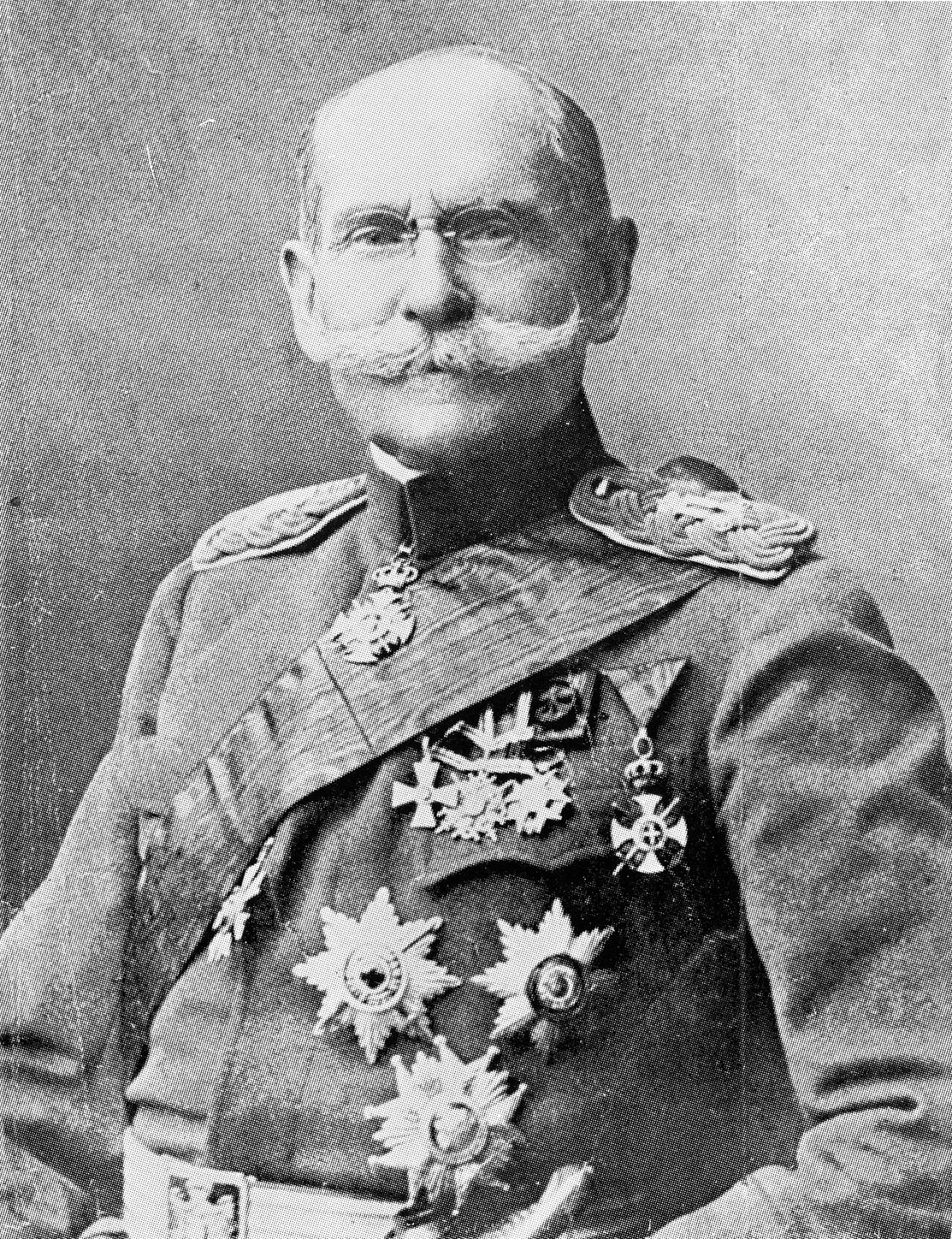

Chief of the Security and First General Adjutant
- In office 1908–1913
- Monarch: Peter I
- Preceded by: Božidar Terzić
- Succeeded by: Petar Bojović

Personal details
- Born: Paulus Eugen Sturm; 8 August 1848 Görlitz, Province of Silesia, Prussia
- Died: 13 January 1922 (aged 73) Belgrade, Kingdom of Serbs, Croats and Slovenes
- Resting place: New Cemetery Belgrade
- Spouse(s): Savka Jurišić (1881–1884; her death); Jelena Jurišić (?–1922; his death)
- Education: Land Forces Military Academy
- Profession: Army officer
- Awards: Order of the Star of Karageorge with Swords; Order of the White Eagle; Order of the Crown of Italy; Order of the Crown of Belgium; Order of Iron Cross
- Nickname: Šturm

Military service
- Allegiance: Prussia; German Empire; Principality of Serbia; Kingdom of Serbia; Kingdom of Serbs, Croats and Slovenes
- Branch/service: Serbian Army
- Years of service: 1867 – 1875; 1876 – 1900; 1901 – 1921
- Rank: General
- Commands: Serbian 3rd Army
- Battles/wars: Franco-Prussian War; Serbo-Turkish War; Serbo-Bulgarian War; First Balkan War; Second Balkan War; World War I

Pavle Jurišić Šturm KCMG (Serbian Cyrillic: Павле Јуришић Штурм; 8 August 1848 – 13 January 1922), born Paulus Eugen Sturm, was a Serbian general of Sorbian origin, best known for commanding the Serbian 3rd Army in World War I.

== Biography ==
Paulus Eugen Sturm was born on 22 August 1848. in Görlitz, Prussian Silesia, of ethnic Sorb origin. He moved with his brother to Serbia and joined the Serbian army. Šturm became one of the most important commanders in the Serbian army in World War I, especially during its first two years, the time when his 3rd army was main support either for the 2nd army during the battle of Cer (August 1914), or for the 1st army during the battle of Kolubara (November to December 1914).

He and his brother Eugene (Evgenije) graduated from the royal Prussian military academy in Breslau (Wrocław), and participated in the Franco-Prussian War of 1870–1871. They later resigned their commissions and moved to the Principality of Serbia, prior to the Serbian–Ottoman War (1876–78), in order to lecture at the Serbian Military Academy in Belgrade. With the outbreak of the war, the two brothers joined the Serbian Army as volunteers. Pavle also fought in the Serbo-Bulgarian War (1885) as commander of a regiment.

He liked Serbia, and married a Serbian woman. In order to become naturalised, he changed his name into Pavle Jurišić-Šturm in 1876, Pavle being a cognate of Paulus, and Jurišić being derived from a modulated translation of the word "charge" (sturm in German, juriš in Serbian). He kept his German last name as an alias ("Šturm").

In the Balkan Wars (1912–13) he was the General of the Drina Division, which distinguished itself at the Battle of Kumanovo after which he was promoted to the rank of general.

As commander of the Third Serbian Army, he participated in all major battles in the Serbian theater in World War I, from Cer and Kolubara, then retreated over frozen Albania, and the participation of the Serbian Army on the Salonika front. Here, his army fought in the Battle of Kajmakcalan, suffering many casualties. After this battle Sturm was replaced at the head of the Third Army by Miloš Vasić in October 1916. He was sent to Russia to assist the commander of the Serbian Volunteer Corps. In early 1917, he returned via Japan to Thessaloniki, where he was appointed Chancellor of the Order of the Crown, a job he held until the end of the war.

After years of peace that followed, Šturm stayed in Serbia and remained in its army with the rank of general. He died in 1922 at his home in Belgrade.

Šturm was decorated with Order of Order of the Karađorđe's Star, Order of the White Eagle and Allied decorations of the Order of the Crown of Italy, Order of St. George, BelgianOrder of the Crown, the Legion of Honour and the Order of St. Michael and St. George. Possibly the most valuable was the Order of Paulovnia Flowers on the Great Cross, personally decorated by Japanese Emperor. He was also the bearer of the Order of Iron Cross, 2nd class, and the Austrian Order of Leopold.

He was considered one of the greatest commanders of First World War and one of the best commanders in Serbian war history.

== Decorations ==
Serbian military decorations
Order of the Karađorđe's Star with Swords, Grand Officer
Order of the Karađorđe's Star with Swords, Commander
Order of the Karađorđe's Star with Swords, Officer
Order of the Karađorđe's Star, Officer
Order of the White Eagle, Grand Officer
Order of the White Eagle, Commander
Order of the White Eagle, Officer
Order of the White Eagle, Knight
Order of Miloš the Great, Officer
Order of the Cross of Takovo, Grand Officer
Order of the Cross of Takovo, Commander
Order of the Cross of Takovo with swords, Officer
Serbian Service Medals
Medal for Bravery, Gold
Medal for Bravery, Silver
Medal military virtues
Medal for Devoted Service
Medal of Guard
Commemorative medal of the wars with Turkey 1876-1878
Commemorative medal of the war with Bulgaria 1885
Commemorative Medal of the First Balkan War
Commemorative Medal of the Second Balkan War
Commemorative Medal of the First World War
Commemorative Medal of the Albanian Campaign
International and Foreign Awards
Order of Leopold, Knight (Austria-Hungary)
Order of Franz Joseph, Knight's Cross (Austria-Hungary)
Order of the Crown, Knight Grand Cross (Belgium)
Legion of Honour, Grand Officer (France)
Order of the Redeemer, Commander (Greece)
Order of the Crown of Italy, Knight Grand Cross (Italy)
Order of the Paulownia Flowers (Japan)
Order of Osmanieh, 3rd class (Ottoman Empire)
Order of the Medjidie, 1st class (Ottoman Empire)
Order of Iron Cross, 2nd class (Prussia)
Order of Saint Stanislaus with Swords, 3rd class (Russian Empire)
Order of St. George, 4th class (Russian Empire)
Order of St. Anna, 1st class (Russian Empire)
Order of St Michael and St George, Knight Commander (United Kingdom)

== See also ==
- Petar Bojović
- Radomir Putnik
- Živojin Mišić
- Stepa Stepanović
- Božidar Janković
- Ilija Gojković
- Ivan S. Pavlović

== Sources ==
Books

- Aleksandar Jovanović (1991). Sedam ratova generala Pavla Jurišića Šturma. Litera. ISBN 9788674670088.

News articles

- Rajs, Arčibald (11 November 2014). "Srpska duša generala Šturma" [Serbian Soul of General Sturm] (in Serbian). Večernje novosti.
- Milatović, Petar (19 December 2014). "Сви јуриши браће Штурм" [All Storms of Šturm Brothers] (in Serbian). Politikin Zabavnik. Archived from the original on 21 December 2014.
- "Од пруског водника до српског генерала" [From Prussian Sergeant to Serbian General]. Radio Television of Serbia. 12 October 2014. Archived from the original on 17 October 2014.
- "Šturm ponovo dobija bistu" [Šturm Gets the Monument Again]. Vesti Online. 12 March 2014.
