= Živojin Mišić =

Serbian field marshal (1855-1921)

Vojvoda Živojin Mišić
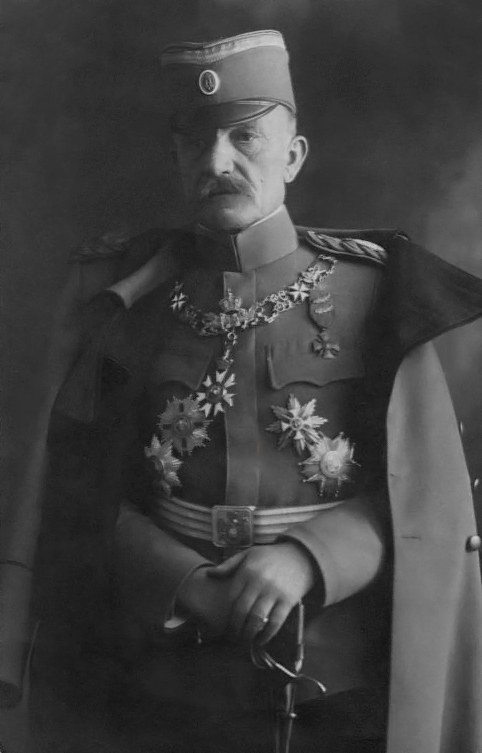
- Živojin Mišić (1919)

Chief of the General Staff of the Royal Yugoslav Armed Forces
- In office 5 May 1920 – 20 January 1921
- Monarch: Peter I
- Preceded by: Himself
- Succeeded by: Petar Bojović

Chief of Staff of the Supreme Command of the Royal Yugoslav Army
- In office 1 December 1918 – 5 May 1920
- Monarch: Peter I
- Preceded by: Himself
- Succeeded by: Himself

Chief of Staff of the Supreme Command of the Serbian Army
- In office 1 July 1918 – 1 December 1918
- Monarch: Peter I
- Preceded by: Petar Bojović
- Succeeded by: Himself

Personal details
- Born: 19 June 1855 Struganik, Mionica, Serbia
- Died: 20 January 1921 (aged 65) Belgrade, Kingdom of Serbs, Croats and Slovenes
- Resting place: Belgrade New Cemetery
- Spouse: Louise Krikner (1884–1921; his death)
- Children: Eleonora Mišić; Olga Mišić; Radovan Mišić; Anđelija Mišić; Aleksandar Mišić; Vojislav Mišić
- Education: Military Academy Serbia
- Profession: Army officer
- Awards: Order of Karađorđe's Star with Swords; Order of Saint Michael and Saint George; Legion of Honour; Order of the Redeemer; Order of the Crown of Italy (full list in the article)

Military service
- Allegiance: Principality of Serbia; Kingdom of Serbia; Kingdom of Serbs, Croats and Slovenes
- Branch/service: Serbian Army
- Years of service: 1874–1904; 1909–1913; 1914–1921
- Rank: Field marshal
- Commands: Serbian 1st Army
- Battles/wars: Serbo-Turkish War; Serbo-Bulgarian War; First Balkan War; Battle of Kumanovo; Battle of Bitola; Second Balkan War; Battle of Bregalnica; World War I; Serbian campaign (1914); Battle of Kolubara; Kosovo offensive (1915); Thessaloniki Front; Bitola Offensive; Battle of Kaymakchalan; Battle of the Crna Bend (1916); Vardar offensive; Battle of Dobro Pole

Živojin Mišić GCLH, KCB, GCMG (Serbian Cyrillic: Живојин Мишић; 19 July 1855 – 20 January 1921) was a field marshal who participated in all of Serbia's wars from 1876 to 1918. He directly commanded the First Serbian army in the Battle of Kolubara and in breach of the Thessaloniki Front was the Chief of the Supreme Command. He is the most decorated Serbian military officer in history.

== Early years ==
Mišić was born in Struganik near Mionica. His parents Radovan and Anđelija had thirteen children. Živojin was the youngest child, and when he was born, only eight of his brothers and sisters were still alive.

When he turned six, he became a shepherd. He finished primary school in Kragujevac. In 1868, he started his gymnasium education in Kragujevac, where he finished his primary schooling and part of his secondary, before completing the rest in Belgrade. He was admitted to the Military Academy in 1874.

In late 1884, he married a German woman, Louise Krikner (1865-1956), at Ascension Church in Belgrade, and they had six children, three sons and three daughters.

He participated with distinction in the Serbo-Turkish wars of 1876 and 1878 with the rank of lieutenant JG of the infantry and in the Serbo-Bulgarian War of 1885 as a full lieutenant - a company commander in the 5th infantry regiment of Drinska division.

He subsequently studied in Austria. In 1891, he joined the Serbian General Staff and from 1898 to 1904, he taught at the Military Academy in Belgrade.

Sometime after the assassination of King Aleksandar Obrenović (see May Overthrow), he was forced to retire, supposedly through the influence of the "Black Hand" as he was considered too close to the Obrenović dynasty, but was reactivated on the personal insistence of the Chief of Staff of the High command of the Serbian Army, General Radomir Putnik who made him his aide.

== Military career ==
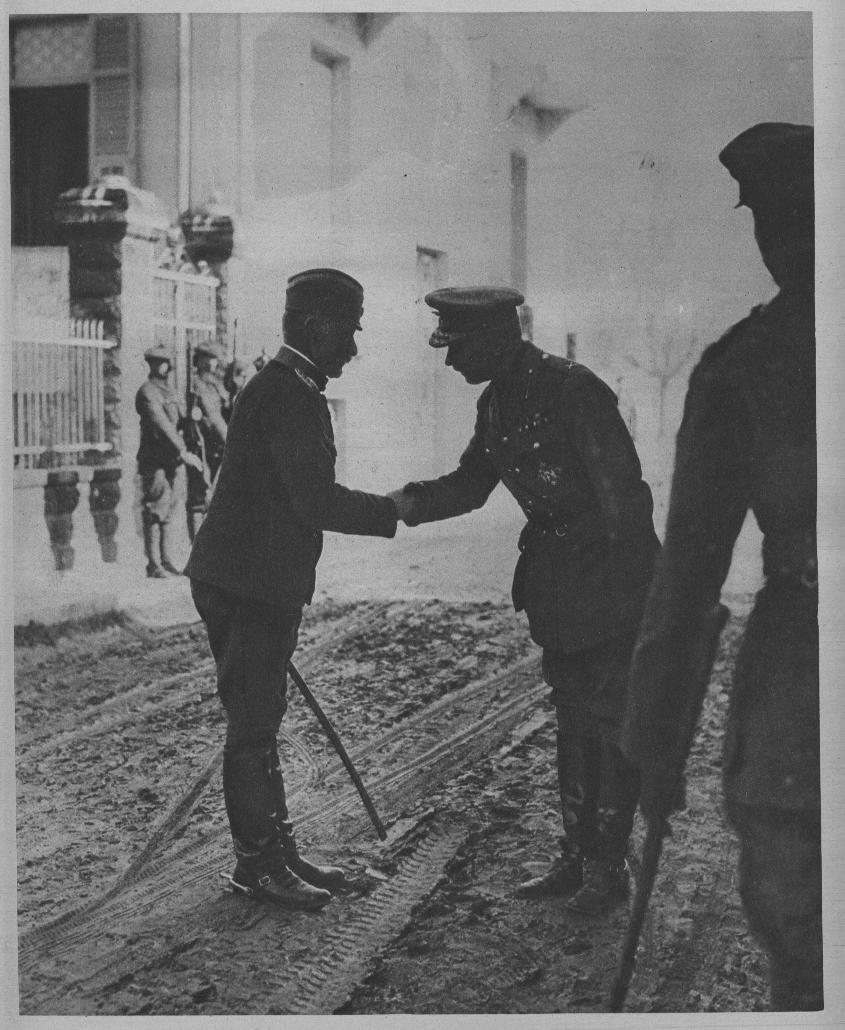
Field Marshal Mišić and British general George Milne

In the Balkan Wars, Mišić was the assistant chief of staff of the Supreme Command of vojvode Radomir Putnik, his right-hand man. After the Battle of Kumanovo of the First Balkan War, he was promoted to General. During the critical moments of the Bulgarian surprise offensive at the Battle of Bregalnica of the Second Balkan War, Mišić persuaded Putnik to order the army to repel the attack on the first line, thus contributing greatly to the Serbian victory in the battle.

During the July Crisis of 1914 Mišić effectively deputised for the ailing Putnik (then recuperating at a spa in Hungary). Defending against the Austro-Hungarian invasion of Serbia, Mišić (who had emerged from retirement to do so) was placed in command of the Serbian First Army; in December 1914, he won a decisive victory at the Battle of Kolubara that resulted in the humiliating expulsion of Austro-Hungarian forces from Serbia. He was subsequently promoted to the rank of Field Marshal in recognition of his efforts.

Although Mišić participated in the great retreat of the Serbian Army through the winter mountains of Albania during the winter of 1915–16, harried by the second combined German and Austro-Hungarian invasion force (ultimately joined by Bulgaria), he remained in favour of halting and making a final stand against Serbia's combined enemies. He was over-ridden however by both King Peter and the other Army commanders at a meeting in Peć, and was followed by the withdrawal of the Serbian army through Montenegro and Albania.

Having suffered badly from exposure during the epic retreat, Mišić recovered. At the Thessaloniki front in 1916, Mišić commanded the First Army, which stopped and forced the withdrawal of the Bulgarian army at the Battle of Gornicevo. Towards the end of the war in June 1918 Mišić was appointed Chief of the Supreme Command and commanded the Serbian army during the breakthrough of the Salonika front in September 1918. He was a lecturer at the Military Academy in Belgrade, and the end of his military career was greeted in 1918 with appointment as the Chief of General Staff of Army of The Kingdom of Serbs, Croats and Slovenes.

== Death and legacy ==
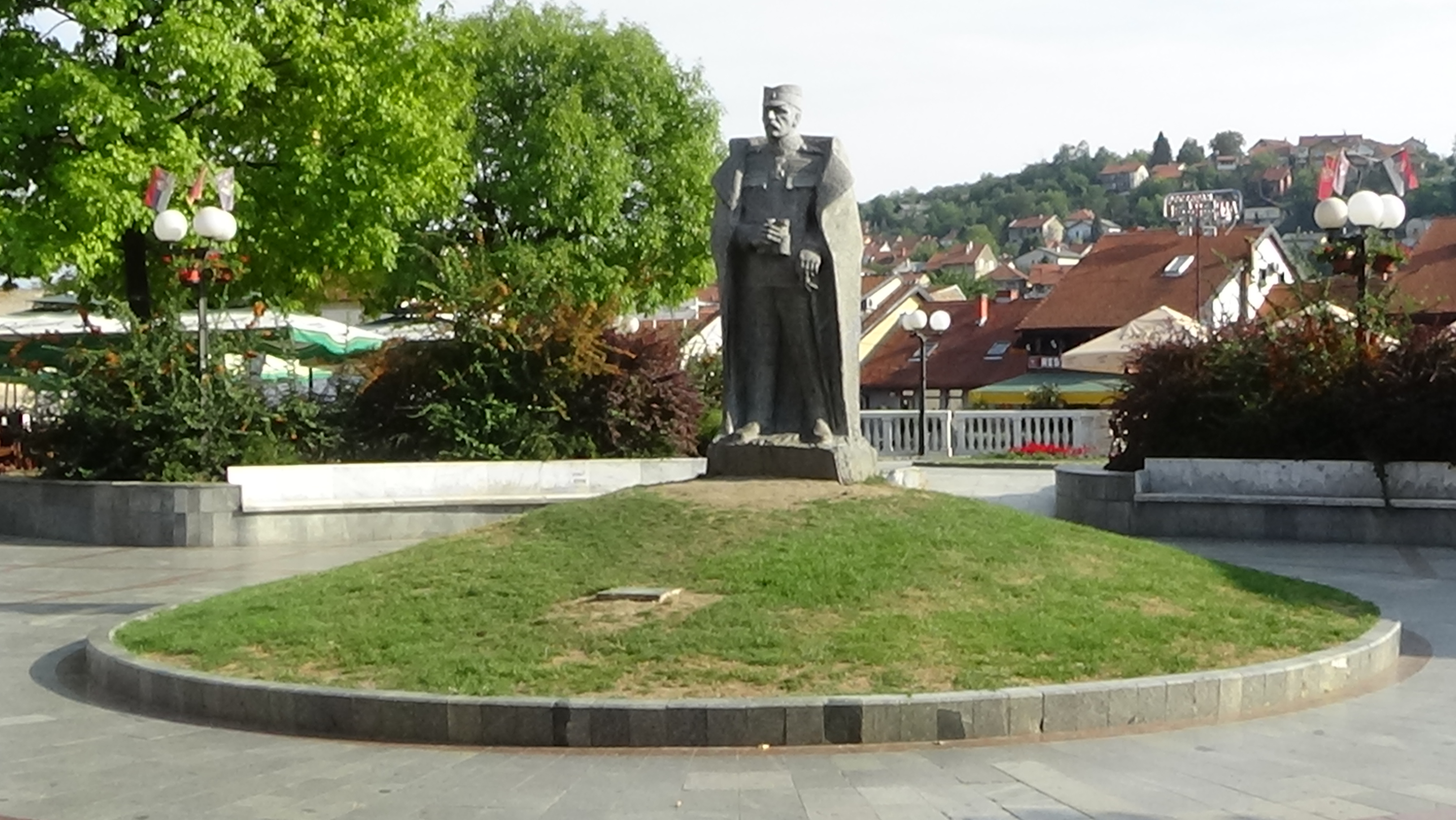
Živojin Mišić's statue in Valjevo

Mišić died in a Belgrade hospital of lung cancer in 1921.

During his hospitalization in France prior to his death Mišić began writing his memoirs, titled Moje uspomene ("My memories" in English). He managed to cover his entire life up to the start of the Second Balkan War but died before he could cover it and the First World War.

He is included in The 100 most prominent Serbs.

== Decorations ==
Serbian military decorations
Order of the Karađorđe's Star with Swords, Knight Grand Cross
Order of the Karađorđe's Star with Swords, Grand Officer
Order of the Karađorđe's Star with Swords, Commander
Order of the Karađorđe's Star with Swords, Officer
Order of Karađorđe's Star, Officer
Order of the White Eagle, Grand Officer
Order of the White Eagle, Officer
Order of the Cross of Takovo, Grand Officer
Order of the Cross of Takovo, Commander
Order of the Cross of Takovo with swords, Cavalier;
Serbian Service Medals
Medal of the Serbian Red Cross
Medal for Bravery, Gold
Medal for Bravery, Silver
Commemorative medal of the King Petar I
Commemorative medal of the wars with Turkey 1876-1878
Commemorative medal of the war with Bulgaria 1885
Medal for Military Merit
Medal for Devoted Service
Medal of Vidovdan
Commemorative Medal of the First Balkan War
Commemorative Medal of the Second Balkan War
Commemorative Medal of the First World War
Albanian Commemorative Medal
International and Foreign Awards
Order of St Michael and St George, Honorary Knight Grand Cross (United Kingdom)
Order of Franz Joseph, Knight's Cross (Austria-Hungary)
Legion of Honour, Grand-Croix (France)
Legion of Honour, Grand Officer (France)
Legion of Honour, Commandeur (France)
Legion of Honour, Officer (France)
Legion of Honour, Chevalier (France)
War Cross 1914–1918, Bronze palm (France)
Order of the Redeemer, Grand Cross (Greece)
Order of the Crown of Italy, Knight Grand Cross (Italy)
War Merit Cross (Italy)
Order of Prince Danilo I, Knight Commander (Montenegro)
Order of the Medjidie, II class (Ottoman Empire)
Order of the Medjidie, III class (Ottoman Empire)
Order of the Crown, Grand Officer (Romania)
Order of Saint Stanislaus, Grand Officer (Russian Empire)
Order of St. George, IV class (Russian Empire)
Order of the Bath, Knight Commander (United Kingdom)
Military Merit Cross (Austria-Hungary)
The Balkan war medal of the British Red Cross (United Kingdom)
Army Distinguished Service Medal (United States)
Medal for Highly Meritorius Service of the American Red Cross (USA)

== See also ==
- Petar Bojović
- Radomir Putnik
- Stepa Stepanović
- Božidar Janković
- Ilija Gojković
- Pavle Jurišić Šturm
- Ivan S. Pavlović

Military offices
Preceded by Petar Bojović	Chief of the General Staff; 1918	Succeeded by Army transformed
Preceded by Position established	Chief of the General Staff of Army of The Kingdom of Serbs, Croats and Slovenes; 1918–1921	Succeeded by Petar Bojović
