= Miševići (Nova Varoš) =

Miševići Мишевићи
- Village
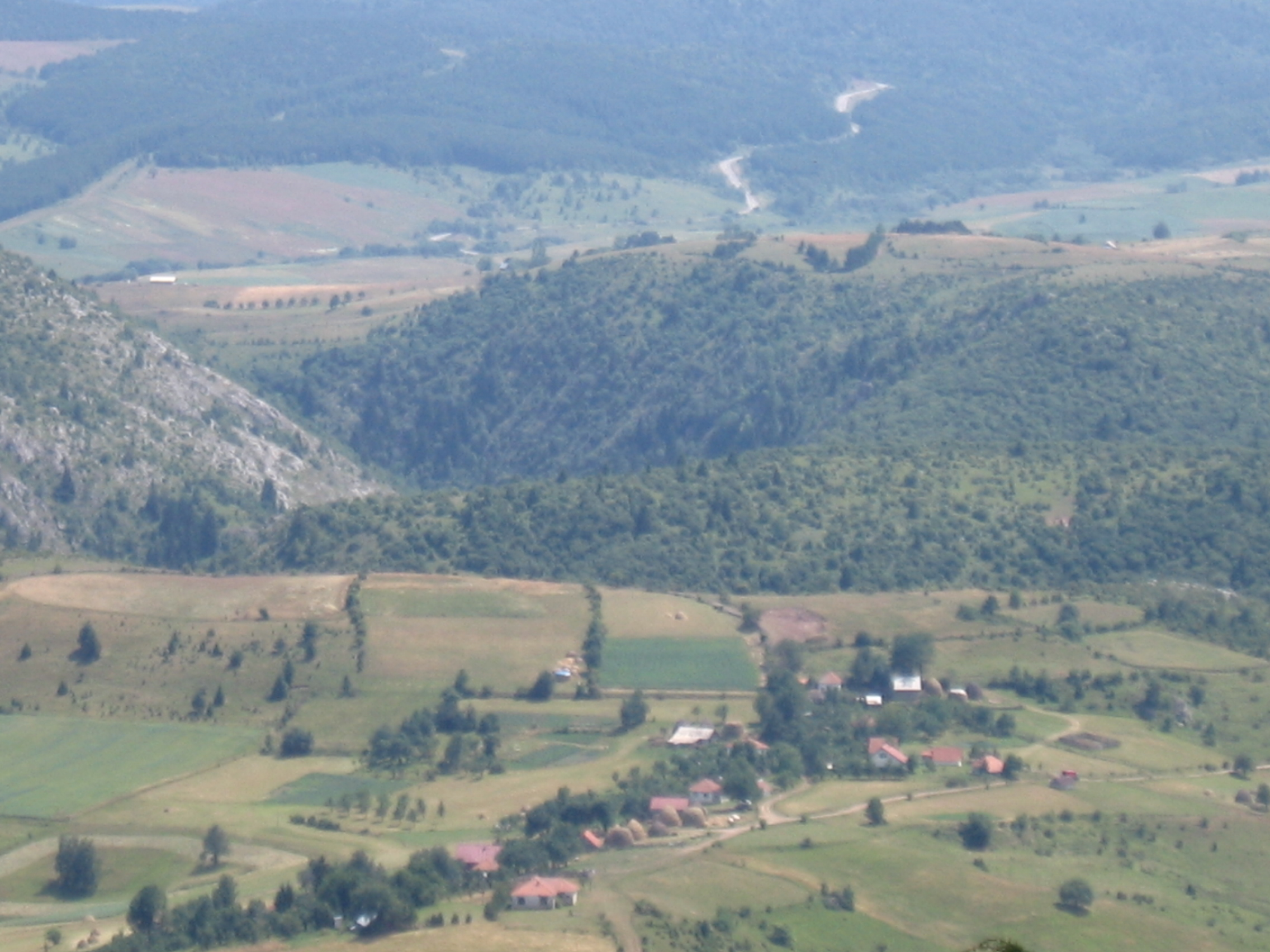

- Location within Serbia
- Coordinates: 43°21′N 19°53′E
- Country: Serbia
- Municipality: Nova Varoš
- Time zone: UTC+1 (CET)
  - Summer (DST): UTC+2 (CEST)

Miševići is a village situated in Nova Varoš municipality in Serbia.
