= Medal for Bravery (1912) =

Serbian medal

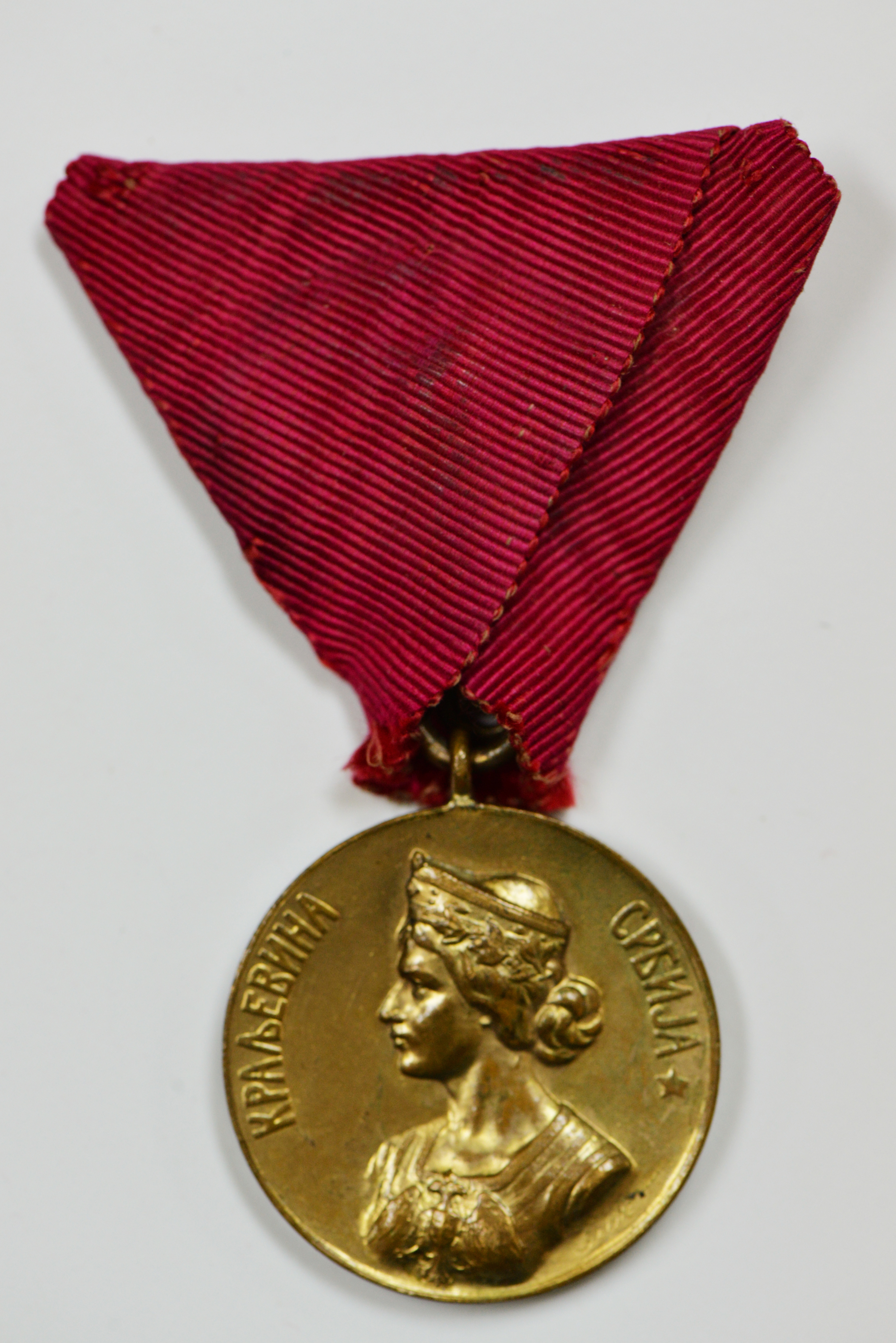
- Gold Medal for Bravery - first degree
- Type: Medal
- Awarded for: Personal courage on the battlefield
- Presented by: Kingdom of Serbia
- Eligibility: Military personnel
- Status: Discontinued
- Established: 14 November 1912
- First award: 1912
- Final award: 1913

Highlights
- Total: Unknown

Medal for Bravery (known as "Women's Medal") founded on 14 November 1912 by King Peter I, was granted to soldiers for acts of great personal courage, or for personal courage demonstrated on the battlefield during the First Balkan War against the Ottoman Empire. The medal is awarded in two degrees (gold and silver). The gold medal was worn on a red ribbon, while the silver medal was worn on a tricolor ribbon (red-blue-white, of equal width).

== Design ==
Đorđe Jovanović designed the original medal, which was later redesigned. The reason for replacement was that the original's obverse side represented Serbia with an allegorical female figure, which some officers felt diminished the award. The new model was adopted on 12 July 1913. The new medal's obverse depicted a Serbian medieval knight Miloš Obilić. Today, the original "Women's medal" is in demand by collectors worldwide, because it is very rare and it had a specific destiny. The "Women's Medal" is now especially important in feminist organizations.

== See also ==
- Medal for Bravery (Serbia)
