= Belgrade New Cemetery =

Cemetery in Belgrade, Serbia

New Cemetery
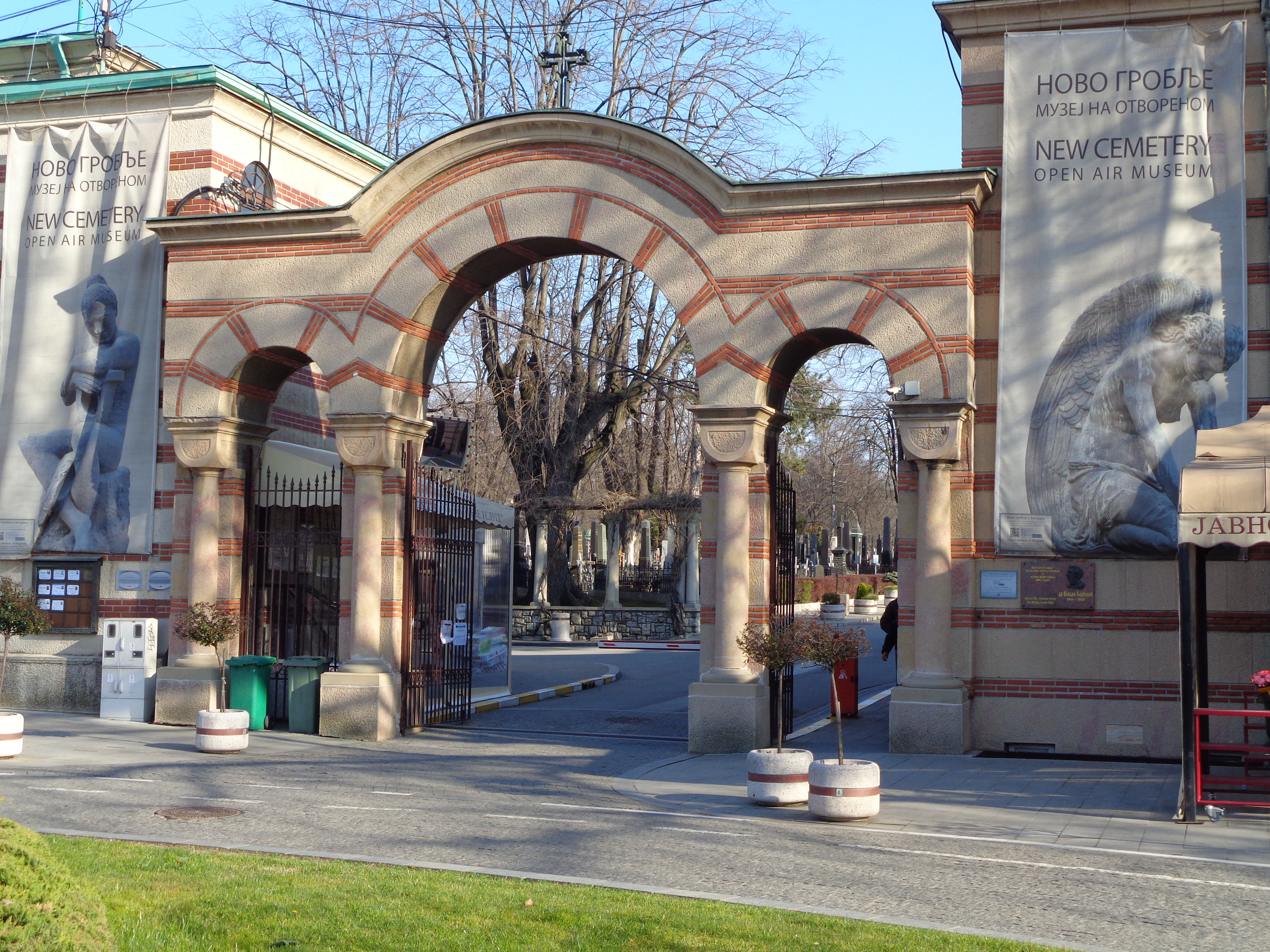
- The main entrance to the cemetery
- Interactive map of New Cemetery

Details
- Established: 16 August 1886
- Location: Zvezdara, Belgrade
- Country: Serbia
- Coordinates: 44°48′34″N 20°29′14″E
- Type: Christian
- Owned by: City of Belgrade
- Size: 30 ha (74 acres)
- Website: Guide through the New Cemetery

The New Cemetery (Serbian: Ново гробље, Novo groblje) is a cemetery complex in Belgrade, Serbia, with a distinct history. It is located in Ruzveltova street in Zvezdara municipality. The cemetery was built in 1886 as the third Christian cemetery in Belgrade and as the first architecturally and urbanistically planned cemetery in Serbia.

In addition to graves of ordinary citizens, the cemetery complex also includes special sections: military graves from Serbian-Ottoman War (1876–1877), Serbo-Bulgarian War, Balkan Wars and World Wars, the Alley of the Greats and the Alley of Distinguished Citizens, where some of the most important persons in the history of Serbia are buried. Two Jewish cemeteries (a Sephardic and an Ashkenazi one) are located adjacent to the New Cemetery, but are administrated separately.

== Location ==
The cemetery is located along the Ruzveltova (official seat, at No. 50) and Mije Kovačevića streets, which divide it in two sections, left or western, which is in the municipality of Palilula and right or eastern, which is in the municipality of Zvezdara. Larger, eastern section is bordered by the streets of Mije Kovačevića on the north, Severni bulevar on the east and Svetog Nikole on the south. North of this section are the neighborhoods of Bogoslovija and Stara Karaburma, Zvezdara II is on the east, while Slavujev Venac and Bulbulder are on the south. Smaller, western section is marked by the streets Čarlija Čaplina (northeast) and Preradovićeva (southwest). It is situated next to the neighborhood of Hadžipopovac.

== History ==
The first burials on the cemeteries that still exist today in the Belgrade's territory, were held in Zemun, at the end of the 18th century. However, the New Cemetery was the first which has been planned and projected specifically for this purpose, with all the infrastructure needed, so it is today considered to be the oldest of Belgrade's cemeteries. In 1886–2017 period, 340,000 people were buried.

As the city expanded, Belgrade's old cemetery at Tašmajdan became inadequate. On the one side, it became too small for the city's main graveyard. On the other, once projected to be on the outskirts of the city, as Belgrade grew, Tašmajdan practically became downtown and close to the Royal court. The first official initiative for the removal of the cemetery came in 1871 from Mihailo Jovanović, Metropolitan Bishop of Belgrade. As the city was in the financial crisis at the time and wasn't able to buy such a large lot for the new cemetery, mayor of Belgrade Vladan Đorđević donated a patch of his land to the city for the purpose of establishing a new cemetery. In the next decades, the area, including the graveyard itself was known as Vladanovac (after the mayor), but gradually was replaced with the name New Cemetery. Mayors Živko Karabiberović and Mijailo Bogićević also worked on the establishment of the cemetery. The cemetery was charted in the city plans in 1884 but the citizens originally disapproved the new location, as it was distant from downtown, so a horse-operated tram line was established, Terazije-New Cemetery. The adaptation of the lot was finished on 16 August 1886 and the first person was buried next day. It was Dragutin Dimić, son of the cemetery gardener Veljko Dimić. The graveyard originally covered 2 ha (4.9 acres), but by 2017 grew to 30 ha (74 acres). The reinterment of the remains from the Tašmajdan dragged on for the several decades, being finished only in 1927.

First memorial monument was built in 1907, when remains of the Serbian soldiers who died in wars against the Turks and Bulgarians in the 19th century were reinterred from the Tašmajdan. During the bombardment of Belgrade in the World War I, cemetery was damaged in 1915. In the Interbellum, seven military graveyards were also formed together with the Memorial Ossuary to the Defenders of Belgrade 1914–1918.

=== After 1945 ===
Cemetery of Belgrade Liberators, for the soldiers who died in 1944, extension across the Ruzveltova street to the west, was built in 1954. In 1959, a memorial cemetery for all the fallen fighters of the World War II was built by the architects Bogdan Bogdanović and Svetislav Ličina. Ličina also projected the Alley of Distinguished Citizens in 1965. In 1963, the crematory was opened. Though the first initiative for the crematory to be built came in 1904 from the "Oganj" society, and Minister for Public Health Čedomir Mihajlović approved construction in 1928, due to the lack of space, funds and opposition of the public, it took decades to open one. It is on the spot where the old Ashkenazi chapel was located. In 1964, the first year the crematory was operational, there were only 6 cremations, 5 of which were organized for the foreign citizens.

By the 1983 decision of the National Assembly of Serbia, the New Cemetery was declared as the cultural monument of great importance. Since 2004 it is member of the Association of Significant Cemeteries of Europe and since 2018 of the European Cemeteries Route.

== The Main (Eastern) portion ==
The main part of the complex, on the right side of the Ruzveltova street, consists of a small Ashkenazi Jewish cemetery and much larger Christian cemetery. The Christian cemetery contains graves of ordinary citizens, several military graveyards, and four memorial sections containing the graves of important persons: the Arcades, the Alley of the Greats, the Alley of Distinguished Citizens, and the Alley of People's Heroes.

Among the headstones, there are 1,597 which are works of art by 130 Serbian sculptors, thus the cemetery is considered as the "museum in the open". Artists who contributed to this "museum" with their works include Ivan Meštrović, Đorđe Jovanović, Toma Rosandić, Sreten Stojanović, Petar Palavičini, Nebojša Mitrić, Risto Stijović, Živojin Lukić, Simeon Roksandić, Roman Verkhovskoy, Olga Jevrić, Oto Logo, Petar Ubavkić, Lojze Dolinar, Stevan Bodnarov and Nikola Janković.

Some of the specific, important works include:

- A statue of the girl in the crinoline dress on the parcel of merchant and benefactor Joca Jovanović Šapčanin; work of Italian sculptor Achille Canessa.
- The Muses of literature and painting on the family tomb of Matija Ban, his daughter Poleksija Todorović and her husband Stevan Todorović.
- The oldest reliefs in the cemetery are done by Đorđe Jovanović for the tomb of Andra Nikolić. Some of the reliefs represent Nikolić's four younger children, who all died of diphtheria. A broken column was sculptured on the tomb itself, marking the death of Dušan, Nikolić's older son who survived through infancy but was killed in World War I, on the Suvobor mountain during the Battle of Kolubara in 1914.

=== Church of Saint Nicholas ===
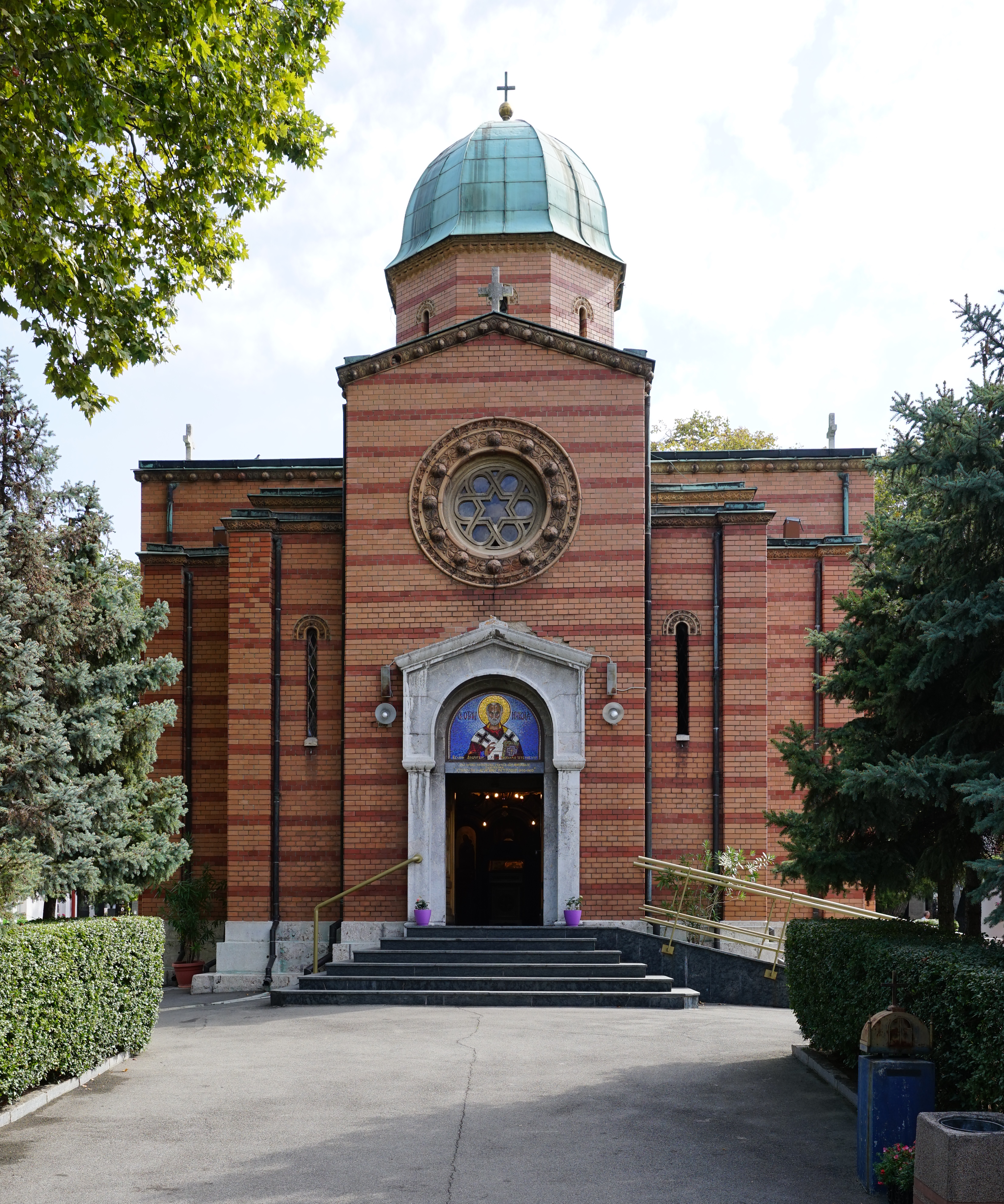
The Church of St. Nicholas at the cemetery

The newly developed cemetery had no chapel or church, so by the endowment of Draginja and Stanojlo Petrović, a church dedicated to Saint Nicholas, projected by the architect Svetozar Ivačković was built in 1893. The iconostasis was painted by Stevan Todorović and his wife Poleksija. The frescoes are a work of Andrea Domenico, on the draft by Petar Ranosović. The Petrović couple is buried in the church's crypt, with their 5-year-old son Petar.

For a long time, the church also served for the parochial services, until the Church of Saint Lazar was built in the neighborhood of Bulbulder. In that period, weddings and baptisms were also performed in the church, while the public fairs were held in front of it.

=== Military graveyards ===
The oldest memorial at Novo groblje complex is the Serbian soldiers' ossuary built in 1907 which contains remains of the soldiers of Serbian-Ottoman Wars (1876–1878) and Serbo-Bulgarian War (1885) that were transferred from Tašmajdan cemetery.

Important part of the complex are the military graveyards with the remains of soldiers from the Balkan Wars and World War I. It contains remains of Serbian and other Allied soldiers, as well as Central Powers soldiers. Beside the Serbian ossuary (Memorial Ossuary to the Defenders of Belgrade), there are separate French, Russian, Italian, Austro-Hungarian and Bulgarian military graveyards. The Russian Military Graveyard contains graves of over 3,000 Russian White émigrés who arrived to Yugoslavia after the 1917 Russian Revolution and the ensuing civil war. They include priests, soldiers and some important names in science and culture, who fled Bolshevik rule. At the edge of the Russian graveyard are the monumental "Russian Glory" memorial ossuary and the Iverskaya chapel. The Chapel was designed in 1931 by Valery Vladimirovich Stashevsky, a replica of the original chapel in Moscow which the Bolsheviks demolished that same year.

There is also a British (Commonwealth) graveyard from World War II. The Commonwealth War Graves Commission maintain the Commonwealth graves. The Alley of the People's Heroes is located around the Serbian ossuary. It contains graves of 312 persons, 118 of whom were the People's Heroes of Yugoslavia. The complex also includes graveyards of the victims of 1941 and 1944 Bombings of Belgrade, and the Alley of Executed Patriots 1941–1944.

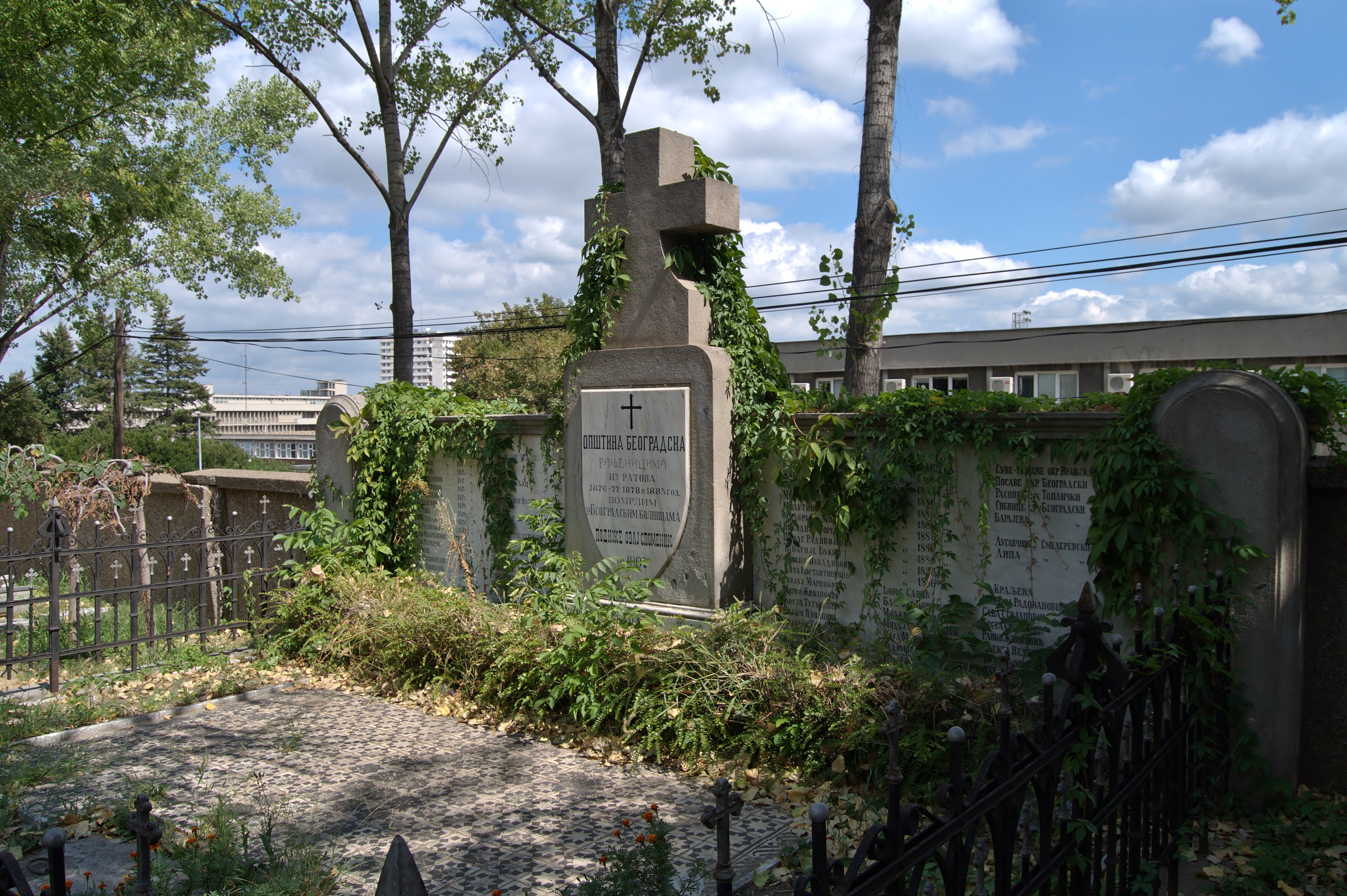
Monument at the Military graveyard of the Serbian-Ottoman Wars (1876–1878)

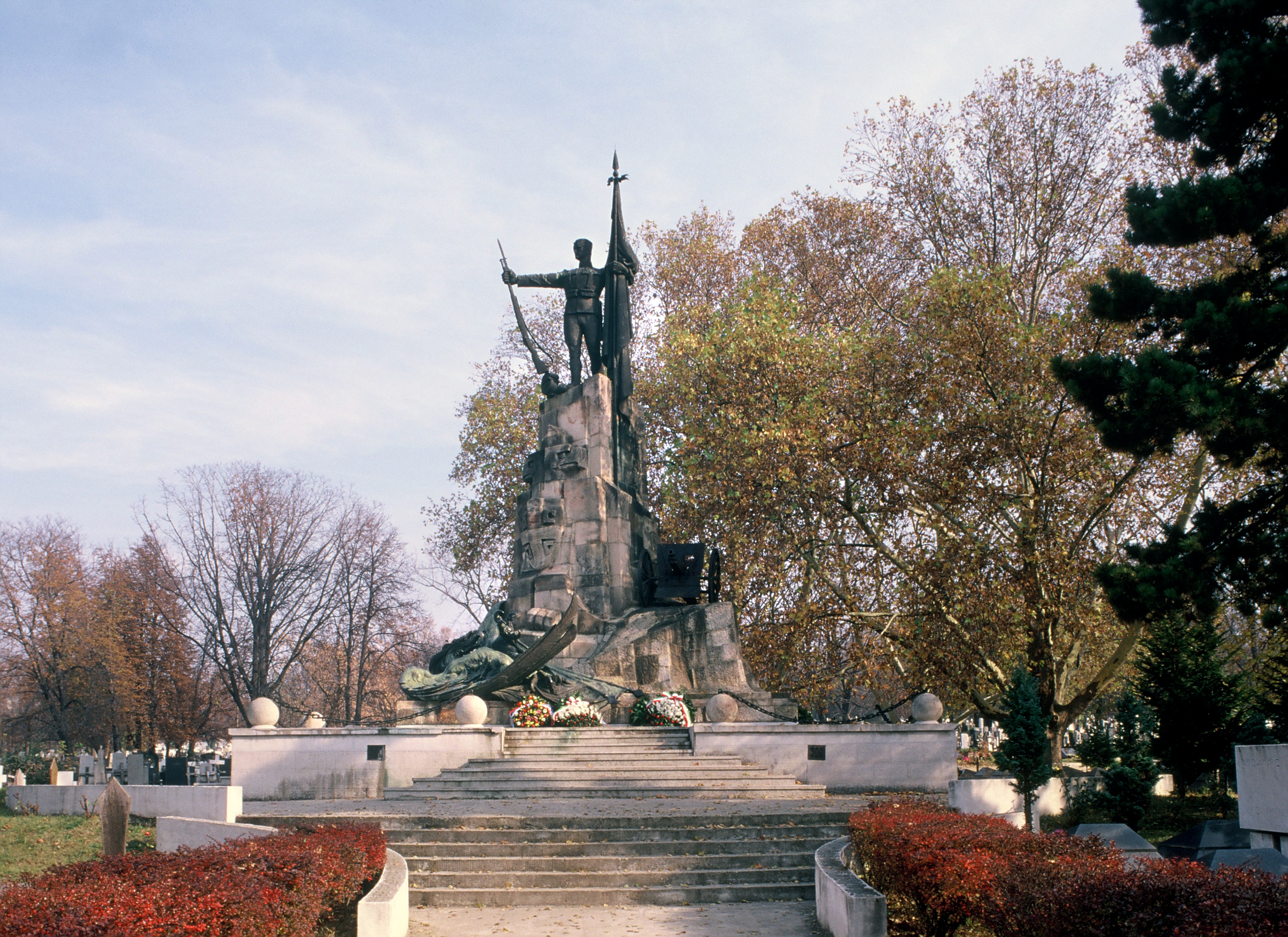
Memorial Ossuary to the Defenders of Belgrade 1914–1918 with the Alley of the People's Heroes around it.

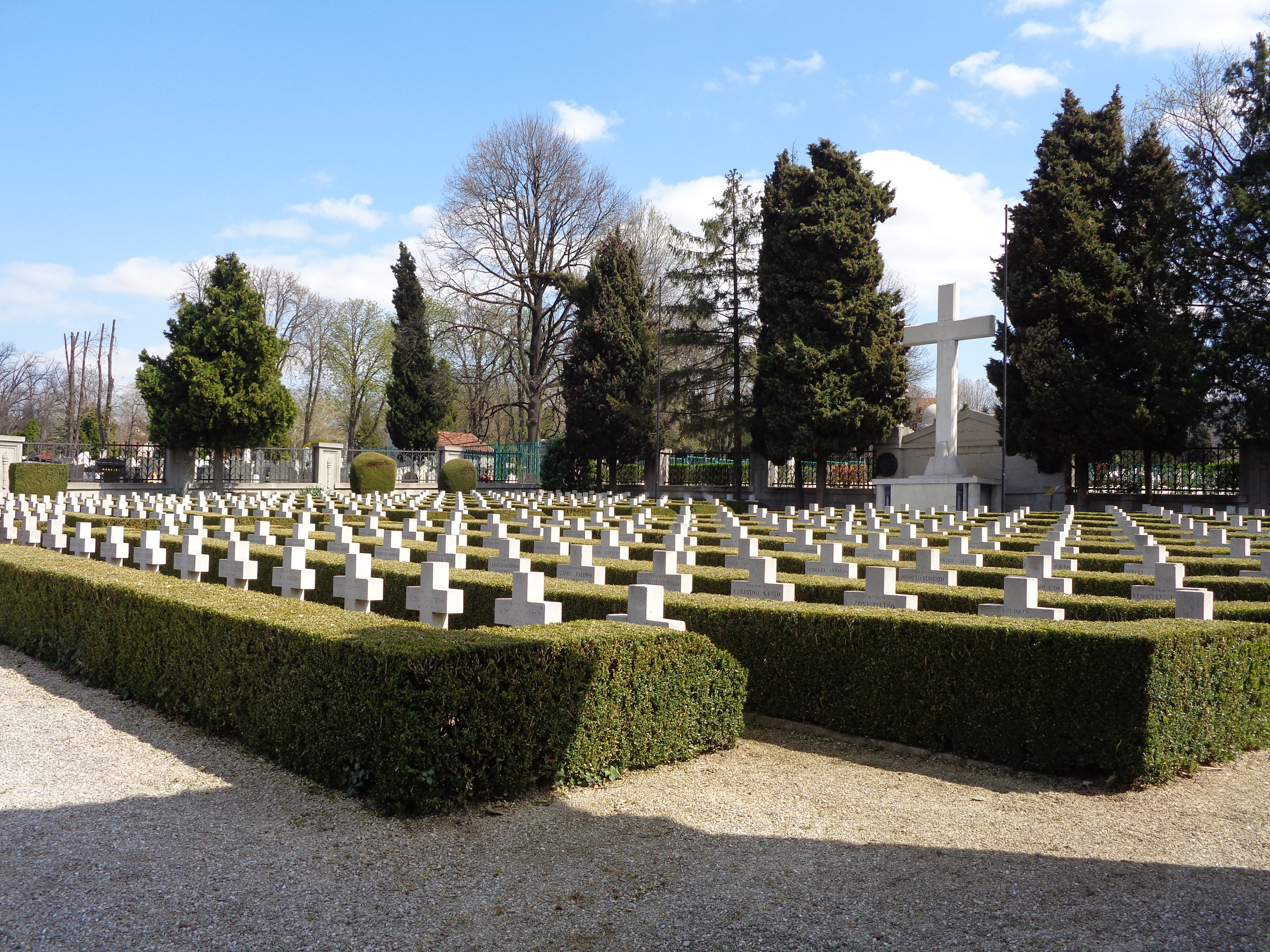
Italian WWI military graveyard

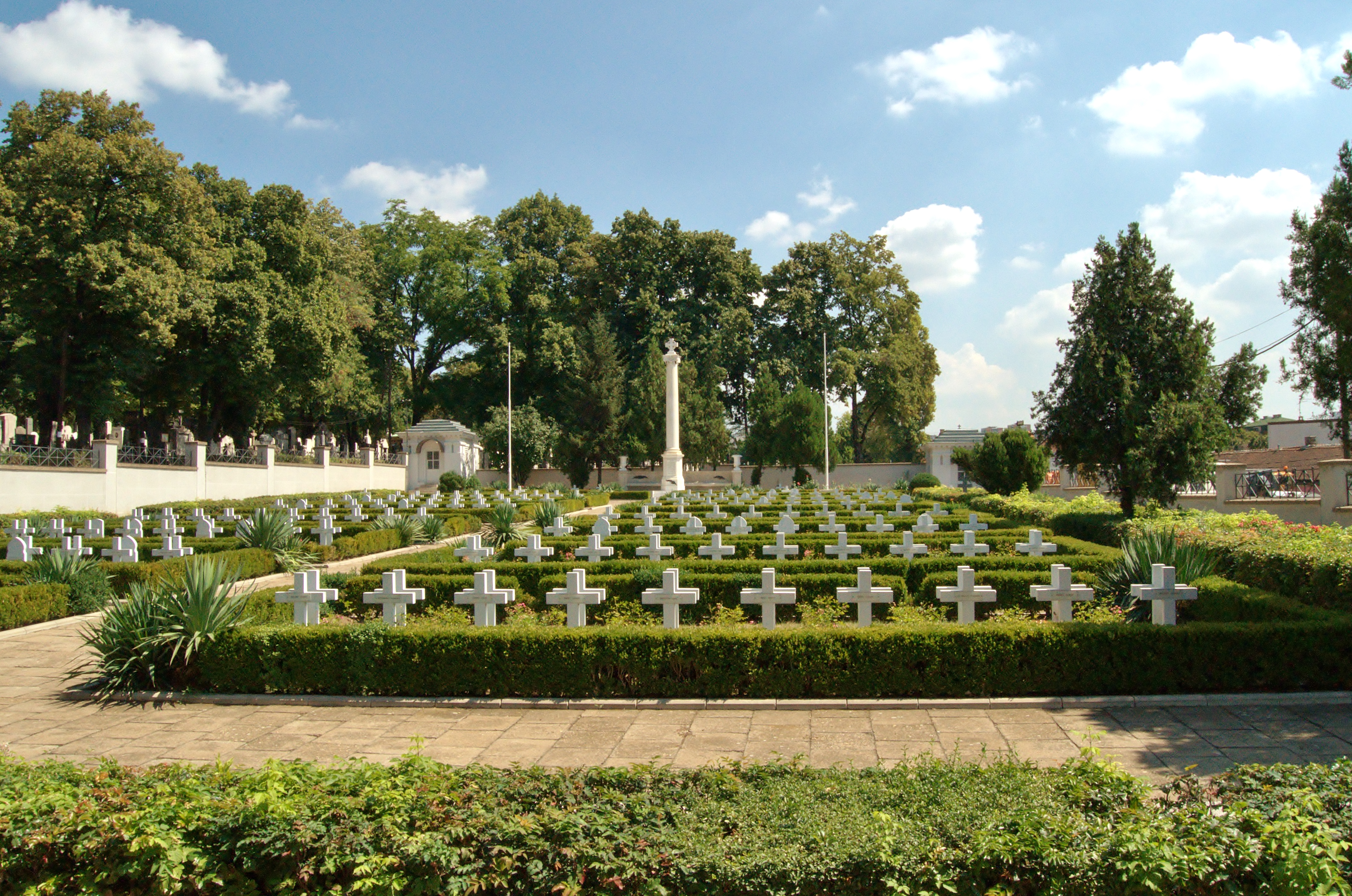
French WWI military graveyard

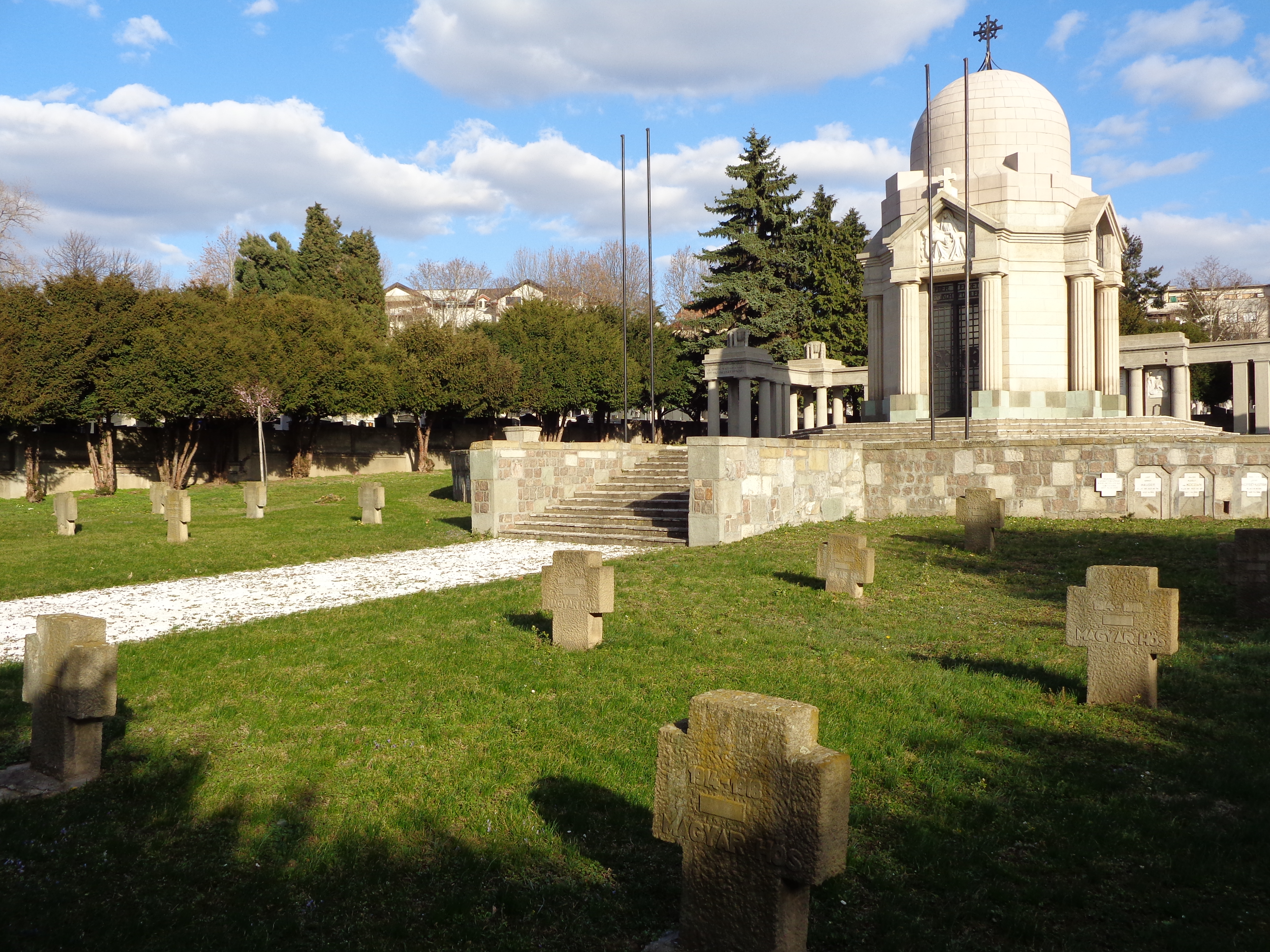
Austro-Hungarian WWI military graveyard

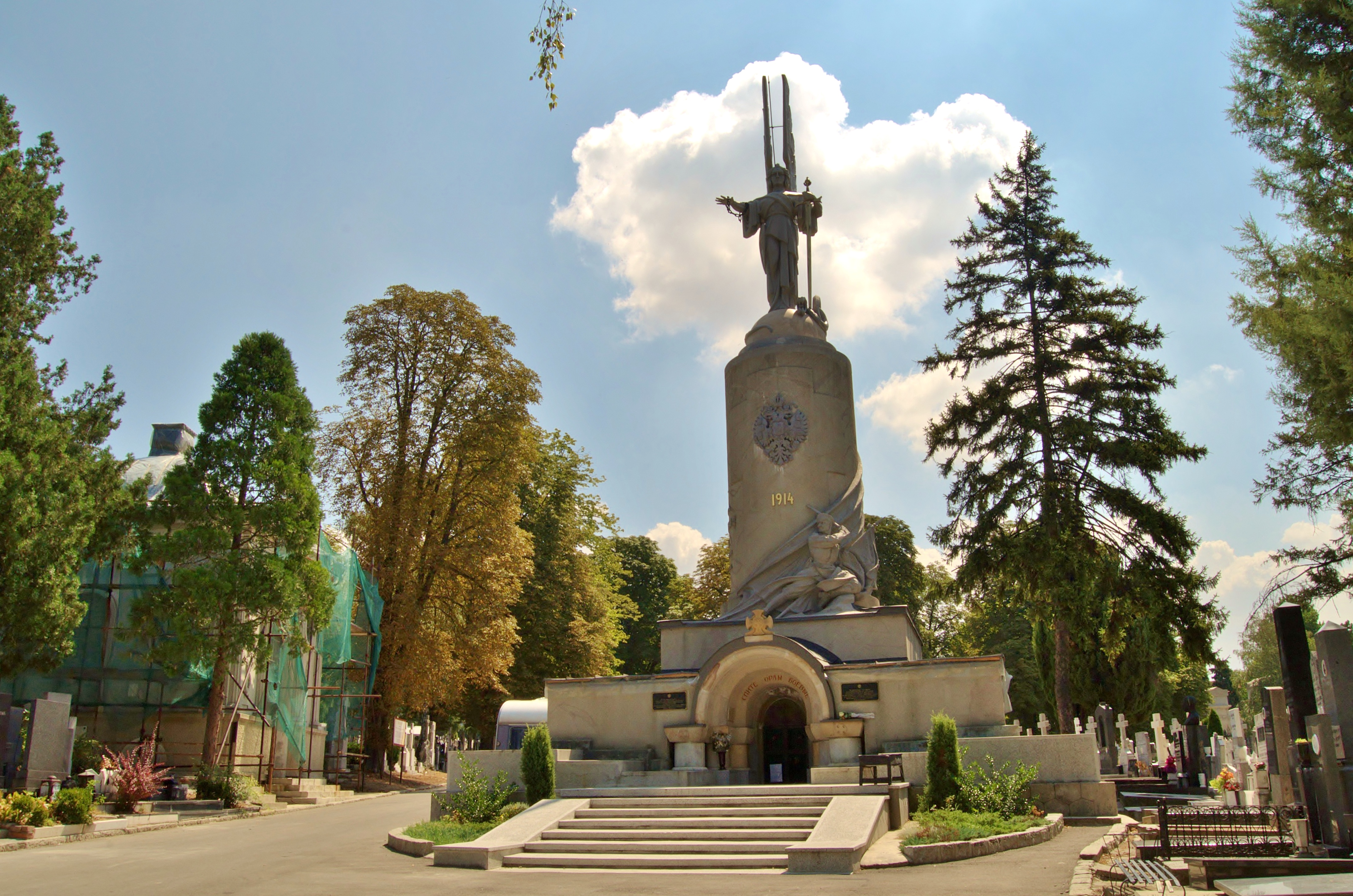
Russian Ossuary

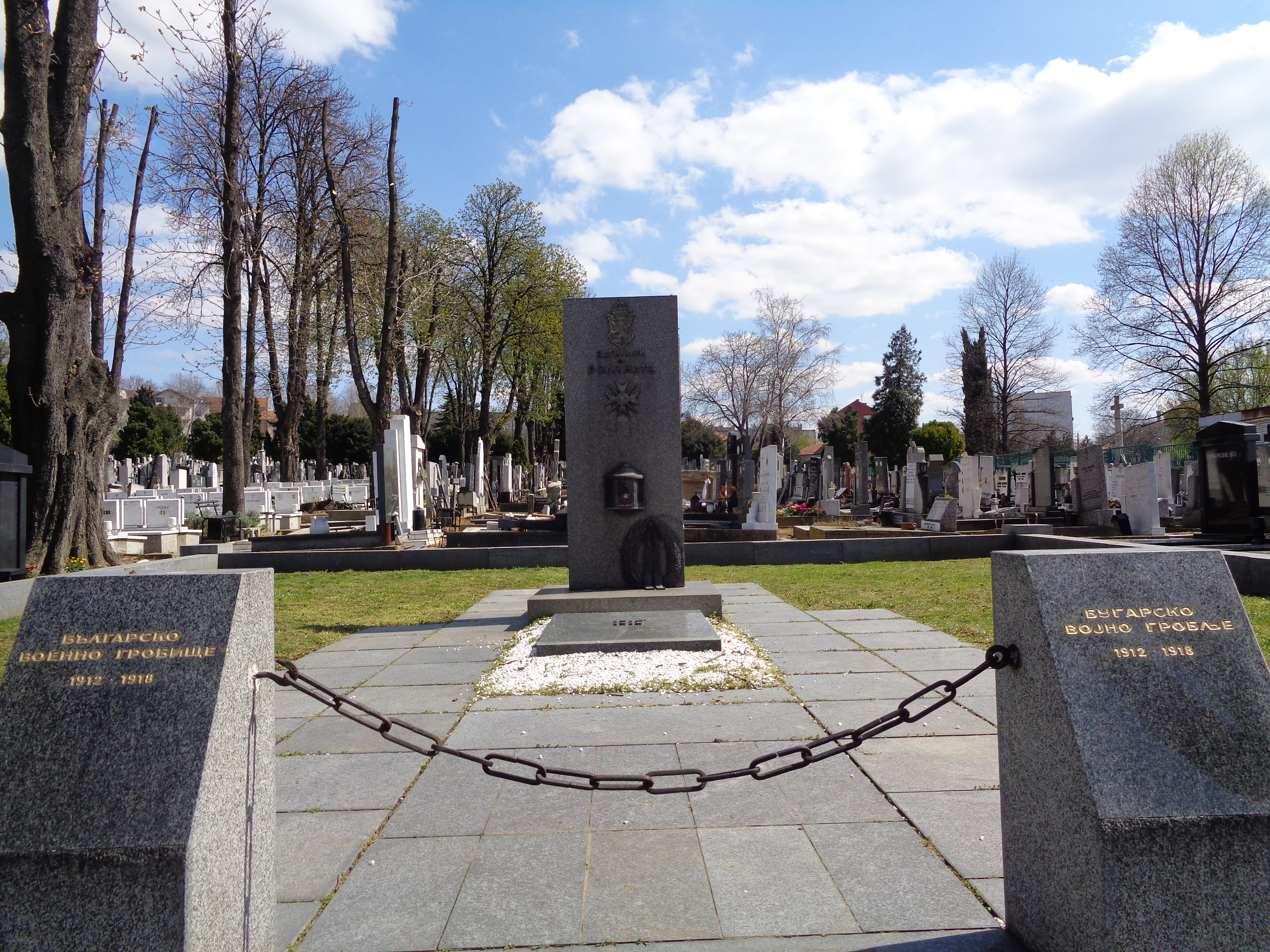
Bulgarian WWI Military Graveyard

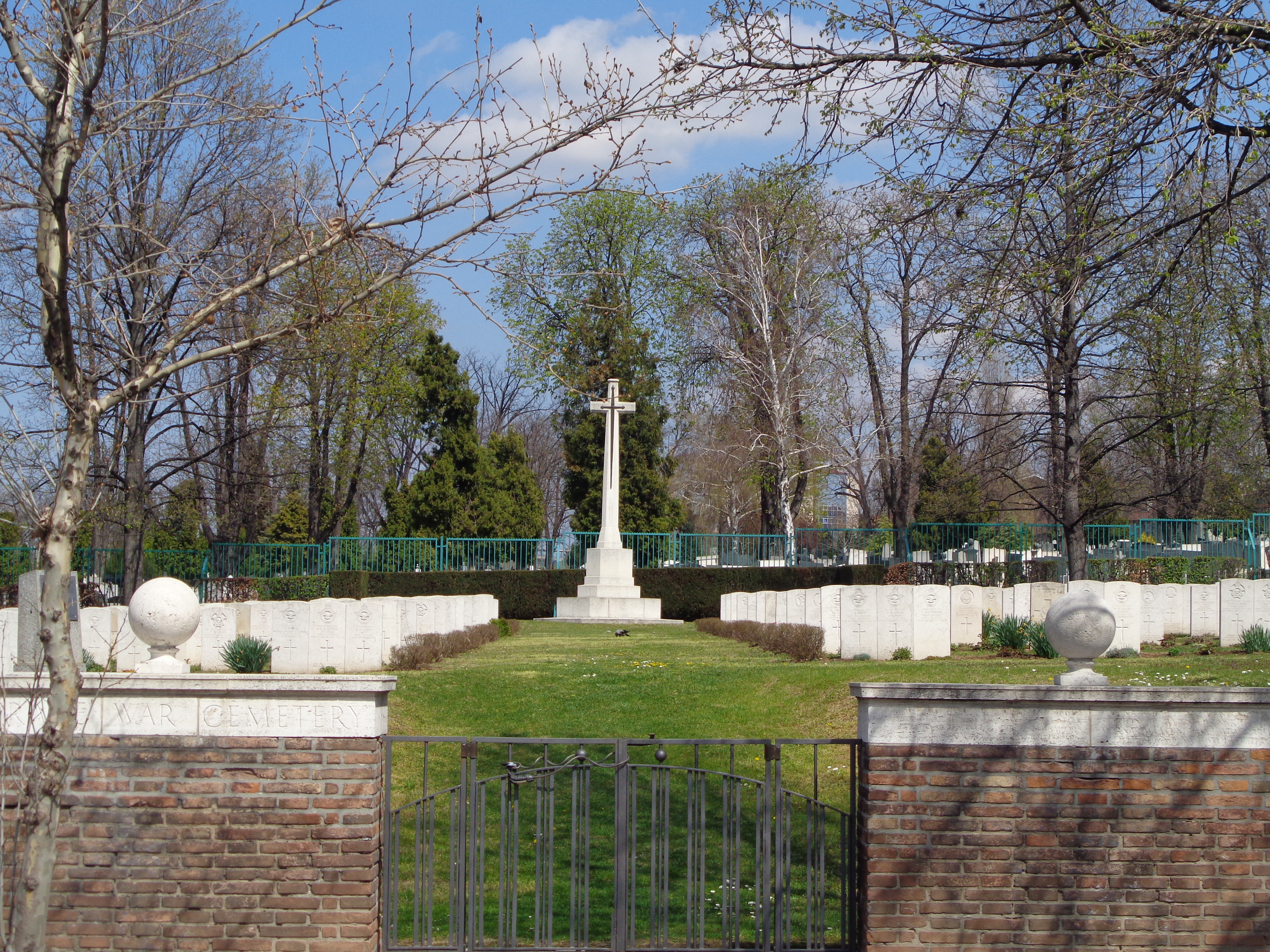
British WWII military graveyard

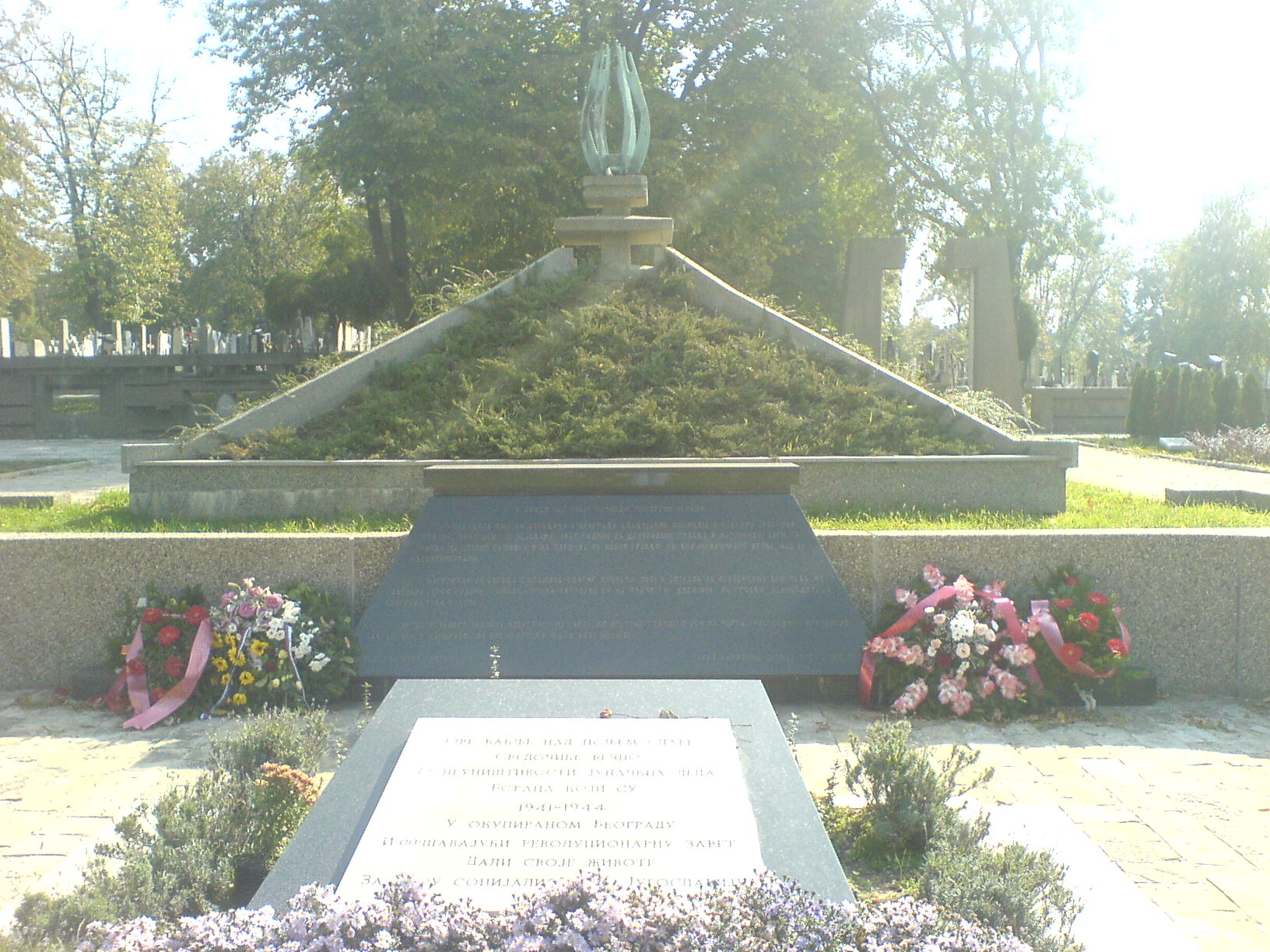
The Alley of Executed Patriots 1941–1944

=== Arcades ===
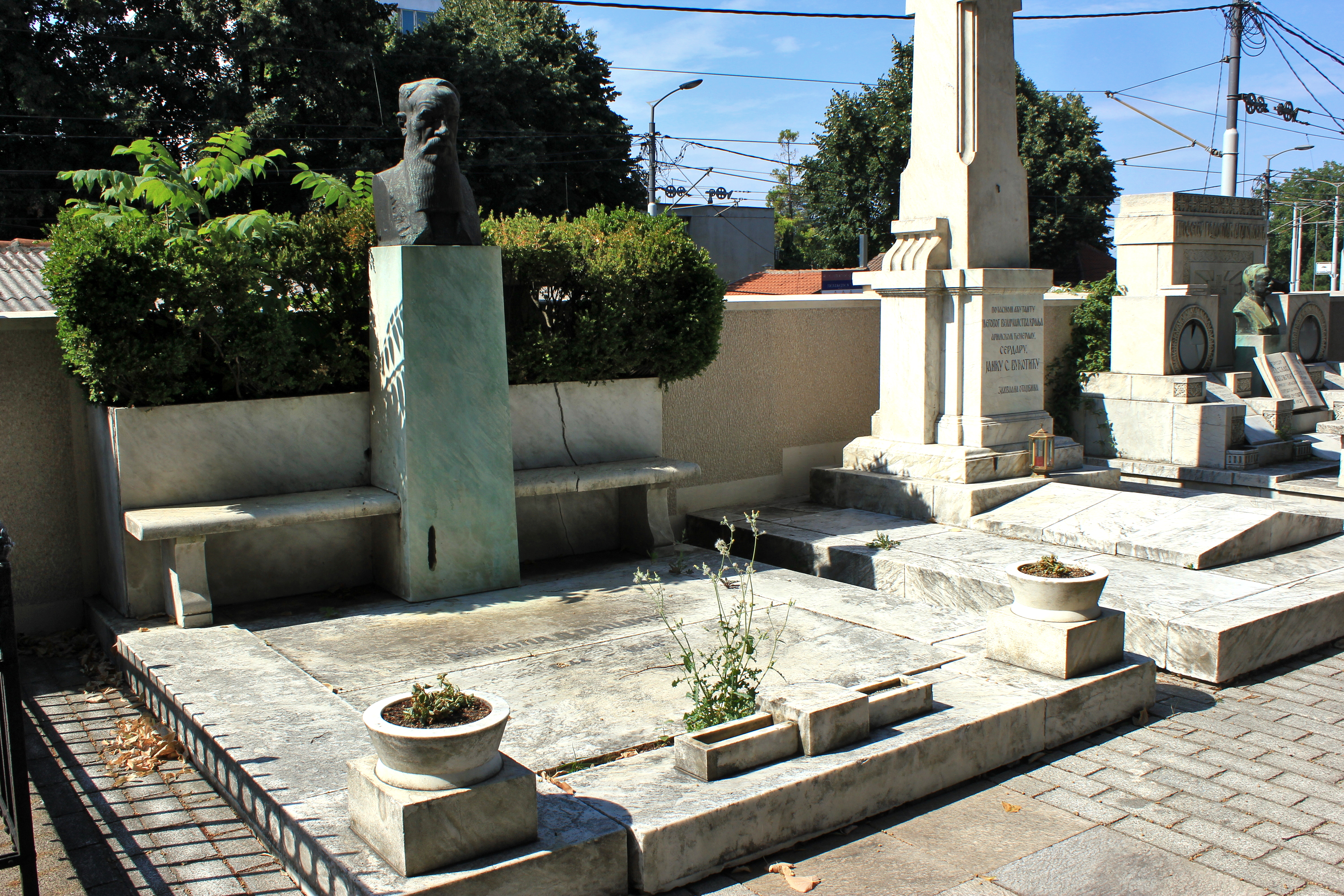
The Aracades section with the graves of Nikola Pašić and Janko Vukotić

Though this section is next to the wall, it was originally envisioned as a series of arches ("arcades"). Eventually, arcades remained only as ornamental and architectural part of the outer wall of the cemetery. The section was built in 1926–1927, concurrently with the Alley of the Greats. It contains tombs of important public figures and wealthier citizens, as the lots in this section were not given to the commoners. Here are the graves of Milenko Vesnić (1863–1921), politician and diplomat, Nikola Pašić (1844–1926), politician, Janko Vukotić (1866–1927), general and politician, Sreten Stojanović (1898–1960), sculptor, Svetlana Velmar-Janković (1933–2014), writer.

==== Alley of the Greats ====
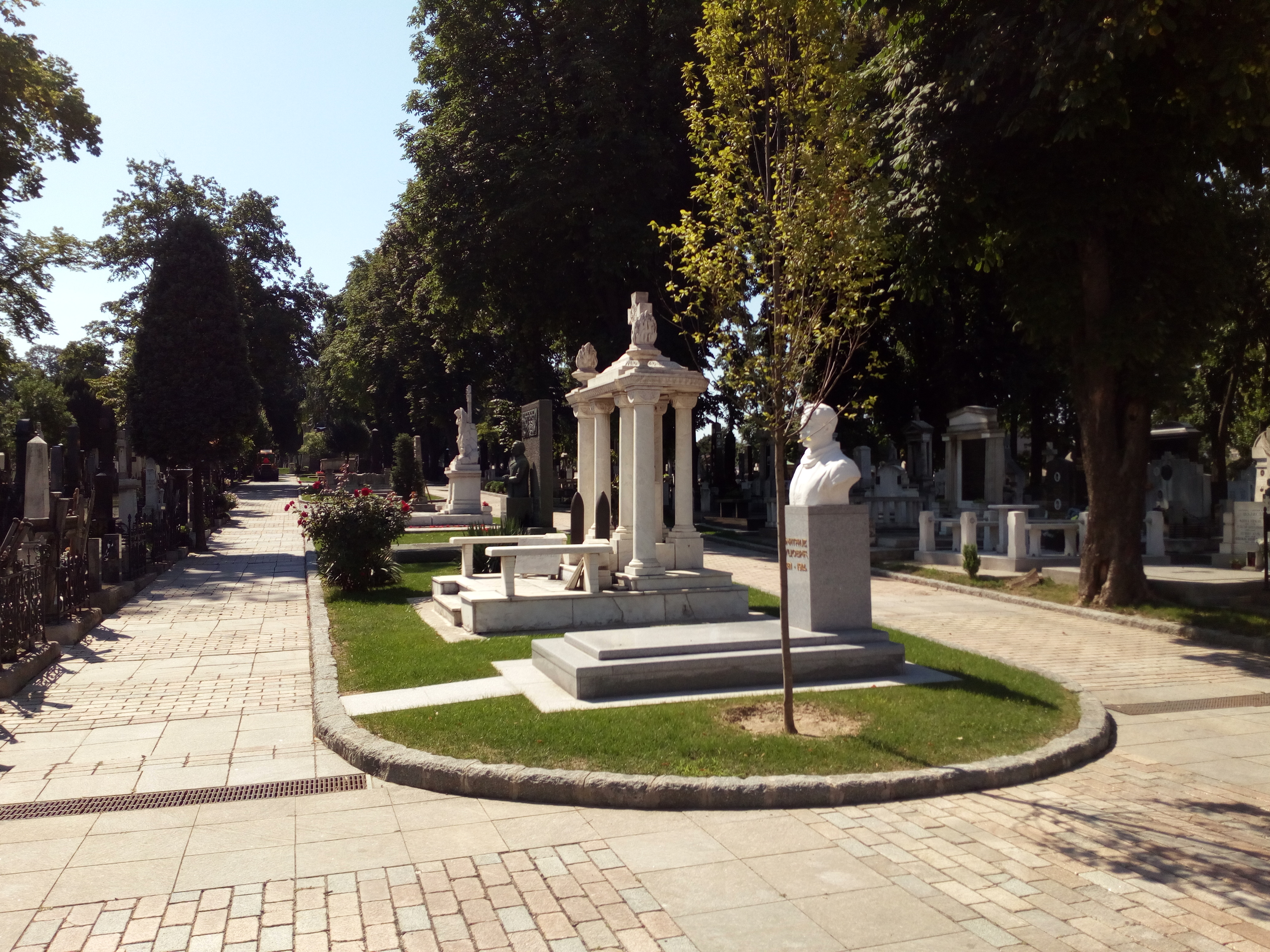
Alley of the Greats, the grave of Dimitrije Tucović is visible.

Alley of the Greats (Serbian: Алеја великана, Aleja velikana) was created in the 19th century with a transfer of the remain of several important persons from the Tašmajdan Cemetery to the New Cemetery. As an architectural unit, it was formed in 1926–1927 as the first lot specifically designed for the nationally important people. It contains 25 tombs and 3 chapels with 113 buried people by 2017. Some of the people buried at the Alley of the Greats are:

- Milan Kujundžić Aberdar (1842–1893), philosopher and politician
- Jovan Cvijić (1865–1927), geographer
- Kosta Hristić (1852–1927), diplomat and writer
- Stevan Hristić (1885–1958), composer
- Slobodan Jovanović (1869–1958), philosopher and politician
- Stevan Vladislav Kaćanski (1829–1890), poet
- Petar Kočić (1877–1916), writer
- Ilija Milosavljević Kolarac (1789–1878), donator
- Živojin Mišić (1855–1921), fieldmarshal
- Branislav Nušić (1864–1938), comedy playwright
- Jovan Popović (1905–1952), writer and revolutionary
- Radomir Putnik (1847–1917), fieldmarshal
- Milunka Savić (1892–1973), female soldier
- Kornelije Stanković (1831–1865), composer
- Velimir Mihailo Teodorović (1849–1898), benefactor and out-of-wedlock son of Prince Mihailo Obrenović
- Dimitrije Tucović (1881–1914), socialist leader
- Miloš Vasić (1859–1935), general and weapons constructor

Kolarac, Kaćanski and Aberdar were reinterred from the old Tašmajdan cemetery. Jovanović was exhumed from his London grave and reinterred in 2011. Savić was reinterred from her family tomb on the cemetery in 2013, while the remains of Tucović were moved from the Slavija Square in December 2016, during the square's reconstruction. The three chapels belong to Teodorović, the family of Stevan Hristić and the Spužić family.

==== Alley of Distinguished Citizens ====
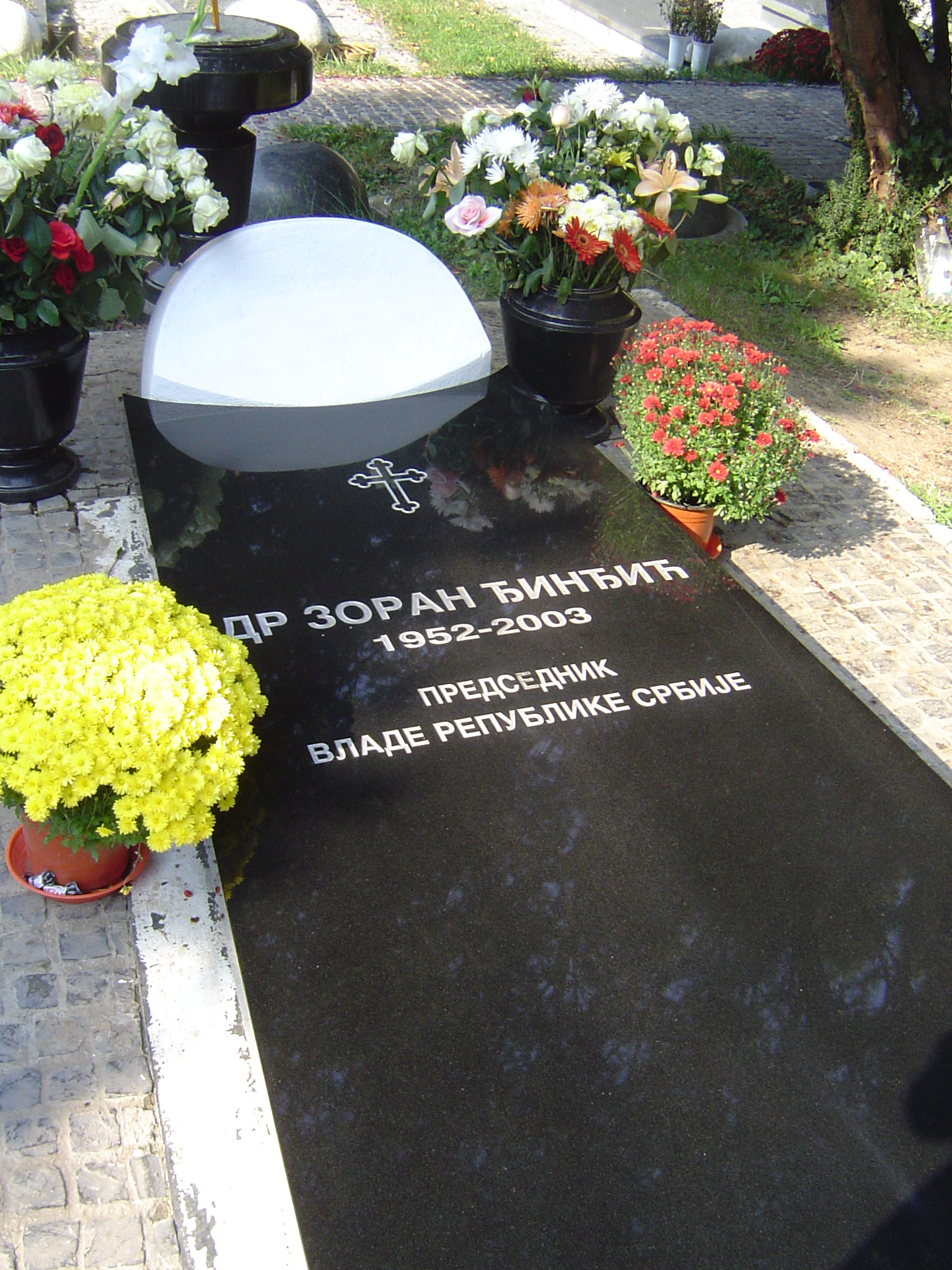
Tomb of Zoran Đinđić at the Alley of Distinguished Citizens

The Alley of Distinguished Citizens (Serbian: Алеја заслужних грађана, Aleja zaslužnih građana) was created in 1965, and it has since been used for the burials of distinguished and important citizens. Prior to the burial, a special procedure must be completed and approval from the City Assembly of Belgrade and Mayor of Belgrade must be granted. It contains single and group tombs of important writers, artists, actors, singers, generals, people's heroes and other important persons. It occupies the central part of the cemetery.

Though the first deceased were transferred to the Alley from other cemeteries starting in 1965, the first person buried directly in the Alley was Branko Jevremović, judge of the Constitutional Court of Yugoslavia, on 28 April 1969. On average, 16 persons per year were buried, but the authorities lifted this number in the late 2010s (23 in 2019, 25 in 2020), including more people from the entertainment industry and those close to the ruling establishment, which caused some protests. By 2021, 800 people were buried in total, leaving only 30 empty lots. In March 2021, expansion of the alley with further 95 tombs and 104 urn slots was announced, but also the construction of another alley at the New Bežanija Cemetery, under the name of Alley of the Distinguished Belgraders.

Some of the people buried at the Alley of Distinguished Citizens are:

- Mira Alečković (1924–2008), poet
- Mija Aleksić, (1923–1995), actor
- Ivo Andrić (1892–1975), writer and Nobel Prize winner
- Stojan Aralica (1883–1980), painter
- Isidora Bjelica (1966–2020), writer
- Stjepan Bobek (1923–2010), footballer
- Ljubinka Bobić (1897–1978), actress
- Nenad Bogdanović (1954–2007), Mayor of Belgrade
- Miodrag Bulatović (1930–1991), writer
- Branislav Crnčević (1933–2011), writer and politician
- Miloš Crnjanski (1893–1977), poet, author, and a diplomat
- Branko Ćopić (1915–1984), writer
- Oskar Danon (1913–2009), composer and conductor
- Oskar Davičo (1909–1989), writer
- Milena Dravić (1940–2018), actress
- Zoran Đinđić (1952–2003), Prime Minister of Serbia
- Rahela Ferari (1911–1994), actress
- Jelena Genčić (1936–2013), tennis and handball player and coach
- Svetozar Gligorić (1923–2012), chess player
- Nebojša Glogovac (1969–2018), actor
- Sanja Ilić (1951–2021), musician and composer
- Olja Ivanjicki (1931–2009), painter and sculptor
- Bora Ivkov (1933–2022), chess player
- Paja Jovanović (1859–1957), painter. The urn with his ashes was transferred here after his wife's death.
- Slobodan Jovanović (1869–1958), historian, lawyer, literary critic and politician
- Momo Kapor (1937–2010), writer and painter
- Danilo Kiš (1935–1989), writer
- Radivoj Korać (1938–1969), basketball player
- Miodrag Kostić (1959–2024), businessman
- Voki Kostić (1931–2010), composer
- Petar Kralj (1941–2011), actor
- Nikola Ljubičić (1916–2005), General of the Army, Minister of Defence of Yugoslavia, President of Serbia
- Petar Lubarda (1907–1974), painter
- Dragan Lukić (1928–2006), poet
- Đorđe Marjanović (1931–2021), singer
- Olivera Marković (1925–2011), actress
- Rade Marković (1921–2010), actor
- Milić od Mačve (1934–2000), painter
- Milorad Bata Mihailović (1923–2011), painter
- Milo Milunović (1897–1967), painter
- Žika Mitrović (1921–2005), movie director and screenwriter
- Rrahman Morina (1943–1990), communist politician
- Kosta Nađ (1911–1986), Yugoslav Partisan Army general
- Dragan Nikolić (1943–2016), actor
- Bata Paskaljević (1923–2004), actor
- Milorad Pavić (1929–2009), writer and literary historian
- Borislav Pekić (1930–1992), writer
- Vasko Popa (1922–1991), poet
- Koča Popović (1908–1992), Partisan Army general, Chiefs of the General Staff of the Yugoslav People's Army, Foreign Minister, Vice President of Yugoslavia
- Zoran Radmilović (1933–1985), actor
- Dušan Radović (1922–1984), journalist and writer
- Džej Ramadanovski (1964–2020), singer
- Jovan Rašković (1929–1992), psychiatrist and politician
- Radmila Savićević (1926–2001), actress
- Meša Selimović (1910–1982), writer
- Ružica Sokić (1934–2013), actress
- Mladen Srbinović (1925–2009), painter
- Bojan Stupica (1910–1970), theater and film director
- Šaban Šaulić (1951–2019), singer
- Ivan Tabaković (1898–1977), painter
- Ljuba Tadić (1929–2005), actor
- Vlasta Velisavljević (1926–2021), actor
- Matija Vuković (1925–1985), sculptor
- Stevo Žigon (1926–2005), actor and director
- Velimir Bata Živojinović (1933–2016), actor (in 2020 reinterred to his birthplace, Koraćica)
- Miloš Žutić (1939–1993), actor

=== Family tombs ===
Important people from Serbian history, culture and science have been buried in their individual or family tombs. They include:

- Uzun-Mirko Apostolović (1782–1868), military commander
- Matija Ban (1818–1903), author and diplomat
- Petar Bojović (1858–1945), fieldmarshal
- Ilija Čarapić (1792–1844), mayor of Belgrade
- Ilija Garašanin (1812–1874), politician
- Aleksandar Deroko (1894–1988), architect
- Jevrem Grujić (1826–1895), politician
- Katarina Ivanović (1811–1882), painter
- Đura Jakšić (1832–1878), poet and painter
- Vladeta Jerotić (1924–2018), psychiatrist
- Pavle Jurišić Šturm (1848–1922), general
- Andra Nikolić (1853–1918), academic and politician
- Nadežda Petrović (1873–1915), painter
- Jovan Ristić (1831–1899), politician
- Stevan Todorović (1832–1925), painter
- Stanislav Vinaver (1891–1955), author

=== Ashkenazi Jewish cemetery ===
Adjacent to the main complex of the New Cemetery, there is a small Jewish Ashkenazi cemetery. It is located directly across the street from the larger Sephardic Jewish Cemetery. It is known for its sculptures, including the "Kiss of death" by Toma Rosandić, on the tomb of Jakov and Ruža Klopfer. The Ashkenazi cemetery, founded in 1876, is closed for further expansion as there is no room left.

== The Western portion ==
This part of the complex consists of a memorial military graveyard and a Sephardic Jewish cemetery, on the left side of the Ruzveltova street.

=== Cemetery of Belgrade Liberators ===
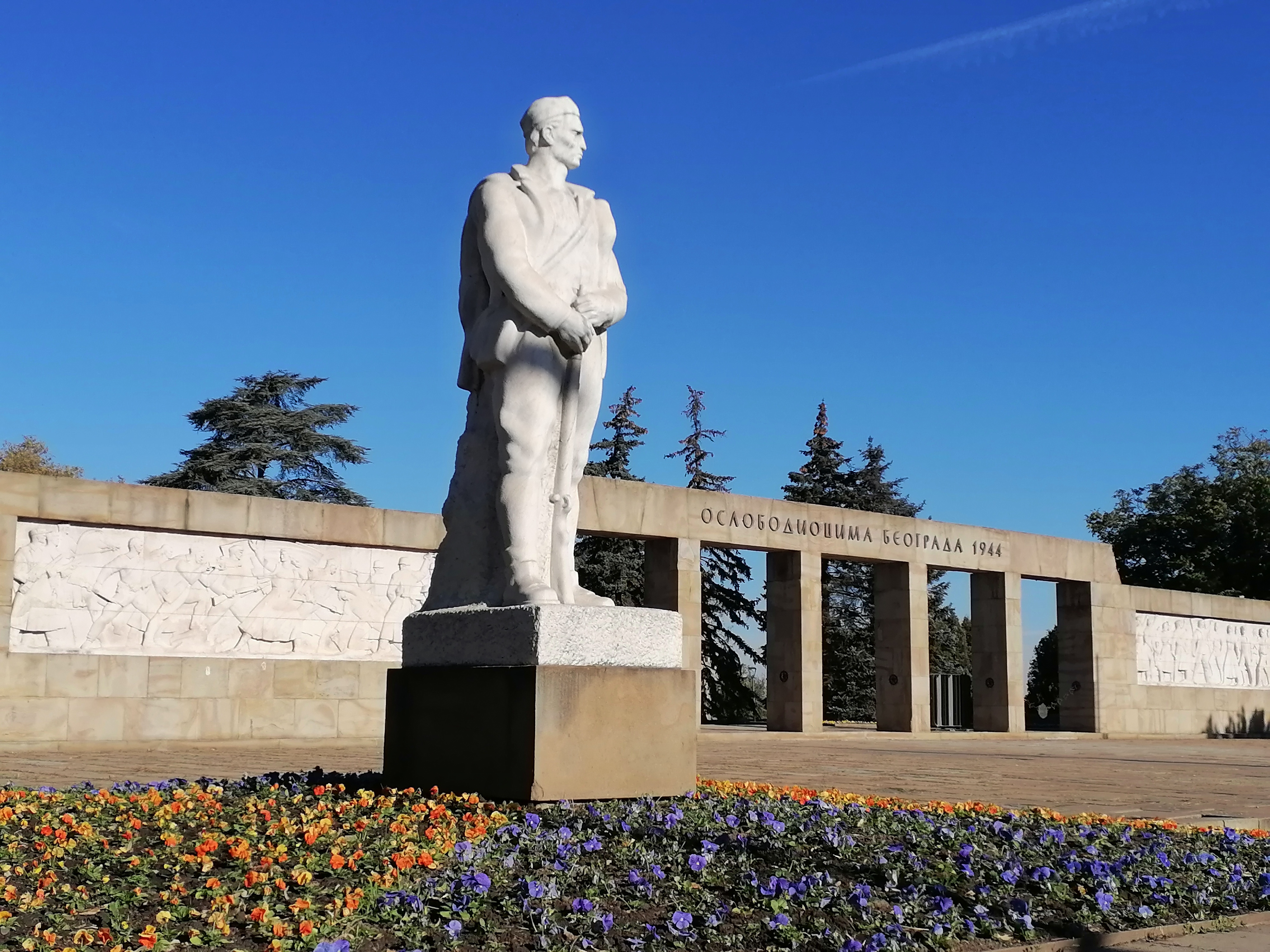
Liberators of Belgrade memorial with the entrance to the Cemetery of Belgrade Liberators behind.

During the Belgrade Offensive, in which the Partisans and the Red Army expelled occupying Germans from Belgrade on 20 October 1944, 24 Red Army tank crewmen were killed. On 23 October 1944, a funeral procession consisting of 24 tanks moved from the Slavija Square to the Republic Square, where the crewmen were buried. In 1954 the crypt and the monument, so as the remains of all the other soldiers, were moved to the Belgrade New Cemetery and the Cemetery of Belgrade Liberators has been formed. Officially opened on 20 October 1954, to mark the 10th anniversary of the liberation of Belgrade, the design of the complex became a blueprint for numerous other memorial sites in Yugoslavia.

Cemetery of Belgrade Liberators (Гробље ослободилаца Београда / Groblje oslobodilaca Beograda), though part of the cemetery complex, is located on the other (western) side of the street, across from the main part of the Belgrade New Cemetery. It contains graves of 2,944 National Liberation Army soldiers and 961 Red Army soldiers and the mass grave of 1,381 National Liberation Army soldiers and 711 Red Army soldiers who died during the Belgrade Offensive.

The cemetery includes Liberators of Belgrade memorial with the monumental gates covered in reliefs by sculptor Rade Stanković and the "Red Army Soldier" sculpture by Antun Augustinčić. Stanković also sculptured a statue of Partisan holding a gun in front of the memorial, named "Combatant on eternal watch". The complex was the first memorial complex built in Belgrade after World War II. It was designed by architect Branko Bon and horticultural engineer Aleksandar Krstić. In its own right, the Cemetery of Belgrade Liberators was declared a cultural monument in 1987.

The cemetery was partially renovated in 2019, celebrating 75 years of World War II liberation. A three-colored decorative lights were placed, white, blue and red, in the colors of both Serbian and Russian flags. The colorful lights on the cemetery of the killed soldiers wasn't received well by the public.

During his visit to Belgrade in February 2020, Russian Minister of Defence Sergey Shoygu brought a pot of Russian earth from Saint Petersburg, which was poured at the location of the Eternal Flame, also marking the beginning of its construction. The sculptural-architectural composition is work of the Russian sculptor Andrey Tyrtyshnikov. It is the second memorial named Eternal Flame in Belgrade, after the 2000 memorial erected in the Park of Friendship in New Belgrade. Opening was planned for 26 March, during the visit of the Russian foreign minister Sergey Lavrov to Serbia. This was all postponed due to the COVID-19 pandemic. In September 2020 it was announced that the memorial will be opened by the end of the year. On 14 December 2020, the flame was lit from the eternal flame at the Tomb of the Unknown Soldier in Moscow and transported to Belgrade by the Russian Defence ministry's plane. It was lit the next day, in the presence of Serbian president Aleksandar Vučić and minister Lavrov.

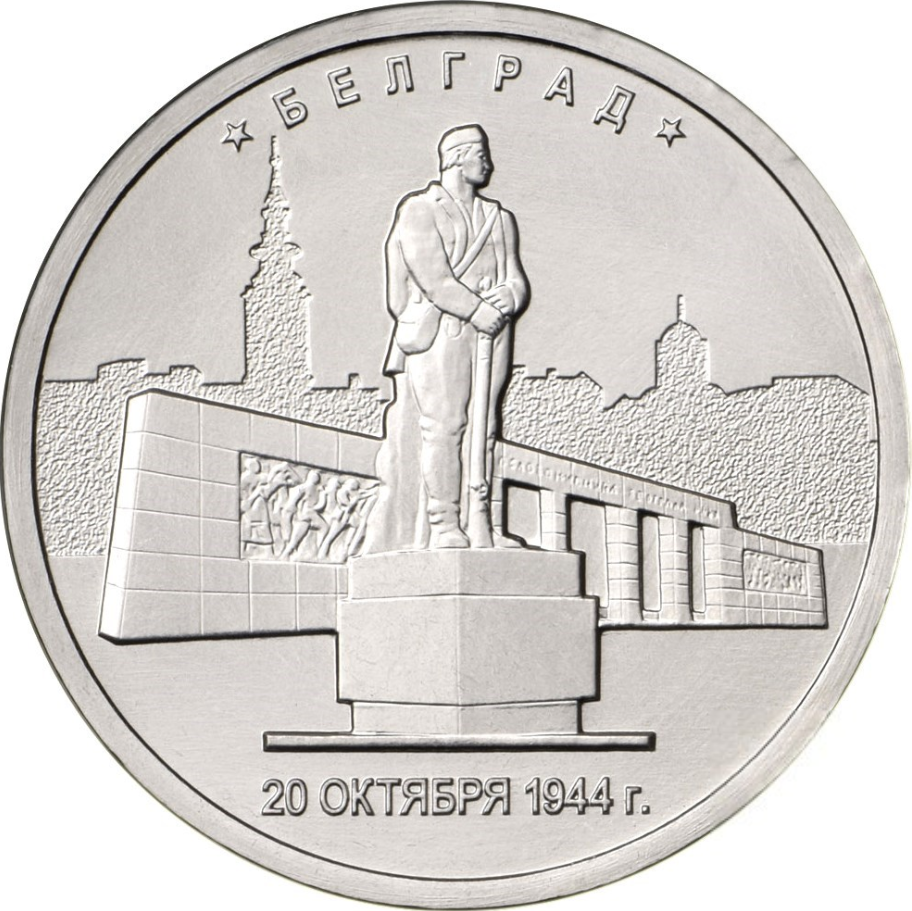
Russian coin in 2016 , the top says BELGRADE and the bottom says 20 OCTOBER 1944

=== Sephardic Jewish cemetery ===
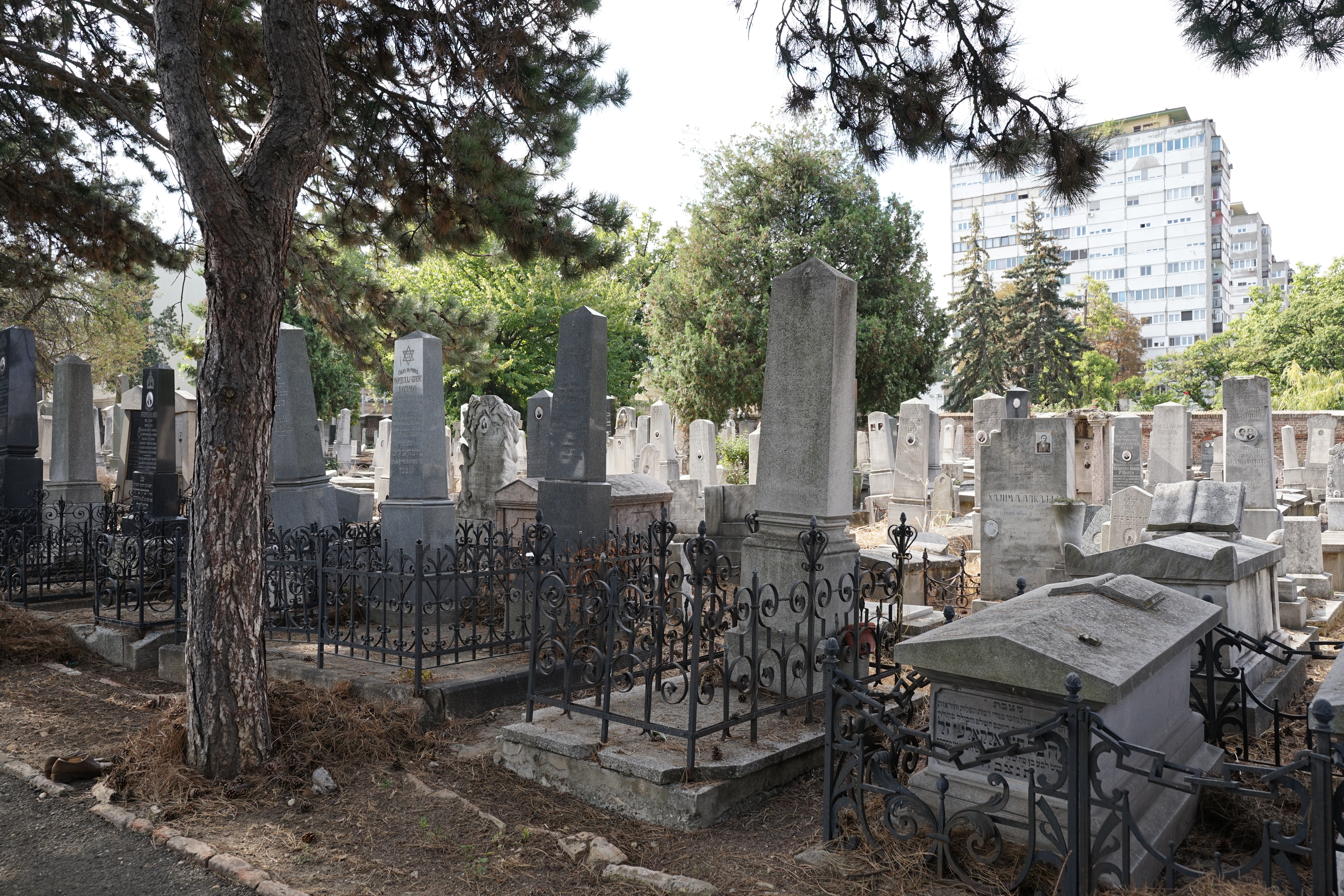
View of graves on the Sephardic Jewish Cemetery, September of 2019.

Next to the Cemetery of Liberators is the Jewish Sephardic cemetery with the remains of Jewish soldiers who died in the Balkan Wars and World War I, ossuary of Jewish refugees from Austria and the Memorial to the Holocaust victims and Jewish soldiers died in World War II by the architect Bogdan Bogdanović. It is one of two Jewish cemeteries in Belgrade which is cared for by the Chevra kadisha commission.

The original Sephardic cemetery was established in 1888, further down the Dalmatinska Street. In 1925 it was moved across the New Cemetery, on the lot owned by Đorđe Kurtović, a merchant from Šabac, who sold it to the Jewish community. Today it covers 12,748 m^{2} (137,220 sq ft) and has over 4,000 tombstones. In July 2019, city decided to expand the cemetery as it became inadequate long time ago. The area of the cemetery will be enlarged more than a double, with additional 1.52 ha (3.8 acres).

The cemetery is divided by the central pathway with an avenue of pines. Close to the entrance is the impressive monument to dead soldiers from the 1912–1919 wars, erected in 1927. Officially named "Monument to the fallen warriors for the salvation, freedom and unification of the homeland", it has inscribed 132 names of the Serbian Jewish soldiers. The monument combines Serbian (two headed eagle, fire-steels, lyrics by Njegoš), Jewish (Star of David) and military symbols (rifle, sabre, šajkača). In Jewish tradition, the pebbles have been placed next to the soldier's names.

The stone-made Holocaust memorial which commemorates Jewish victims from 1941 to 1945 is at the end of the path. More specifically, it is dedicated to the 1941 execution of the Austrian Jews in the Zasavica bog in western Serbia. The access paths to the memorial are made from the remains of the Jewish houses demolished during the bombings of Belgrade and occupation in World War II. Though the monument was sculptured by Bogdanović in 1952 and it is not that old, its exact symbolism is unknown. There are three explanations: 1) two wings represent the Ashkenazi and the Sephardic Jews while the space between with the menorah symbolizes the parting of the Red Sea by Moses and road to freedom; 2) tablets with 10 commands; 3) hands on one wing represent the Kohen while the pitcher on another represents the Tribe of Levi. Within the memorial are the ossuary with 197 skeletons and the urn with the remains of Bogdanović, upon his wish even though he was not Jewish, which was approved by the Serbian Jewish community.

Other monuments include the one above the joint tomb of the children died from the Spanish flu during the Interbellum and the sarcophagi-shaped memorial with the remains of 13 rabbis and teachers reinterred from the old cemetery in the Dalmatinska Street in 1928. There is also a monument to the ill-fated 1939–1941 Kladovo transport. It was erected in 1959 on a design by Andrija Mešulam, after 800 bodies of the victims were collected and reinterred here. Other notable feature is the tomb of the Buli family (Bencion Buli, banker and politician; Hugo Buli, who brought football to Serbia. He is not buried in the tomb as he was killed in a gas van and thrown out of it on an unknown location). A Holocaust victim, Avram S. Lević (1869–1941), who saved and protected the Miroslav Gospel in World War I, is also buried here. There is also a genizah, a "grave for the books", built in 1928. The monument is ornamented with an open scroll of Torah and books made of stone.
