= Monument and Memorial Ossuary to the Defenders of Belgrade =

Memorial in Belgrade, Serbia

Coordinates: 44°48′35″N 20°29′06″E

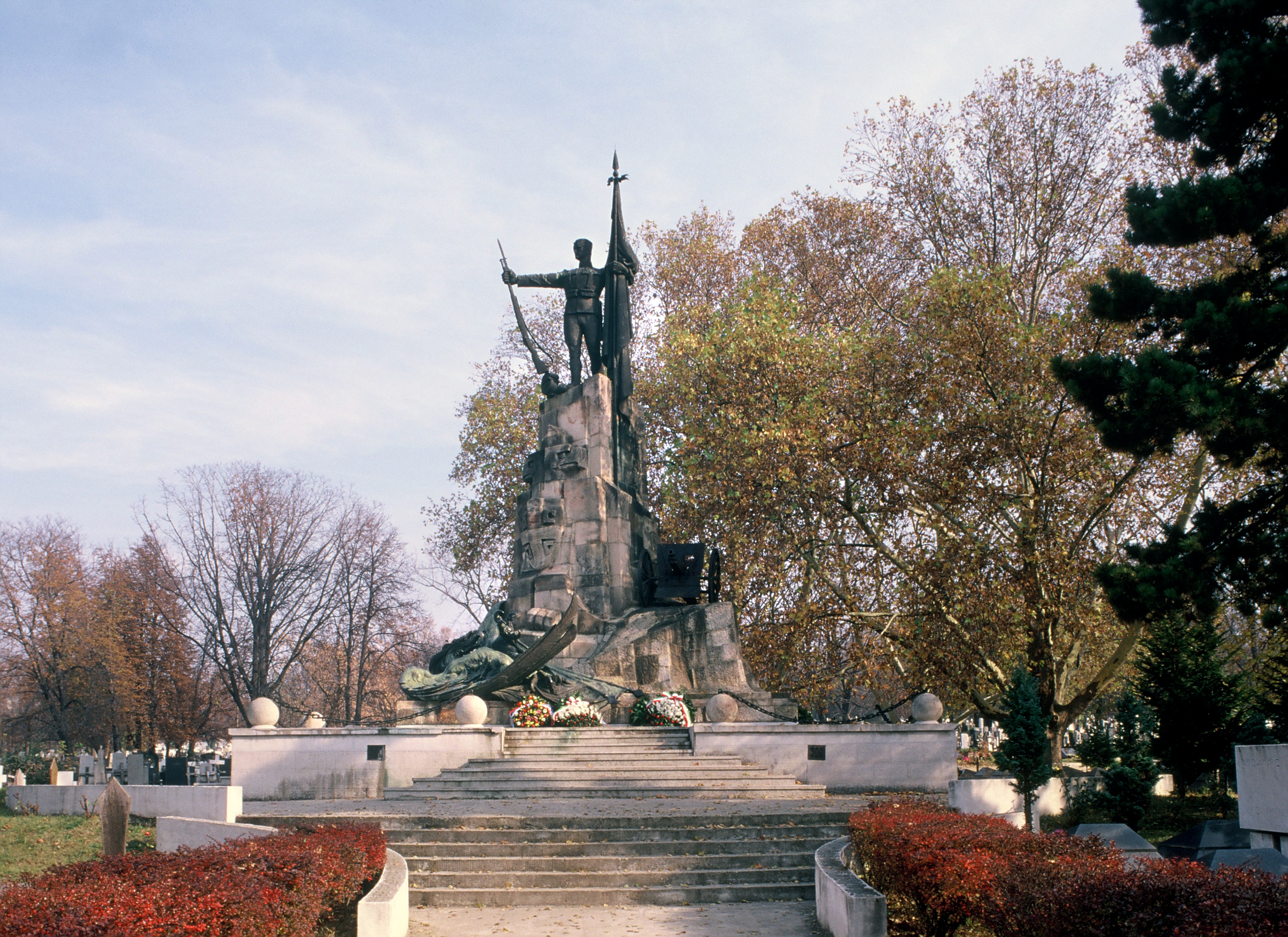

The Monument and Memorial Ossuary to the Defenders of Belgrade 1914–1918, are First World War memorials in Belgrade. Due to its location in Novo Groblje, the memorials are less accessible to broader public.

== History ==
The most frequently attacked and defended of all European cities, Belgrade was the first capital city that was bombarded in the First World War. Marshal Louis Franchet d`Esperey decorated the city with the French Legion of Honour for the heroism of its defenders.

Thirteen years after the war, in 1931, the remains of fallen defenders were disinterred and laid in the memorial ossuary built in Novo Groblje (New Cemetery). The ossuary also received the remains of soldiers who had perished in the Balkan Wars. The erection of the memorial ossuary on the site of a former military cemetery was funded from the contributions given by the survivors assembled in the Association of Reserve Officers and Soldiers and by the City of Belgrade. Being the strongest military veteran organisation in the Kingdom of Yugoslavia, the Association promoted diverse activities aimed at perpetuating the memory of fallen soldiers and improving the life of survivors. The memorial bears the inscription: To the Defenders of Belgrade / The Association of Reserve Officers and Soldiers / 1931.

== Designers ==
The design for the monument and the memorial ossuary to the defenders of Belgrade was done by the prominent architect and sculptor, the Russian immigrant, Roman Verhovskoj. The memorial was designed by the prominent Russian-born architect and sculptor Roman Verhovskoj. The sculptural work was done by Verhovskoj and the sculptors Živojin Lukić and Vladimir Pavlovich Zagorodnyuk, also a Russian. Roman Verhovskoj, who himself had fought in the Great War, found refuge in Serbia in the early 1920s, where he worked for the Royal Household, the Ministry of Construction and as an independent designer .

== Appearance ==
The monument and the memorial ossuary to the defenders of Belgrade 1914–1918 is a complex structure sited on the highest point of the cemetery. It is 19.40 m high, with its central massif rising to the height of 10 m. The ossuary, which was built first, ten years after the decision to build it, had been made in 1921, and received the remains of 3,529 identified and 1,074 unidentified soldiers. The identified remains were put in individual urns bearing the name of the deceased, while the unidentified remains were entombed in a separate vault in the ossuary. The ossuary is surmounted by a monument which is accessed by a flight of stairs. Rising from a stone base is a monolith, executed by Verhovskoj, which bears the emblem of the Kingdom of Serbia, the only such example in the interwar period. The Serbian double-headed eagle is carved in a stylised manner. The dominant element of the monument is the statue of the Serbian soldier with a rifle in his hand, ready to defend his country symbolised by the flag sprouting from a rock. Three crosses occurring on the monument – the cross on the top of the flag shaft, the cruciform posture of the statue and the cross in the emblem – are universal symbols of suffering . At the bottom of the monolith is the giant figure of a deadly wounded eagle with its talons turned up and wings spread out. The eagle personifies the defeated enemy lying on laid-down flags, another symbol of the victory over the enemy, while the broken chains symbolise the liberation of the Serbian people from enslavement. The eagle cast in black bronze creates a contrast to the eagle carved in light-coloured stone, a symbol of peace, freedom and justice, and the two taken together symbolise the victory of good over evil. An interesting element of the memorial is an authentic cannon mounted on a ledge at about half height of the monolith. The practice of incorporating real cannons, the most straightforward symbols of warfare, into war memorials was quite common in Greece, France and Bulgaria in the interwar period, symbolizing the bravery of the warriors. Considering that memorials in the form of „a rock“ or „a mountain“ were also popular in the iconography of the period, Vehovskoj followed the traditional design of the war memorials in every aspect .

== Location ==
At the time of the erection of the monument and the memorial ossuary to the defenders of Belgrade 1914—1918 there arose a public controversy over its location. Its designer Verhovskoj and many artists, including the painter, art critic, professor and the dean of the Belgrade University Faculty of Engineering Branko Popović, were opposed to the decision to place the memorial in a cemetery instead of setting it up on some of the capital city's squares. The public opposition to the location did, however, not lead to its being changed. The monument and the memorial ossuary to the defenders of Belgrade was dedicated on Armistice Day, 11 November 1931, in the presence of all leading civil and military figures, King Aleksandar Karađorđević, Queen Maria, government ministers, the Serbian Patriarch Barnabas, diplomatic representatives of the Allied countries, General Vojislav Tankosić, commander of Belgrade, as well as the organisers of the event, Milan Nedić, Mayor of Belgrade, the Deputy Mayor and Councillors, and the President of the Association of Reserve Officers and Soldiers, Milan Đ. Radosavljević, who handed over the memorial to the care of the City .

== Importance ==
The monument and the memorial ossuary to the defenders of Belgrade 1914–1918 are under the state protection as the part of Novo groblje (New cemetery) which is a designated cultural monument of great importance for the Republic of Serbia (The Decision, The Official Gazette SRS no. 28/83).
