= Oto Logo =

Serbian sculptor and painter

Oto Logo (Serbian Cyrillic: Ото Лого; 15 August 1931 – 4 January 2016) was a Serbian sculptor and painter.

== Biography ==
He was born 15 August 1931 in Belgrade. He finished high school in Subotica, and then he graduated from the Academy of Applied Arts in Belgrade, in the sculpture department. He was a member of the Association of Fine Artists of Serbia, better known as ULUS - from 1955 to 2007 when he retired.

He died in Belgrade on 4 January 2016 at age 85. He was buried in Alley of the Greats of the Belgrade New Cemetery.

== Exhibitions ==
He has exhibited at a large number of collective exhibitions in the country and abroad. He has organized solo exhibitions in the following cities: Belgrade, Paris, Venice, Skopje, Sarajevo, Liège, Brussels, Niš, Zürich, Mannheim, New York, London, Zagreb, Dubrovnik, Arandjelovac, Novi Sad, Struga, Ohrid, Zemun, Mionica.

He independently exhibited sculpture and graphics in Belgrade in 1957, 1959 and 1962. He has exhibited at exhibitions:

- "Contemporary Serbian graphics", Novi Sad, 1959.
- III and IV "International Exhibition of Graphics", Ljubljana.
- I and II "Exhibition of Yugoslav Graphics", Zagreb.
- Exhibitions "Contemporary Yugoslav Graphics" in Venice, Turin, Milan, Rome, Tokyo and Cuba.
- Exhibition "Contemporary Serbian Art", Zagreb, 1963.

After a long break, Otto Logo exhibited his nine exhibits at the group exhibition "Fashion Avenue Art", in the Audi salon, in Belgrade, on May 27, 2008. He also exhibited in the "Gallery '73" in a group exhibition entitled "Chronicle of Art Sremčica", from August 26 to September 4, 2008.

== Works ==
Otto Logo is the author of a large number of sculptures, busts and monuments.

- Monument to Fallen Soldiers, Kovačica, 1954.
- Bust Louis Pasteur, Subotica, 1965.
- Bust of Andrija Štampar, Subotica, 1966.
- Monument "Shell", Arandjelovac, 1966.
- Bust of Ludwik Hirzfeld, Subotica, 1967.
- Bust Milan Jovanović Batut, Subotica, 1968.
- Bust Edward Jenner, Subotica, 1968.
- Monument Dragojlo Dudić, Valjevo, 1971.
- Monument "Prozivka" or "SNOP", Subotica, 1977. (Note: The monument was inaugurated on December 18, 1977.)
- Monument to Branko Krsmanović, Paraćin, 1981. (Note: The monument was inaugurated on May 9, 1981.)
- Monument to the Battle of Ljig in 1941, Ljig, 1981.
- Monument to the fallen fighters of NOR, Obrenovac, 1983.
- Monument Ivan Sarić | to Ivan Sarić, Subotica, 1984.
- Monument to Major Victims in 1942.
- Monument to the national hero Dušan Jerković, Bajina Bašta, 1987.
- Monument to Živojin Mišić, Mionica, 1988.
- Monument to the warriors of the liberation wars 1912-1918. year, Aleksandrovac, 1990.
- Monument to Jovan Cvijić, Belgrade, 1994.

In Memorial Museum "21 October "Kragujevac" are two sculptures made of galvanized sheet metal, one opposite the other, by Otto Log: "Penetration to the East", an eagle sculpture symbolizing the German military force at the beginning of the war and "Death of a Mastodon", a sculpture representing a bird that turns into a shapeless mass of metal. thus symbolizing the collapse of the Fascist movement.

- He designed the "Great Golden Plaque - Duke Živojin Mišić".

== Gallery ==
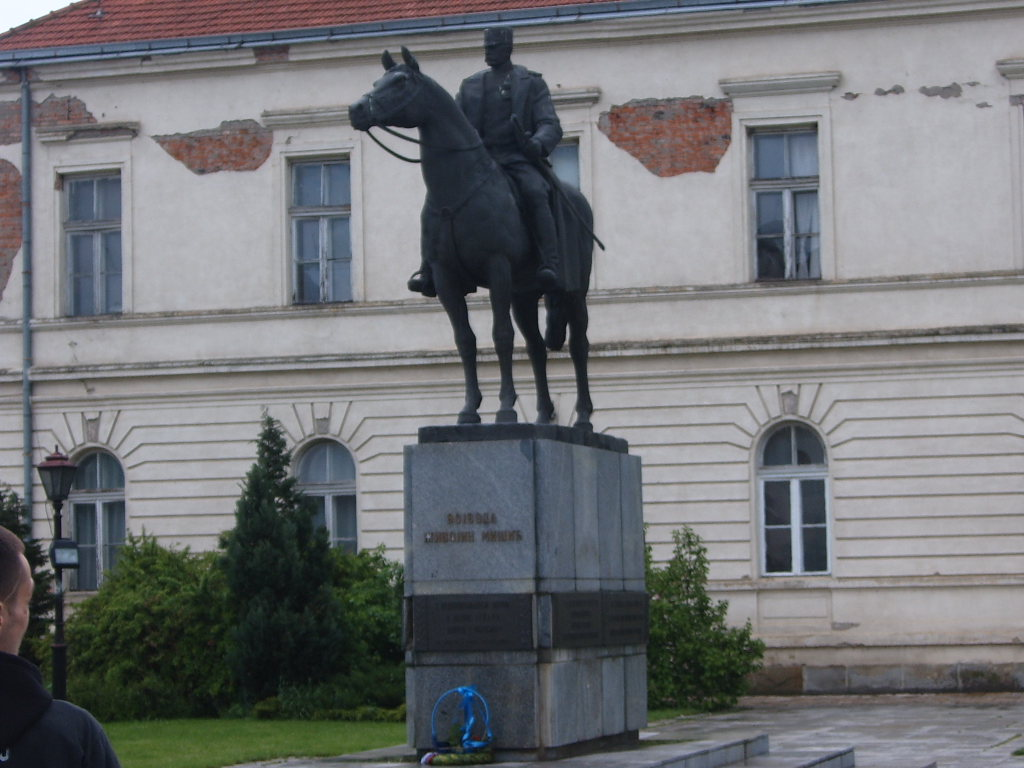
Živojin Mišić, Mionica

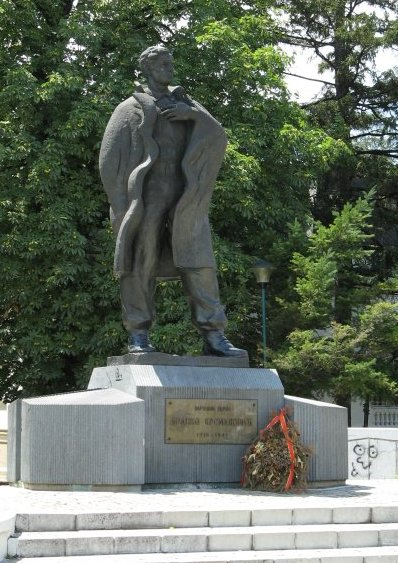
Branko Krsmanović, Paraćin

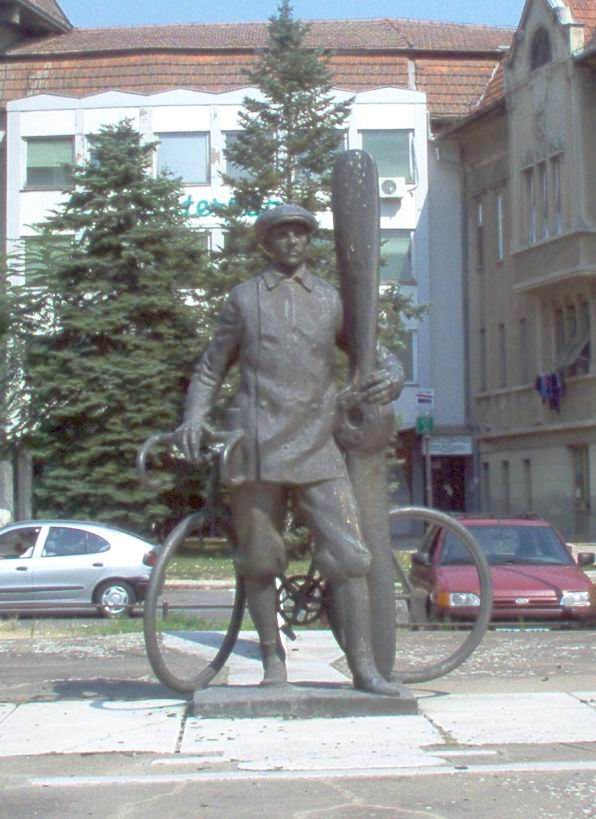
Ivan Šarić, Subotica

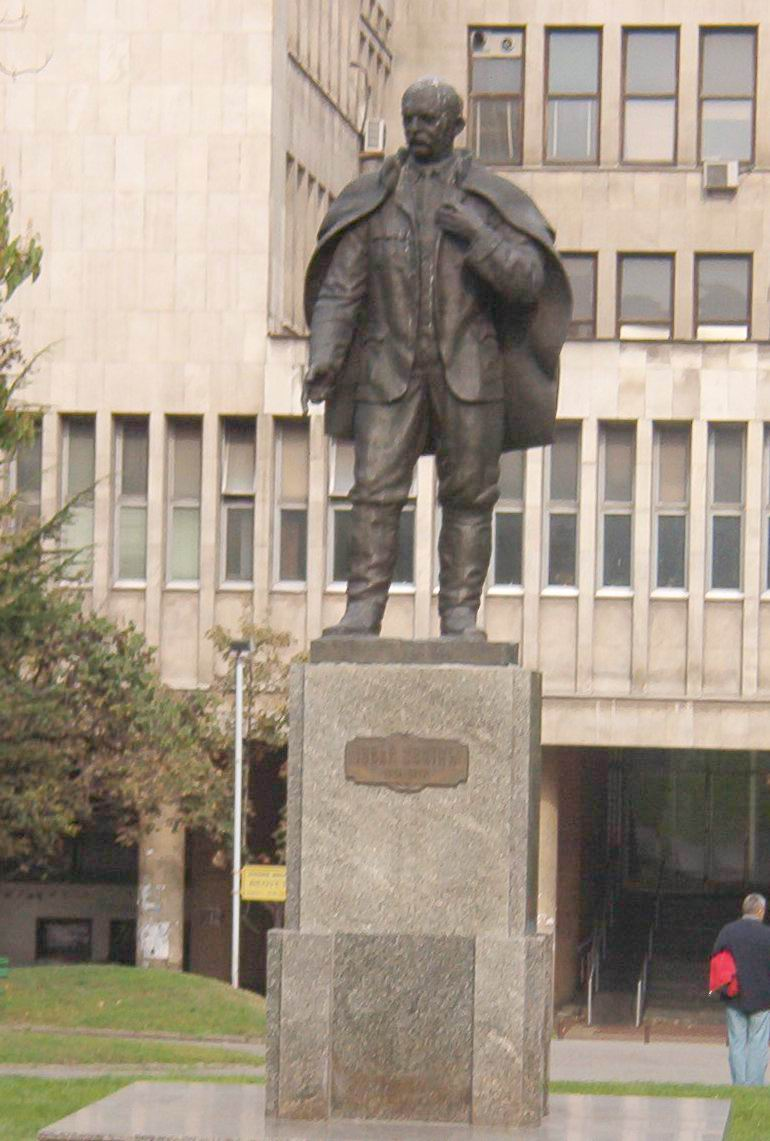
Јovan Cvijić, Belgrade

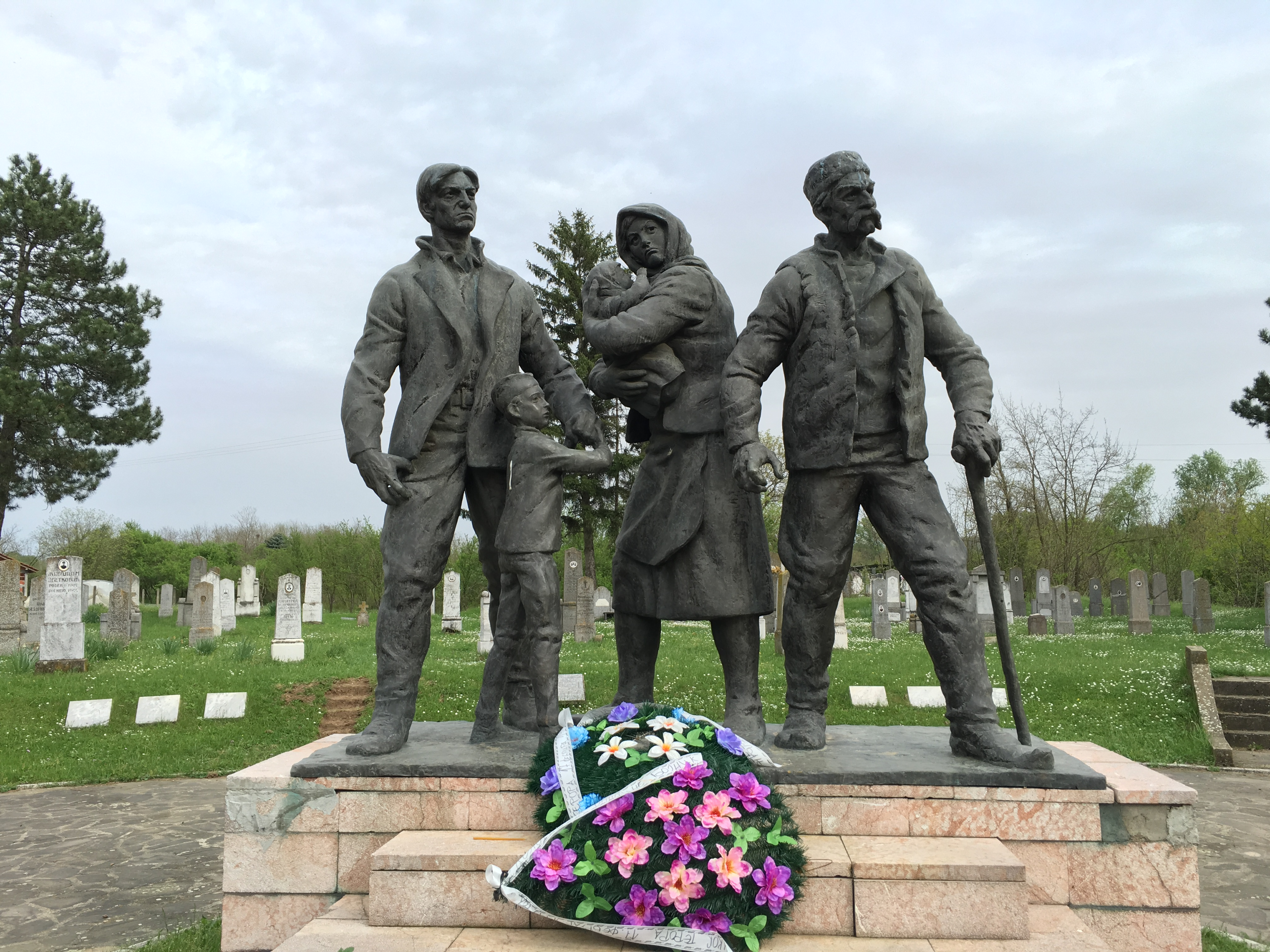
Monument to Mass Victims 1942, Soldier

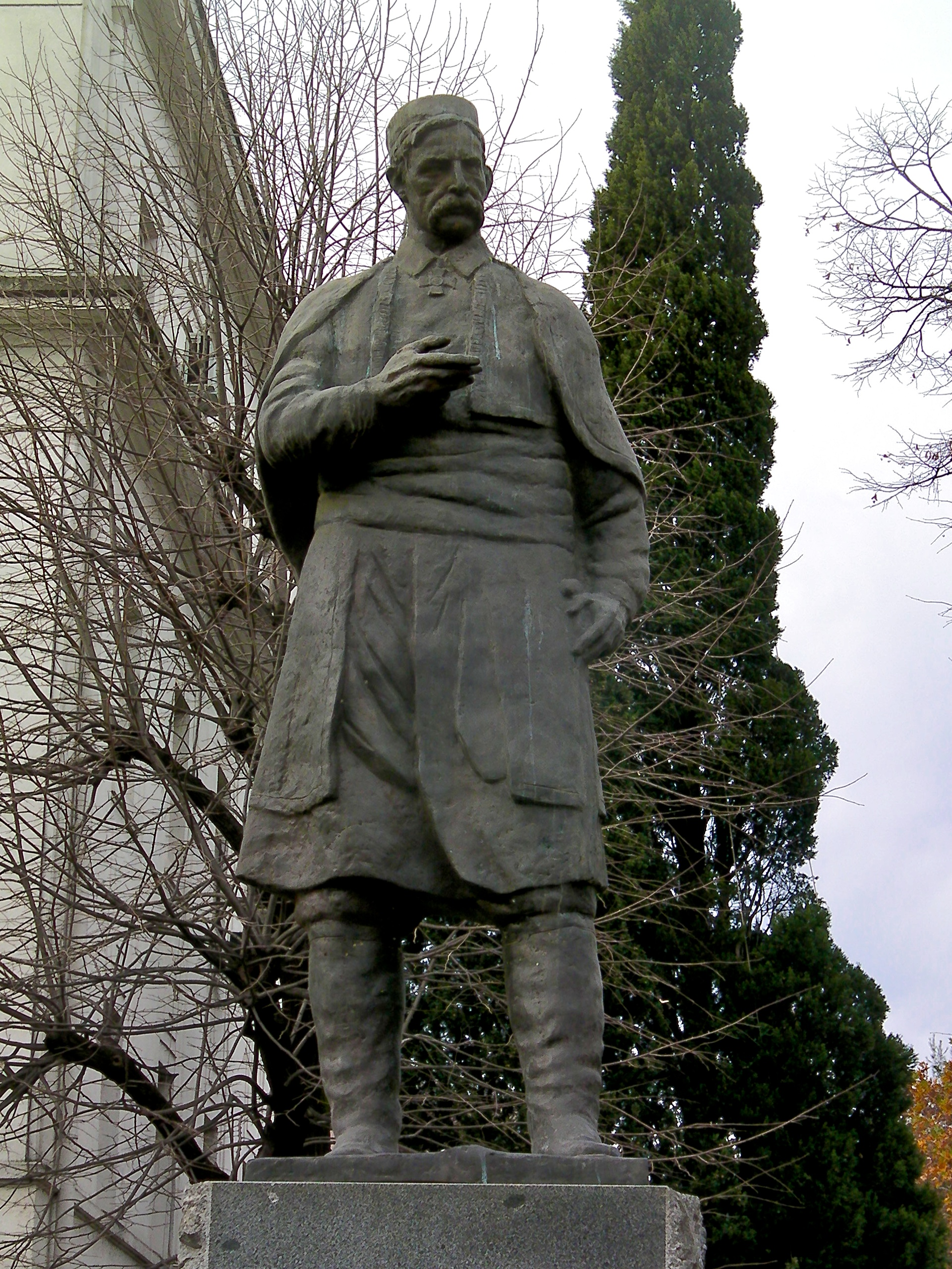
Маrko Miljanov, Podgorica
