= Nebojša Mitrić =

Nebojša Mitrić (7 July 1931 – 23 August 1989) was a Serbian and Yugoslav sculptor, painter, engraver and medalist.

== Biography ==
Mitrić was born in Jewish family, he was the only member of his family who survived the Holocaust. His mother hid him at the shoemaking store "Mitrić" in Belgrade's Brankova street, he later adopted a surname "Mitrić" after the shop owner who saved his life. He was a student of the first generation at the newly-founded Academy of Applied Arts under Professor Ivan Tabaković. After graduating in 1952, he decide to visit medieval monuments in Serbia, Macedonia, Montenegro and Dalmatia which later inspired his art. The result of his opus includes medals, various sculptures, portraits and reliefs imbued with motifs from the time of the Serbo-Byzantine era, his national tradition, historical customs, and characters, beginning from Emperor Dušan the Mighty, Prince Lazar of Serbia, Despot Stefan Lazarević, Filip Višnjić, Vuk Karadžić, Petar II Petrović Njegoš, Janko Veselinović, Jovan Jovanović Zmaj, Borisav Stanković, Nikola Tesla, Milena Pavlović-Barili, Radoje Domanović and Branko Miljković.

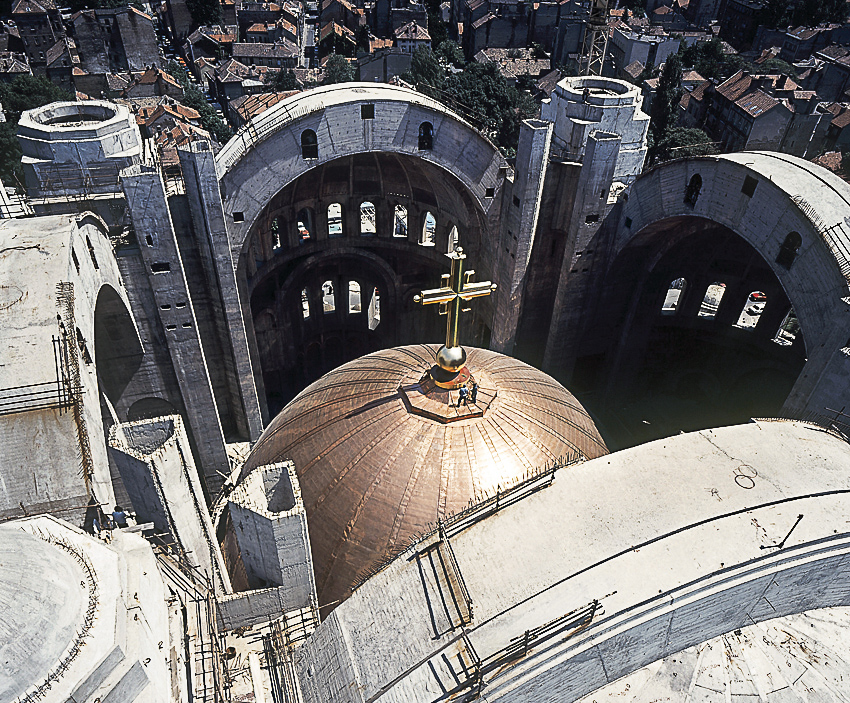
Crosses on the Temple of Saint Sava were designed and made by Mitrić

The basic traditionalism of Serbian sculptures after World War II was enriched by the individual expressions of Jovan Soldatović and Nebojša Mitrić, but it was left to yet another generation to break away from figurative conceptions. In 1973, commemorating the dedication of the new Njegoš mausoleum on Mount Lovćen, he created and designed a series of silver and gold medals.

Shortly before his death, Mitrić designed and created the crosses that now adorn the Temple of Saint Sava in the center of Belgrade. He committed suicide in 1989. He left behind wife Iza Krainer Mitrić, Slovene artist.

== Legacy ==
Noted art collector Pavle Beljanski decided in 1960 to include two of Mitrić's hunt-reliefs into his collection.

== Gallery ==
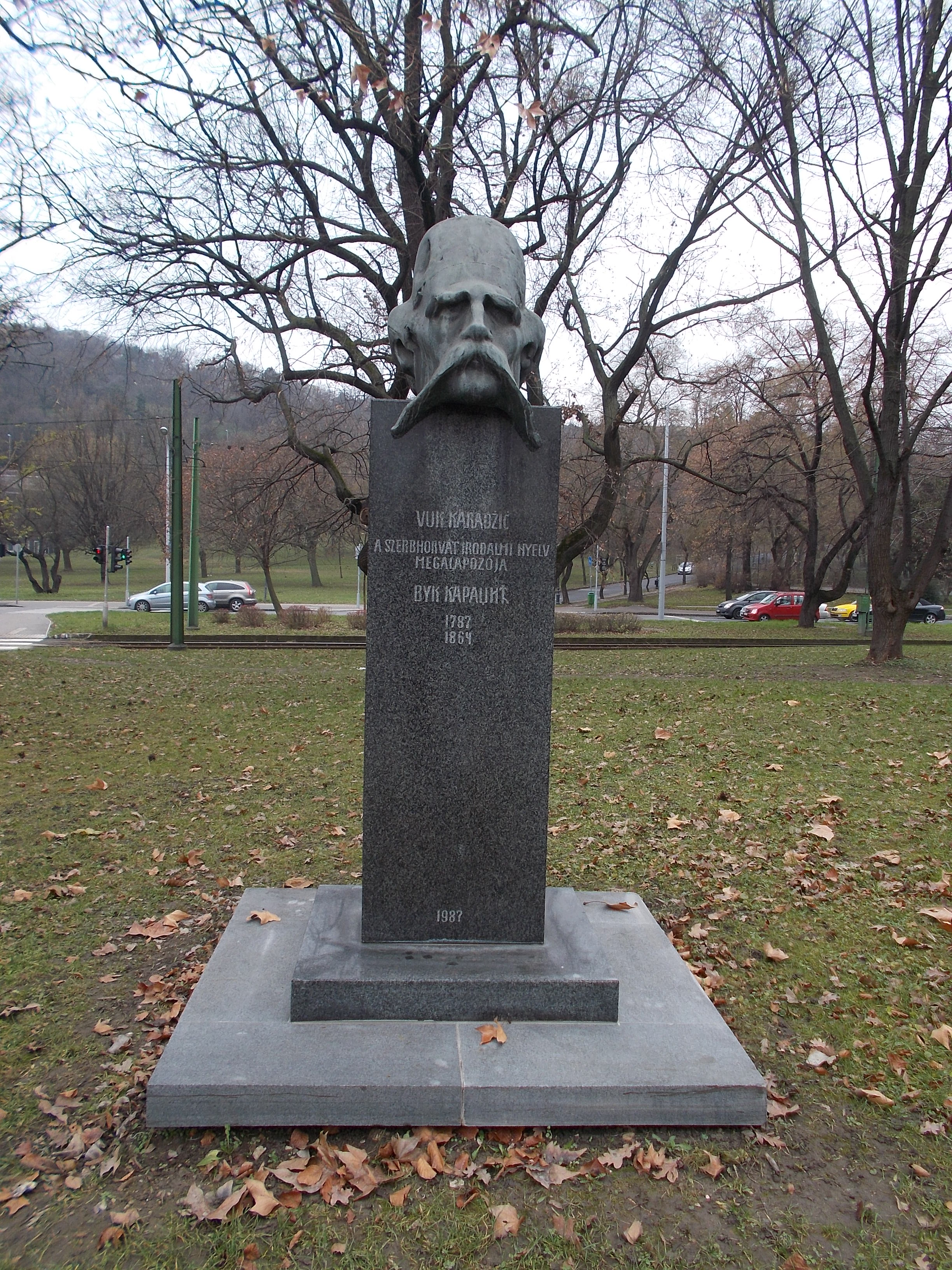
Bust of Vuk Stefanović Karadžić in Budapest

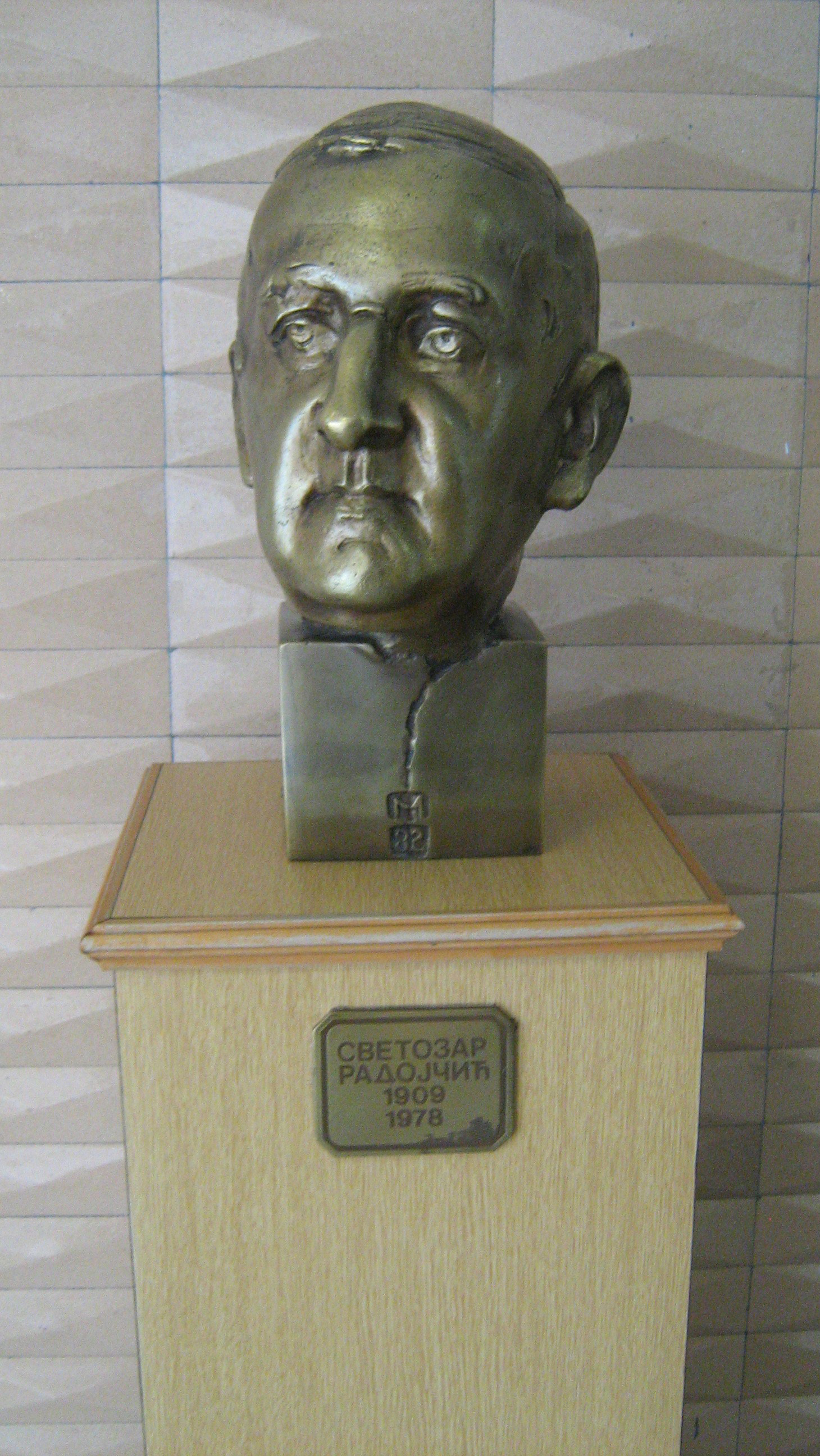
Bust of professor Svetozar Radojčić

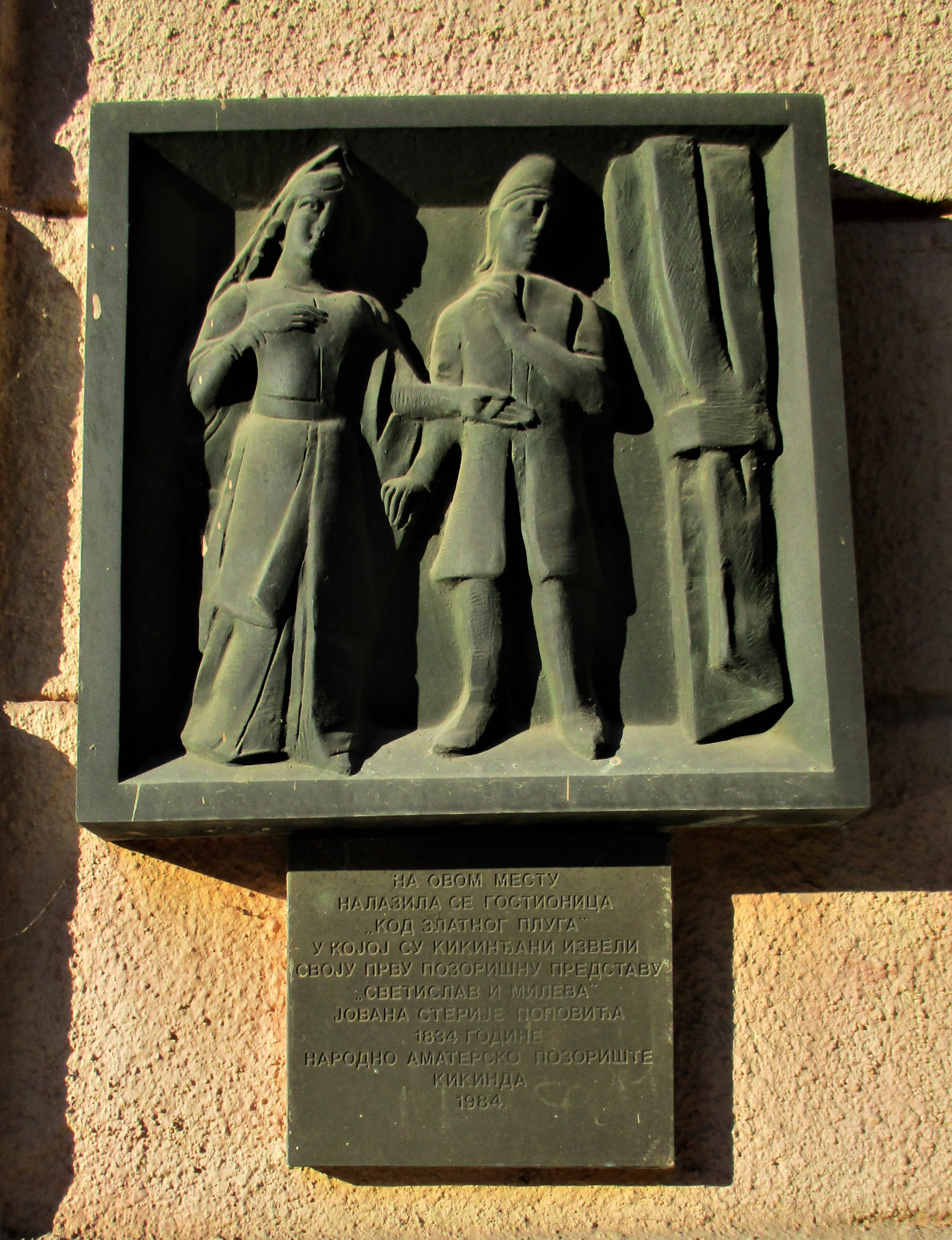
Memorial plaque in Kikinda

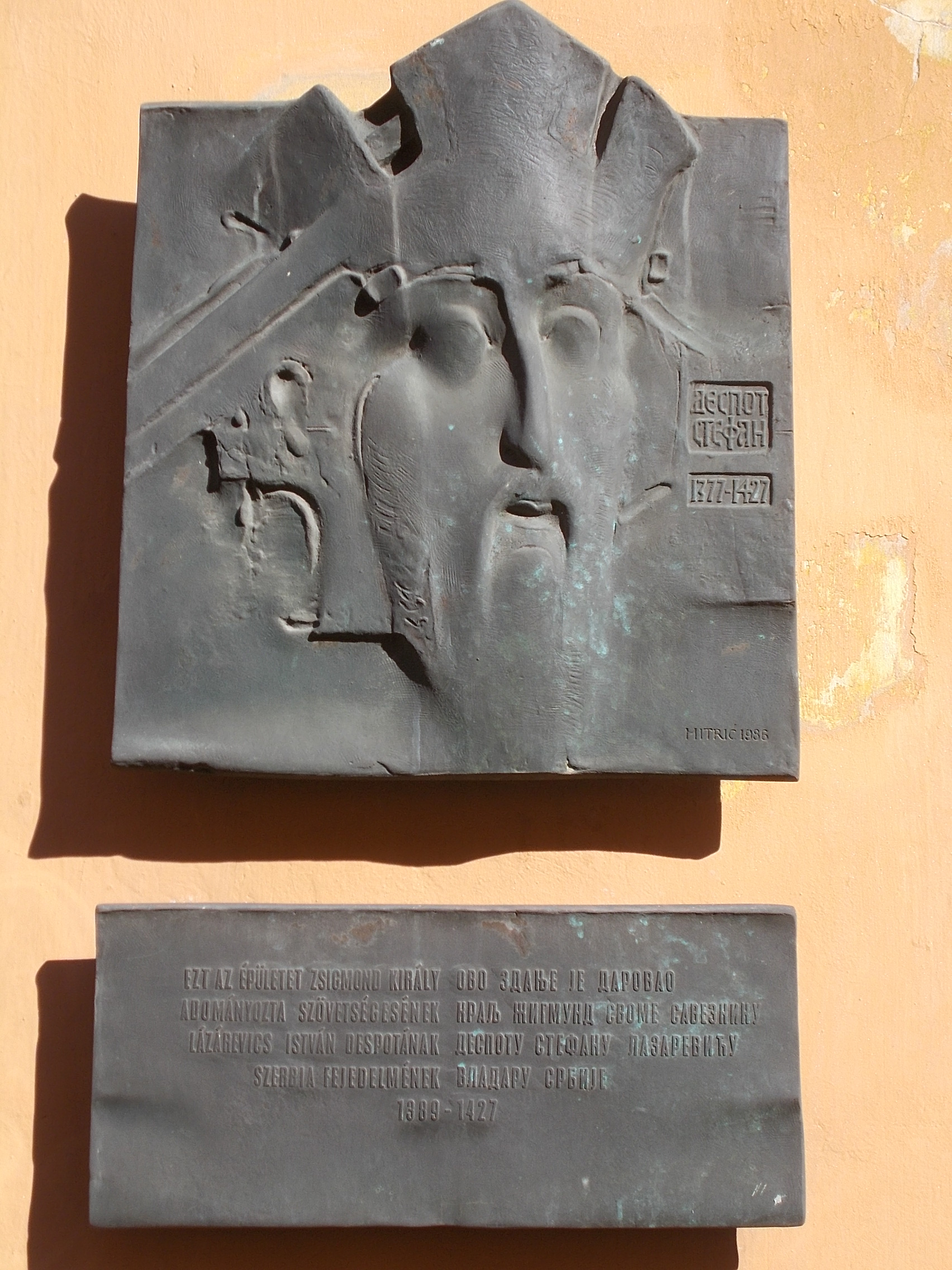
Plaque showing despot Stefan Lazarević in Budapest

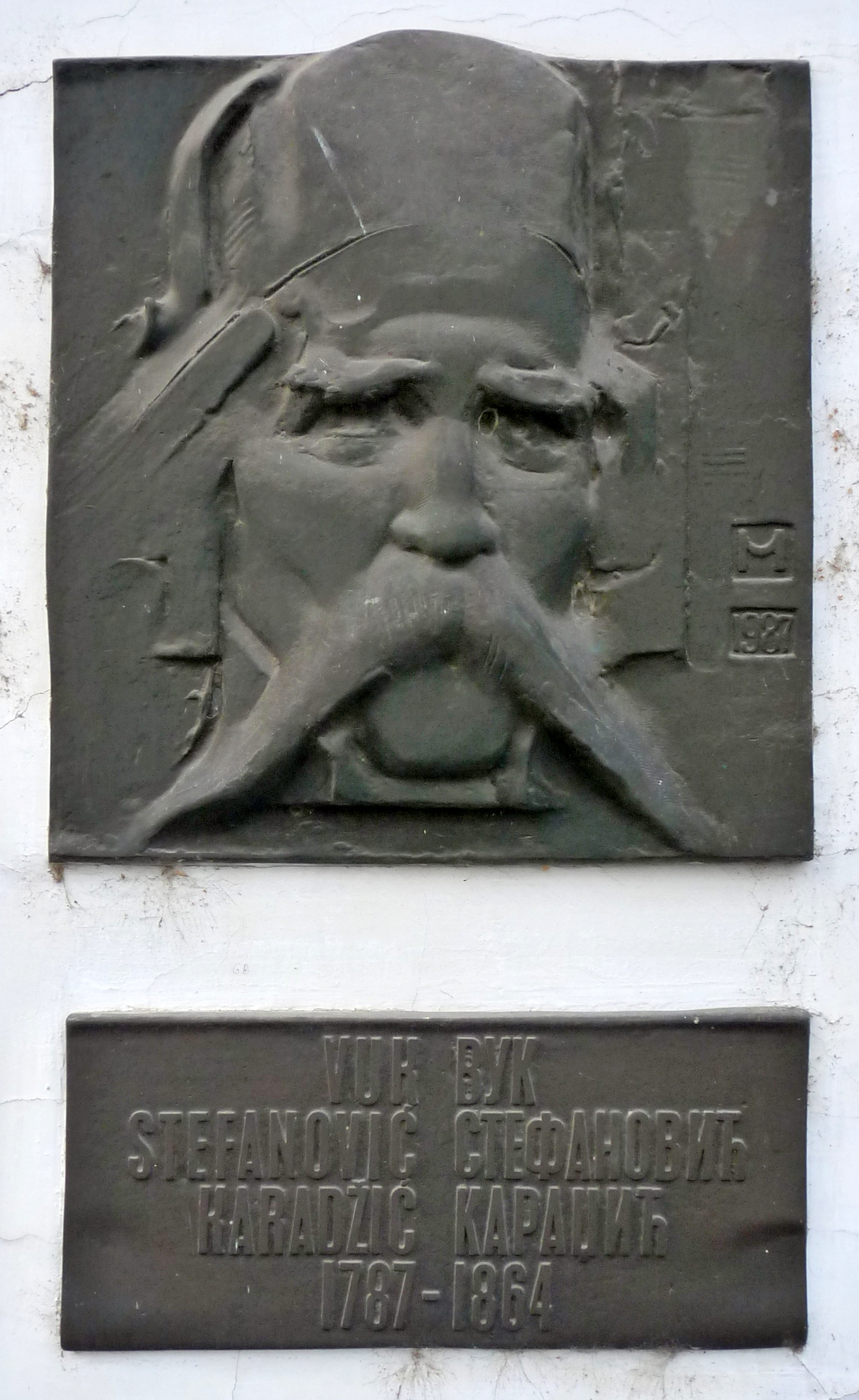
Plaque showing Vuk Stefanović Karadžić in Budapest

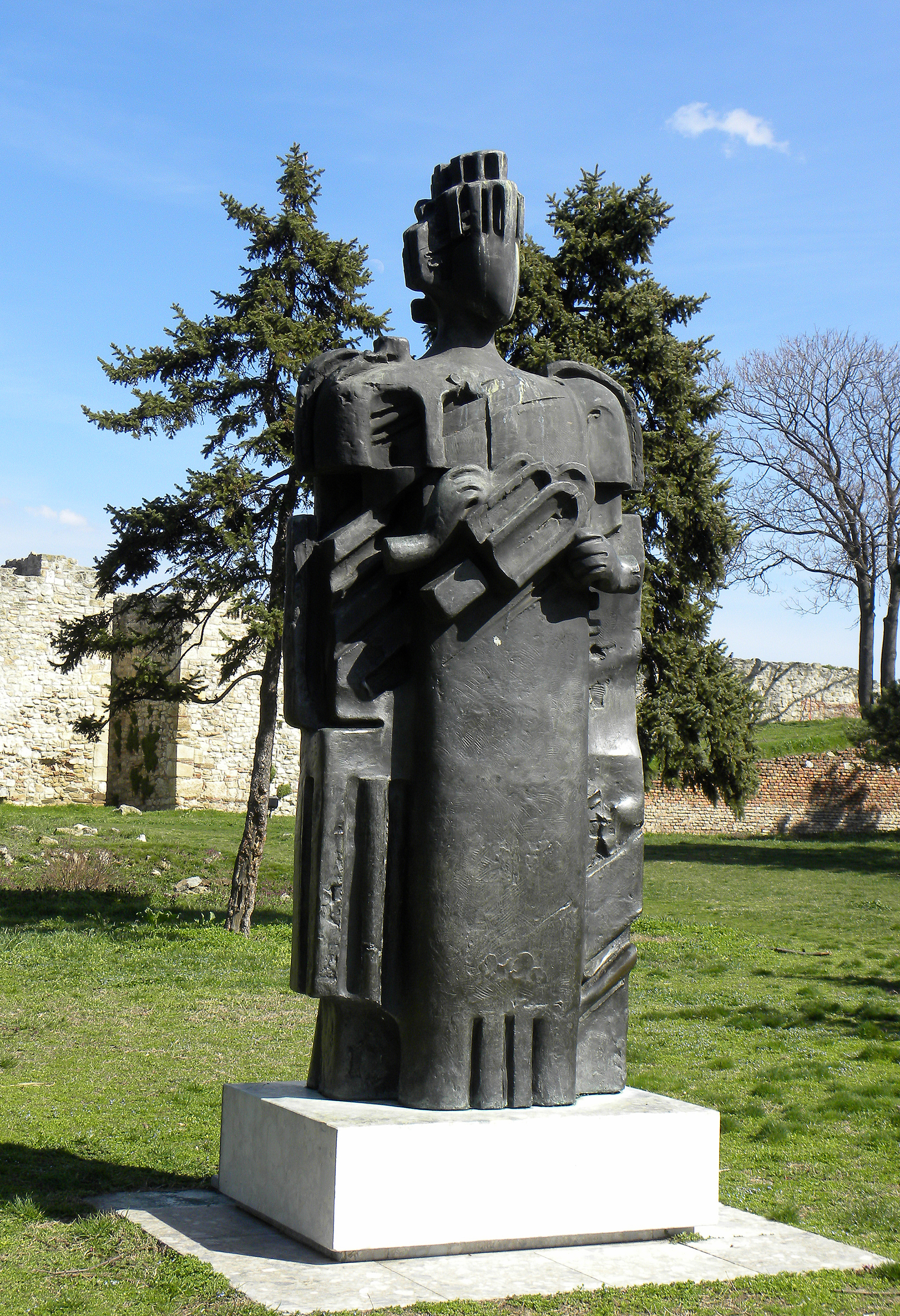
Monument to Despot Stefan Lazarević, Belgrade Fortress
