= Živojin Lukić =

Serbian sculptor

Živojin "Žika" Lukić (Serbian Cyrillic: Живојин Лукић; 10 February 1889 – 7 February 1934) was a Serbian sculptor.

== Life and work ==
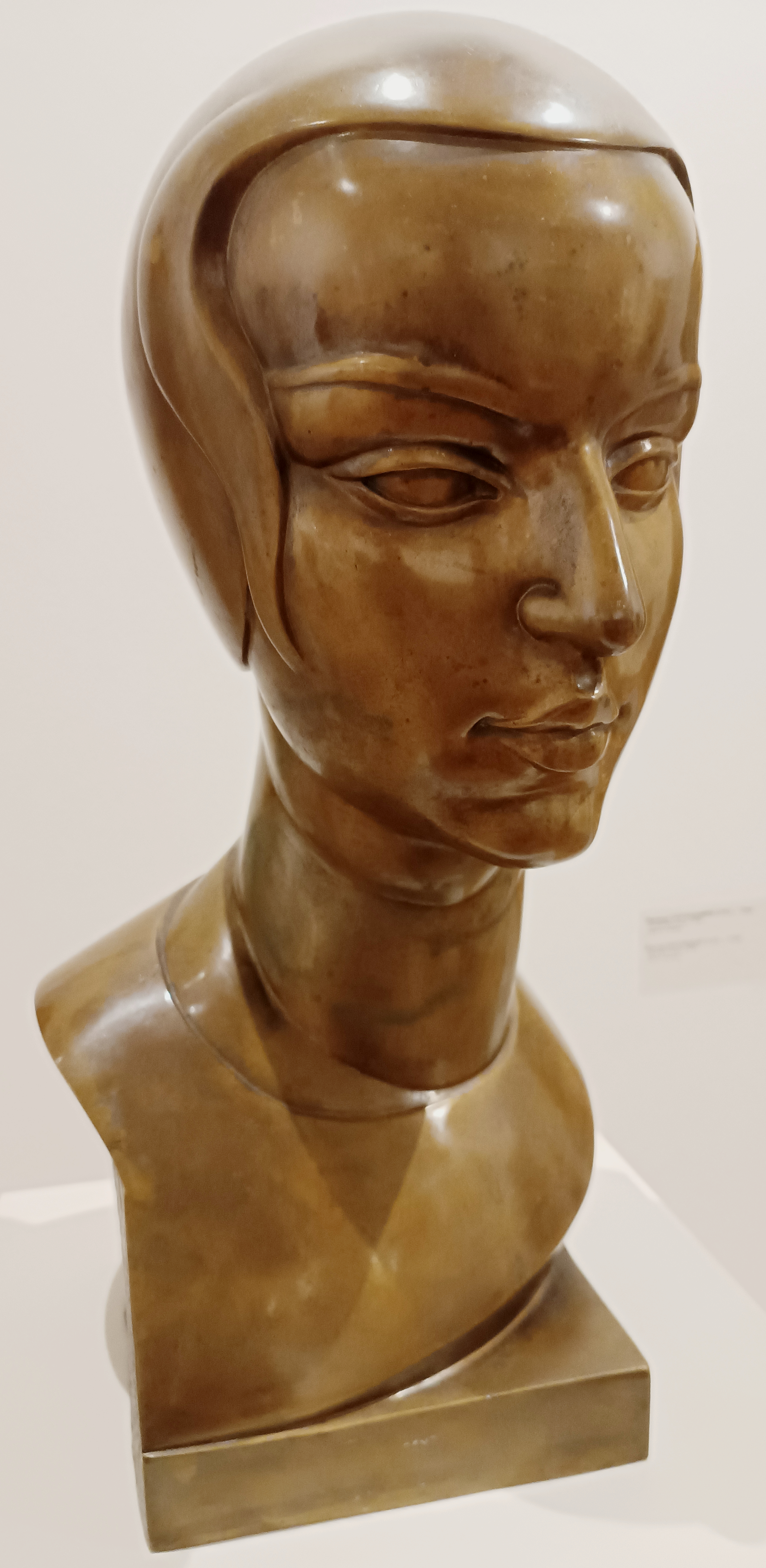
Bust of Dr. Radinka Hadžić, 1923. On display in the National Museum of Serbia, Belgrade.

Lukić was born in Belgrade in the Kingdom of Serbia. He studied art under the tutelage of professor Đorđe Jovanović at the School of Arts and Crafts in Belgrade, and then went on to study sculpture at the Academy of Architecture in Moscow from 1909 to 1913 with professor Nikolay Andreyev. During World War I, he was an artist for the Serbian High Command in Albania, producing various portrait medallions and commemorative plaques.

After the war, he was sent by King Peter I of Serbia to Rome to hone his craft from 1918 to 1922. He lived and worked in Cavtat from 1922 to 1924, after which he returned to Belgrade and began exhibiting his works with the Lada Art Association.

Žika Lukić brought modern concepts to the Serbian sculpture of the third decade of the last century, especially in portrait art which was his main focus. Gently relying on neo-Cubist style patterns, he used simple forms and clean lines that clearly defined the plastic features. His most famous works are in the Museum of Contemporary Art in Belgrade: Portrait of Dr. Radinka Hađić (1923), Portrait of Mrs. Zloković, (1926), The Little Bat (1928). He produced two sculptures for the Yugoslav parliament building, entitled Commerce and History. He also produced works in Moscow and Rome.

He died in Belgrade on 7 February, 1934.
