= Battle of Niš (1915) =

1915 battle during World War I

- Part of the Serbian Campaign of the Balkans Theatre (World War I)
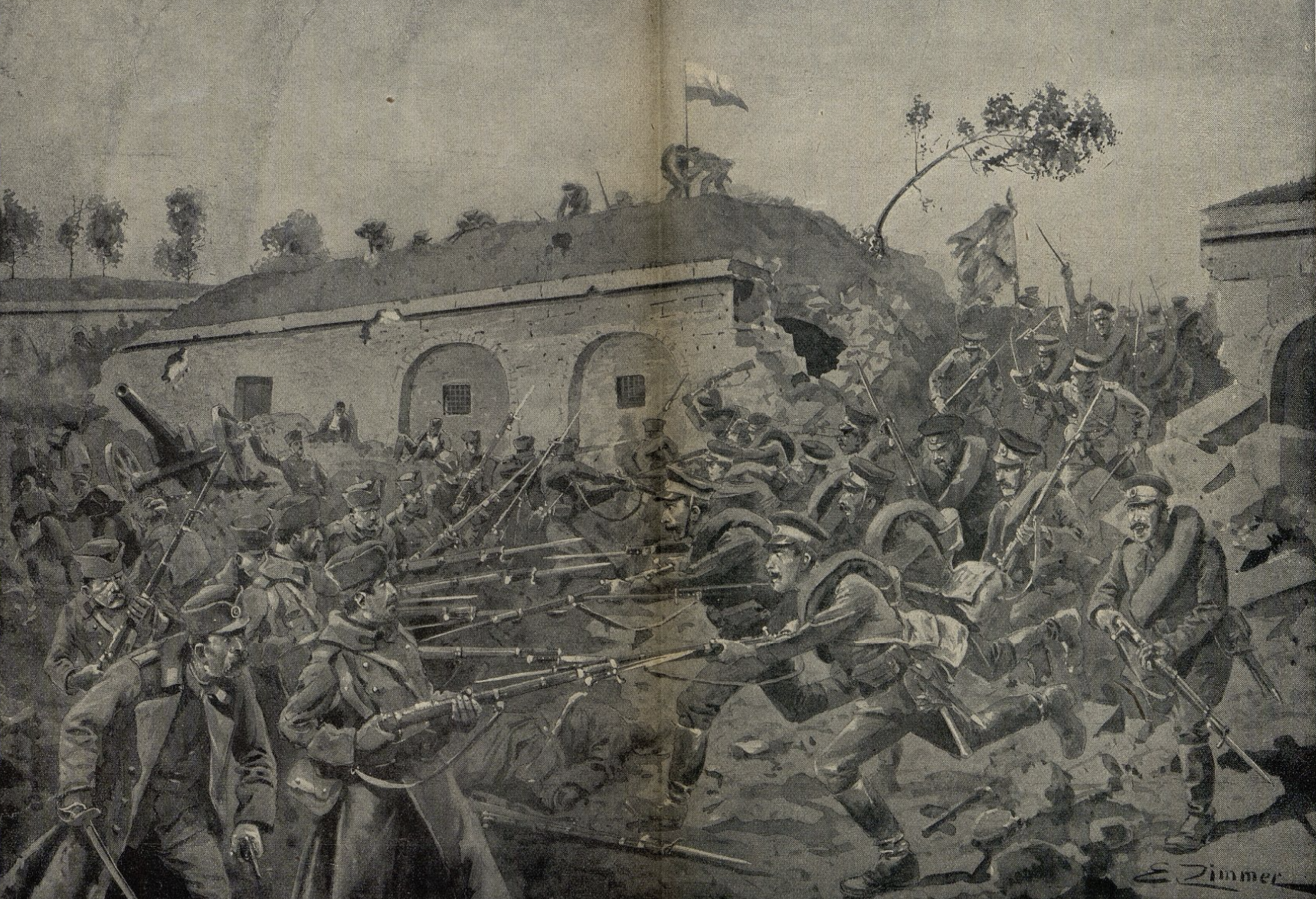
- Bulgarians taking the fort of Niš (illustration by Ernst Zimmer, 1915)
Date	4–5 November 1915
Location	Niš, Kingdom of Serbia, today Serbia 43°19′15″N 21°53′45″E
Result	Decisive Bulgarian victory

Belligerents
Bulgaria	Serbia

Commanders and leaders
(Bulgaria) Kliment Boyadzhiev	(Kingdom of Serbia) Stepa Stepanović

Units involved
Bulgarian First Army; 9th Pleven Infantry Division	Serbian Second Army

Casualties and losses
Unknown	Unknown killed and wounded 5,000 captured

The Battle of Niš was a military engagement between the army of the Kingdom of Bulgaria with support from the German Empire against the Kingdom of Serbia in November 1915, during the Central Powers Morava Offensive of World War I. City of Niš, serving as a capital of Serbia after the fall of Belgrade, was captured between 4 and 5 November 1915 by the forces of 9th Pleven Division of Bulgarian First Army. The fall of Niš had a huge psychological impact on both of fighting sides: Serbians were forced to continue in their Great Retreat, for Central Powers the victory ment removing the last obstacle for operating the Berlin–Baghdad railway, the shortest railway connection between Germany, Austria-Hungary and the Ottoman Empire.

== Prelude ==
=== Serbian campaign ===
In the beginning of October 1915 armies of Austria-Hungary, supported by German troops, launched a mayor offensive against Serbia with a combined force of over 600,000 soldiers. Massive numerical and technological superiority caused a quick collapse of Serbian defence: between 5 and 16 October 1915 Belgrade, capital of Serbia, was captured after intensive clashes forcing Serbian soldiers, civilians and also the government to flee further south. Serbian cabinet led by Prime Minister Nikola Pašić already moved their offices to the Palace of Niš on 26 July 1914, one of the biggest cities in the country, placed about 230 kilometers south-east from Belgrade, far enough from the front. The city was protected by the major Niš Fortress and also a few defensive posts in the city suburbs.

=== Morava Offensive ===
Critically for the Serbian Army, on 14 October 1915 Bulgaria, which had fought Serbia in the Second Balkan War in 1913, joined of the Central Powers and the war against Serbia, launching the Morava Offensive. Operation proceeded by the forces of the First Bulgarian Army commanded by General Kliment Boyadzhiev was delayed due to bad weather conditions and impassable terrain. Despite the resistance of the Serbian units, their defense was broken after the retreat of their posts near the town of Knjaževac under the pressure of the Bulgarian Eighth Tundza Infantry Division. This forced the Serbian units to withdraw from the Pirot Fortress on 14 October, where Bulgarians captured and c. 1,500 Serbian prisoners and 14 cannons. After this breakthrough the First Army then continued to a further advance towards Niš, enemy's provisional capital.

== Battle ==
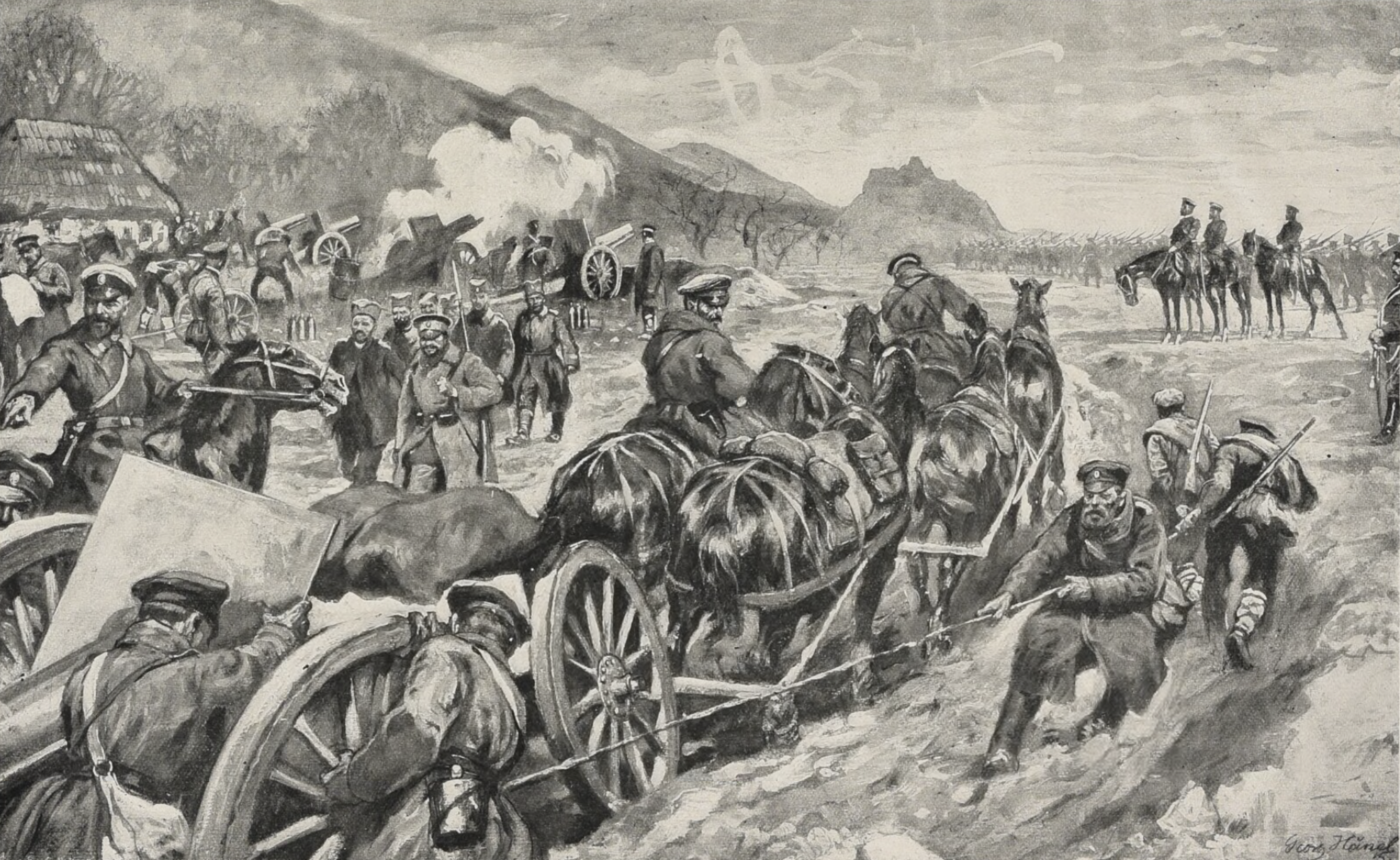
Bulgarian artillery shells the outer forts of Niš (illustration by Georg Hänel, 1915)

Defence of the city was crucially threaded after the fall of Aleksinac Fortress at the end of October 1915. On 4 November, after fierce fighting and Bulgarian artillery bombardment, the First Bulgarian Army reached the outskirts of Niš. The storming of the city was launched simultaneously by parts of the northern and eastern groups of Bulgarian forces. The defensive line of the Niš fortress was finally breached at 3 p.m. by the Fourth Pleven Infantry Regiment of the Ninth Pleven Division with a frontal bayonet attack. The Serbs then started a chaotic retreat leaving the entire fortified line.

Bulgarian soldiers entered the fort on the morning of 5 November without any further resistance capturing 42 old fortress cannons, several thousand rifles and a big amount of ammunitions, provision stores, as well as of around 5,000 prisoners of war.

On 6 November Bulgarians made contact with the German 11th Army of General Gallwitz.

== Aftermath ==
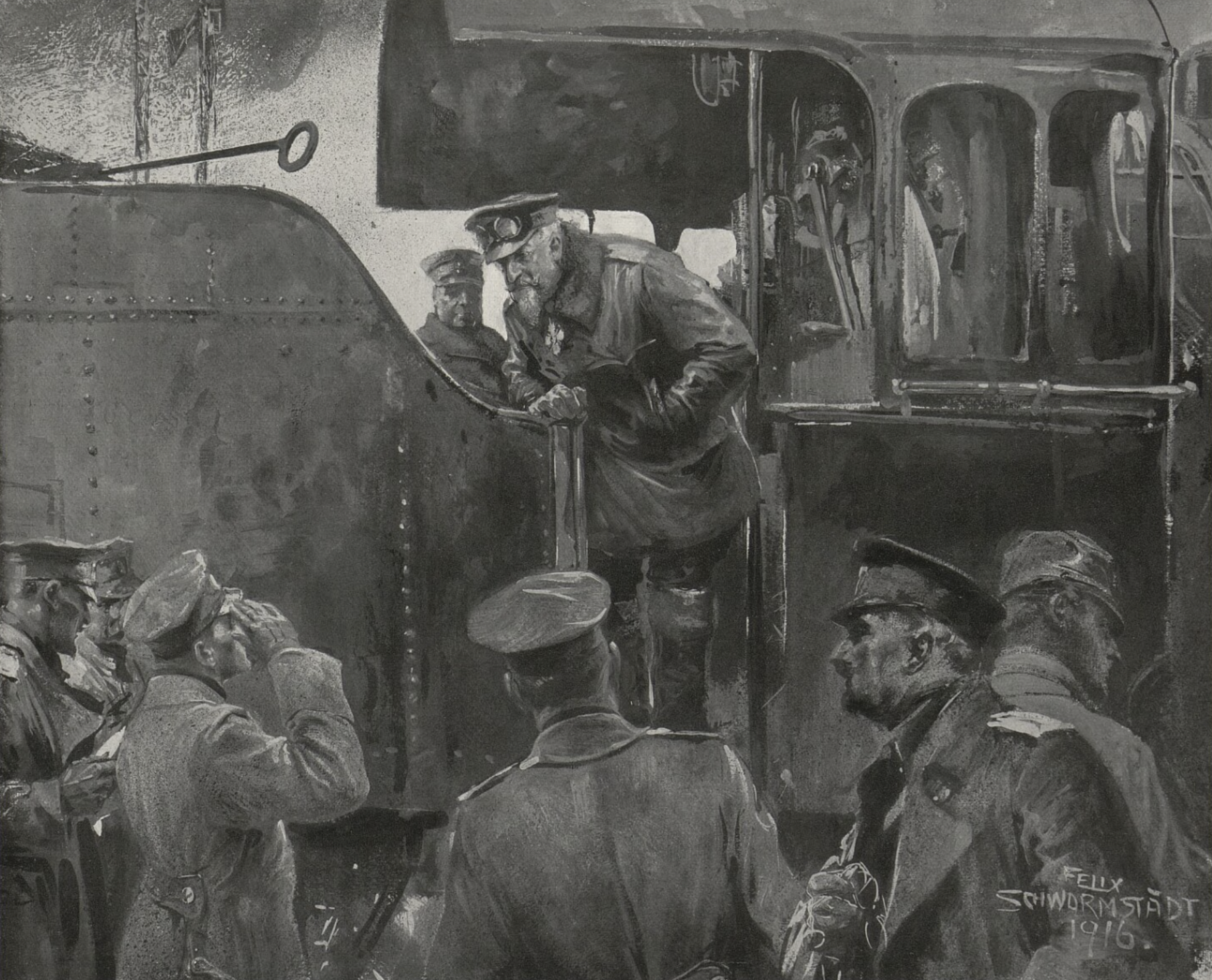
Ferdinand I as the driver of the locomotive of the first train after the restoration of the connection from Sofia to Niš, before the departure in Sofia (Felix Schwormstädt, 1916)

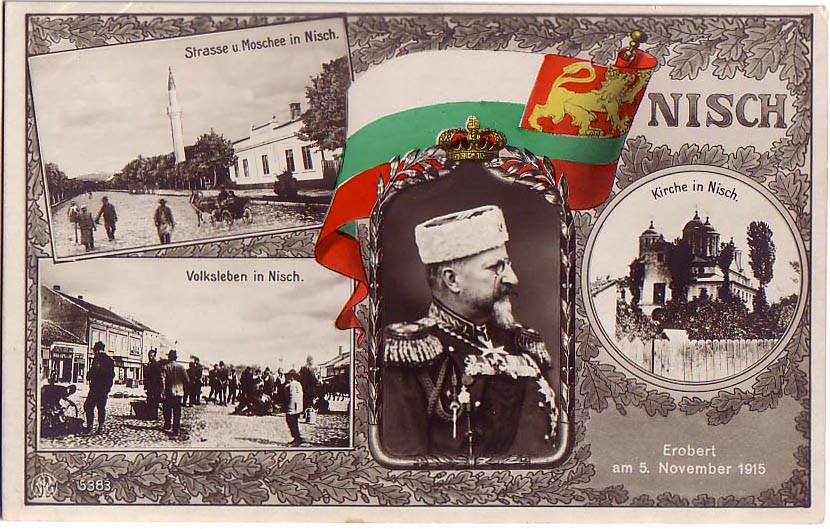
Bulgarian propaganda postcard celebrating the fall of Niš (1915)

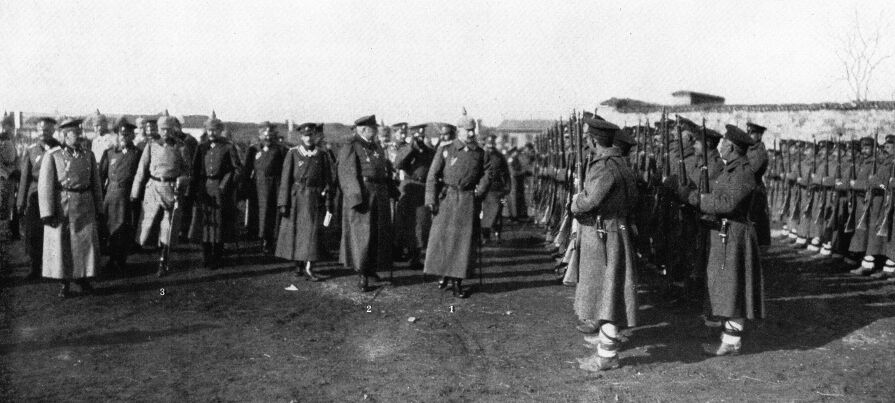
Ferdinand I and Wilhelm II on the military parade in Niš, January 1916

Loss of Niš caused a major strategic tragedy for the defending Serbs. The Bulgarian offensive cut off the retreat of the Serbian army towards Thessaloniki, where Entente army forces had landed to support them. The remaining Serbian units ignominiously retreated behind the Morava river, where they built defensive posts. Despite the opening of the new Macedonian front following the Entente debarkation further south, the Austro-Hungarian, Bulgarian and German armies successfully pushed the Serbians further to Kosovo, in winter 1915/1916 to the mountains in Albania, before they were finally evacuated to British-held Corfu island.

For the Central Powers capturing of Niš had a huge strategic importance too. The Belgrade–Sofia railway, which connection was cut by the Serbians because of outbreak of World War I in summer 1914, was now re-opened and regular train connections were established. This ment the re-opening the Berlin-Baghdad railway connection, allowing to send the troops and supplies from Germany of Austria-Hungary directly to Bulgaria and the Ottoman Empire, causing a significant advantage for Central Powers forces fighting on the Mesopotamian Front.

The victory was massively praised and celebrated in Bulgaria as an important successes in the war. The Bulgarian tsar Ferdinand I and his wife Eleonora came to Niš in January 1916 by the restored railway line and accommodated themselves in the Palace of Niš, former seat of the Serbian government. At this time the German Emperor Wilhelm II also visited the city and both monarchs attended on a military parade here. Battle of Niš also marked the creating of Bulgarian occupation zone in Serbia.

The city was recaptured at the very end of World War I on 11 October 1918, after almost three years, by Serbian and French troops under the command of General Petar Bojović.

== See also ==
- History of Niš
- Fall of Belgrade (1915)
- Morava Offensive
- Berlin–Baghdad railway

== Books ==
- Mirčetić, Dragoljub (1994c). Vojna istorija Niša [Military history of Niš]. Vol. 3. Prosveta.
- Ferro, Marc (1989). The Great War, 1914–1918. Hippocrene Books Inc. ISBN 978-0880294492.
- Pavlović, Živko G. (2017). . Serbia's war with Austria-Hungary, Germany and Bulgaria in 1915 (in Serbian). Belgrade: Медија центар "Одбрана". p. 955. ISBN 978-86-3350-557-4.
- Peychev, Atanas (1984). 1300 Years on Guard. Sofia: Military Publishing House. p. 277.
- Rauchensteiner, M.; Kay, A.J. (2014). The First World War and the End of the Habsburg Monarchy, 1914-1918. Online access: OAPEN Open Research Library. V&r Academic. ISBN 978-3-205-79588-9.
- Živković, Mihailo (1998). Defense of Belgrade (1914 - 1915) (in Serbian). Belgrade: Finex. p. 392. ISBN 978-86-8232-508-6.
