= Vrapce =

Vrapce may refer to:

- Vrapce, Medveđa, town in the municipality of Medveđa, Serbia
- Vrapče (disambiguation), several settlements in Bosnia, Croatia and Serbia
