= Battle of Niš =

Several battles have been fought in and around Niš, thus Battle of Niš (Serbian: Битка код Ниша) may refer to:

- Battle of Naissus (268 or 269), fought between the Roman Empire and the Goths
- Battle of Niš (1443), fought between a Christian alliance (Hungary, Poland and Serbia) against the Ottoman Empire
- Battle of Niš (1689), fought between Austria and the Ottoman Empire
- Battle of Niš (1809), fought between Serbian Revolutionary forces and the Ottoman Empire
- Battle of Niš (1878), fought between Serbia and the Ottoman Empire
- Battle of Niš (1915), fought between Serbia and Bulgaria
- Air battle over Niš, a confrontation between air forces of the Soviet Union and the United States in 1944
