= Ilija Gojković =

Serbian military commander and Minister of Defence

General Ilija Gojković
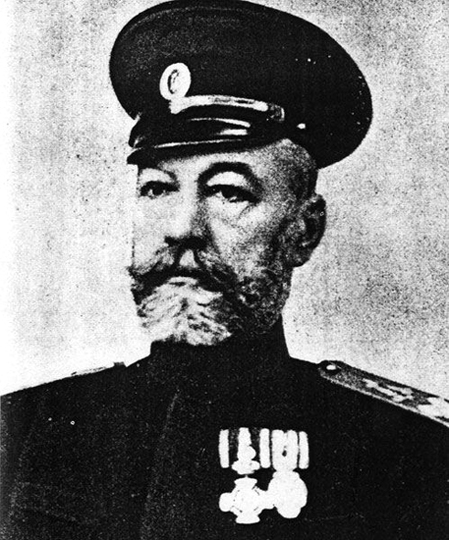

38th Minister of the Army of the Kingdom of Serbia
- In office 4 March 1910 – 11 February 1911
- Monarch: Peter I
- Prime Minister: Stojan Novaković; Nikola Pašić
- Preceded by: Milutin Marinović
- Succeeded by: Stepa Stepanović

Personal details
- Born: 2 August 1854 Drenovac, Principality of Serbia
- Died: 15 February 1917 (aged 62) Ionian Sea, near Sicily, Kingdom of Italy

Military service
- Allegiance: Principality of Serbia; Kingdom of Serbia
- Branch/service: Royal Serbian Army
- Years of service: 1870–1917
- Rank: General
- Unit: 1st Morava Infantry Division; Timok Army
- Battles/wars: Balkan Wars: Battle of Prilep; Battle of Kumanovo; Battle of Monastir; Battle of Bregalnica; World War I: Battle of Cer; Battle of Kolubara

Ilija Gojković (Serbian Cyrillic: Илија Гојковић; 2 August 1854 – 15 February 1917) was a Serbian military commander and Minister of Defence.

He served during the Serbian–Turkish Wars, the Balkan Wars and during the Serbian Campaign (part of the larger Balkans Campaign) during World War I. He became well known for commanding the Serbs in the east around Timok.

== Career ==
Gojković was the Minister of Defence of the Kingdom of Serbia from 4 March 1910 to 24 February 1911. He commanded Morava division 1st ban during the Battle of Cer and was criticized by the commander of the 2nd army, general Stepa Stepanović for lackluster performance on the first day of the battle, but performed well thereafter and contributed significantly to the Serbian victory.

== Death ==
While traveling to the Salonica front on the Italian troopship SS Minas the latter was sunk by a German submarine SM U-39 near Sicily. Gojković reportedly refused to surrender and was killed while shooting back at the surfaced submarine with his service revolver. He drowned in the Ionian Sea.

Gojković was the highest ranking member of the Serbian Army that died in combat during the First World War.

Government offices
Preceded by Milutin Marinović	Minister of Defence; 1910–1911	Succeeded by Stepa Stepanović
