= Fall of Belgrade (1915) =

1915 battle during World War I

- Part of the Serbian Campaign of the Balkans Theatre of World War I
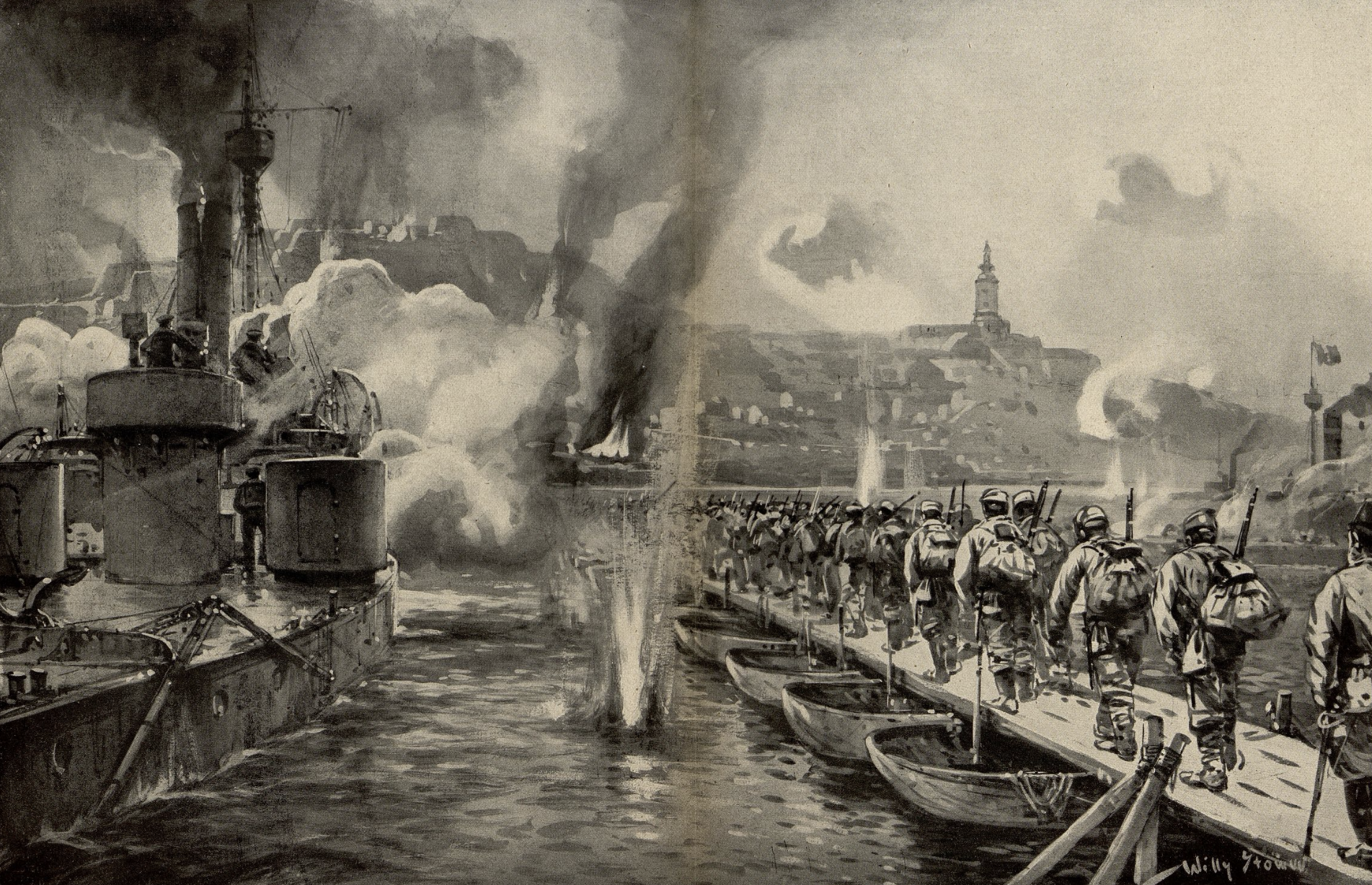
- Austro-Hungarian troops cross the Danube covered by fire from the Danube monitors (illustration by W. Stöwer, 1915)
Date	5–16 October 1915
Location	Belgrade, Kingdom of Serbia, today Serbia 44°49′04″N 20°27′25″E
Result	Central Powers victory
Territorial changes	Austrians capture Belgrade

Belligerents
Serbia	Austria-Hungary; German Empire

Commanders and leaders
(Kingdom of Serbia) Mihailo Živković; (Kingdom of Serbia) Dragutin Gavrilović (WIA)	(Austria-Hungary) Alfred Krauss; (German Empire) August von Mackensen

Units involved
2nd Army; 3rd Army; Timok Army	5th Army; German 11th Army

The Fall of Belgrade (Serbian Cyrillic: Пад Београда, German: Der Fall von Belgrad) was a military engagement between the joint armies of Austria-Hungary and German Empire against Serbia in October 1915, during the Serbian Campaign of 1915 of World War I. After the fighting between 5 and 16 October 1915 Belgrade was finally occupied by Austro-Hungarian Third Army and German Eleventh Army, while successfully establishing two bridgeheads to serve as base for further operations of the Central Powers armies in the Balkans Theatre.

== Prelude ==
=== Serbian campaign ===
After Serbia successfully resisted Austria-Hungary's advances during the Serbian campaign of 1914, the Central Powers launched a joint offensive against Serbia with a combined force of over 600,000 soldiers. They had a massive numerical and technological superiority over the Serbian army, which was heavily outnumbered and lacked adequate supplies and equipment. Belgrade, the capital of the Kingdom of Serbia, itself was shelled by Austro-Hungarian monitors from the Danube on 29 July 1914, as the very first military action of war, and it was later taken by the Austro-Hungarian forces under General Oskar Potiorek on 30 November. On 15 December 1914, it was then re-taken by Serbian troops under Marshal Radomir Putnik.

The goal of the offensive of the Austro-Hungarian units in autumn 1915 was to cross the Danube and the Sava rivers and occupy the Kneževac - Ritopek - Avala hill line. This would attract larger Serbian units to that line, which would enable the attack of the 11th German Army on the Belgrade - Sofia railway line. During that time, the Bulgarian army would advance towards Niš, and cut off the retreat of the Serbian army towards Thessaloniki.

=== Defence of the capital ===
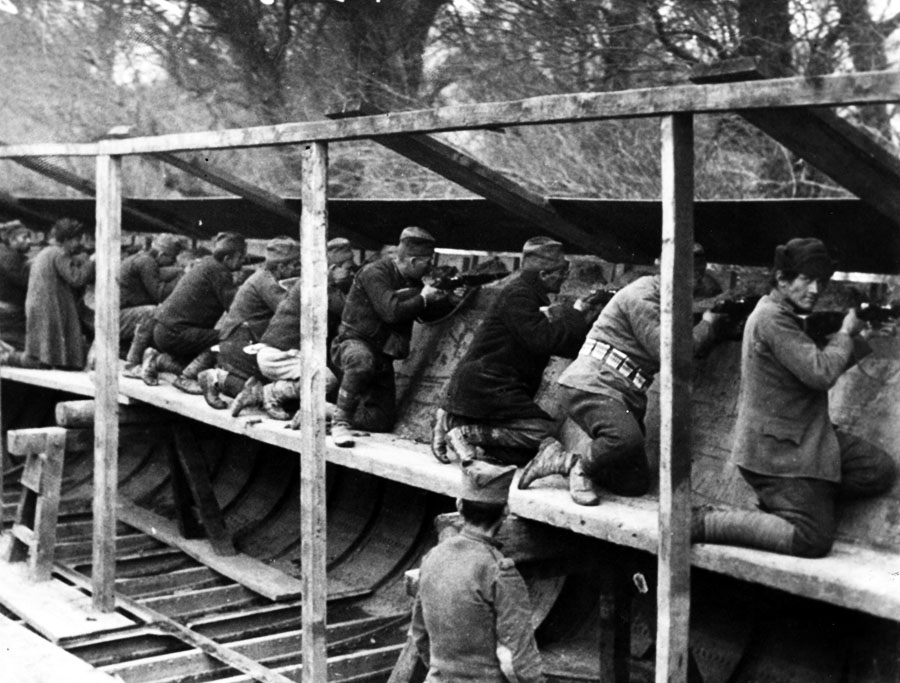
Serbian soldiers inside a fortified barge along the Danube

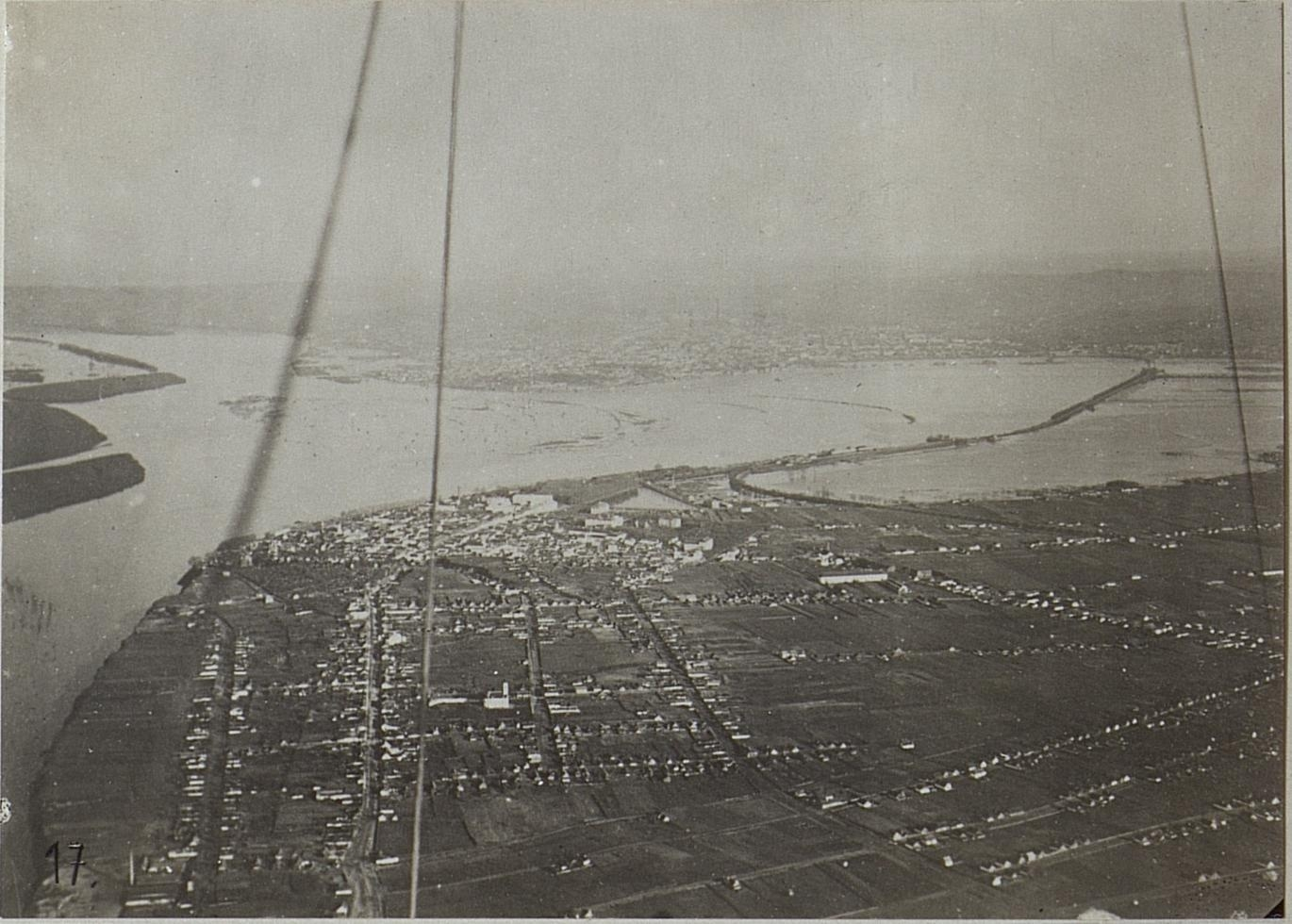
Aerial photo of Zemun and Belgrade from the Austro-Hungarian military aircraft

The width of the front defended by Serbian units was 50 kilometers in front of Belgrade, between Vinča and Ostružnica, and as deep as Torlak. Frontline positions had no protection from enemy artillery bombardment, as well as some more complex defense systems. The strength of the units defending the city consisted of 20 Serbian infantry battalions, 2 cavalry squadrons and 77 artillery cannons of various calibers. Those units were barely enough to cover the width of the front, and the reserves were few. The Danube quay was fortified with two lines of trenches, and the main line of defense was on the railway embankment. The trenches were dug into the quay from which the cobblestones were taken, so that on the edges of the trenches there were brick pillars with an intermediate space, under which the soldiers could sit. Major Dragutin Gavrilović, one of the commanding officers of the city defense, then visited the trenches on the Danube quay and issued an order to abandon them. New trenches were then dug for the kneeling position on the very line of the river bank: German artillery would shooting on their targets aiming the square perimeters, starting a few tens of meters from the shore.

The forces attacking Belgrade were consisted of the Third Austro-Hungarian Army, as well as the German XXII Reserve Corps (Eleventh German Army). The Third Austro-Hungarian Army consisted of 130 infantry battalions, 136 artillery batteries, 4 aircraft divisions, as well as an Imperial and Royal Danube Flotilla with 9 monitors and 20 other ships.

== Battle ==
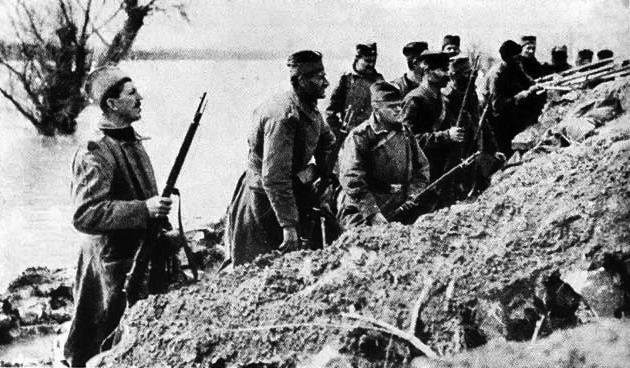
Serbian infantry position near Ada Ciganlija

The attack by Austro-Hungarian and German units began on October 5, 1915. Belgrade was bombarded throughout the day and night with heavy artillery fire. According to some sources, about 30,000 grenades were fired at Belgrade that day. Many settlements were destroyed, the city was covered in smoke and ash and multiple civil casualties appeared. Due to relatively weak resistance from Serbian defenders, the Austro-Hungarian and German forces started to cross the Danube two days later, on October 7, in the area of Ada Ciganlija and at the foot of Kalemegdan Hill, with Belgrade Fortress on the top. In the area of Danube quay, the defenders met them with heavy infantry and artillery fire. The armies clashed in a dozen man-to-man combats with the following advantage of strong Central Powers artillery support. Apart from the Serbian soldiers, the capital city was defended also by civilians, women, children and the elderly, who mostly took weapons from the fallen soldiers.

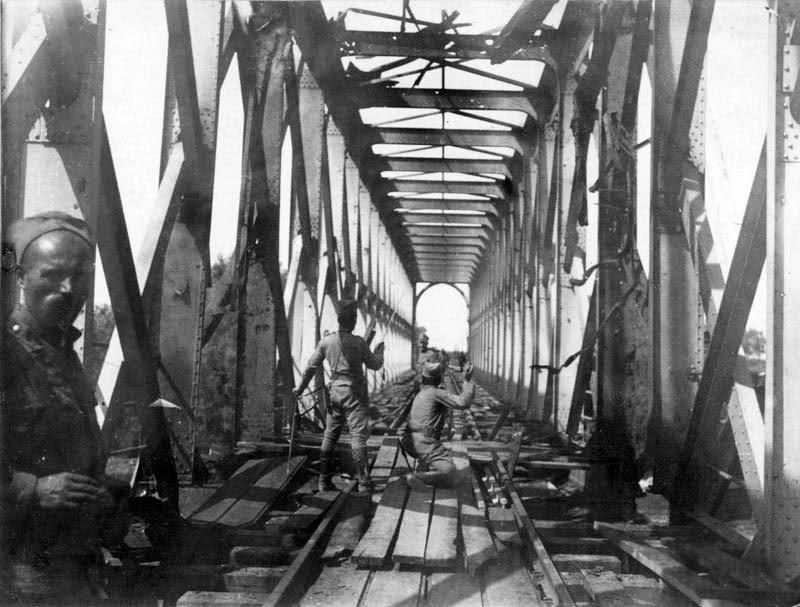
Serbian soldiers on the railway bridge

The desperate fight lasted for four days, during which the defenders had to first retreat from Banatska Street to Cara Dušana Street, and then to Vasa Street. At the same time, the defenders were pushed from Ada Ciganlija and Banovo brdo locations, from where they retreated towards Zvezdara quarter and later seat of Faculty of Law. After the German units took positions in Dedinje Hill, location of the Royal Palace, the Serbians retreated to Avala. Shortly later General Mihailo Živković, the commander of the defense of Belgrade, ordered a Serbian retreat to the line Brestovik - Parcanski visovi.

Despite heavy losses and attacks by a significantly more numerous and superior enemy, the Supreme Command of the Defense of Belgrade ordered further defense of the city by sending reinforcements to the locations of remaining resistance. After the Austro-Hungarians neutralized the Serbian artillery at Kalemegdan and Veliki Vračar hills, Serbians defense of Belgrade could not be sustained and Serbian reinforcements were stopped being sent. Central Powers troops occupied parts of the city by October 8, but the defense did not let up until October 16, after which the Belgrade defense units finally withdrew and the attackers took the full control over the city. A few days before, on October 14, Bulgarian Army attacked Serbia during the Morava Offensive, therefore the Serbian Moravian Division was transferred to the newly opened front.

== Aftermath ==
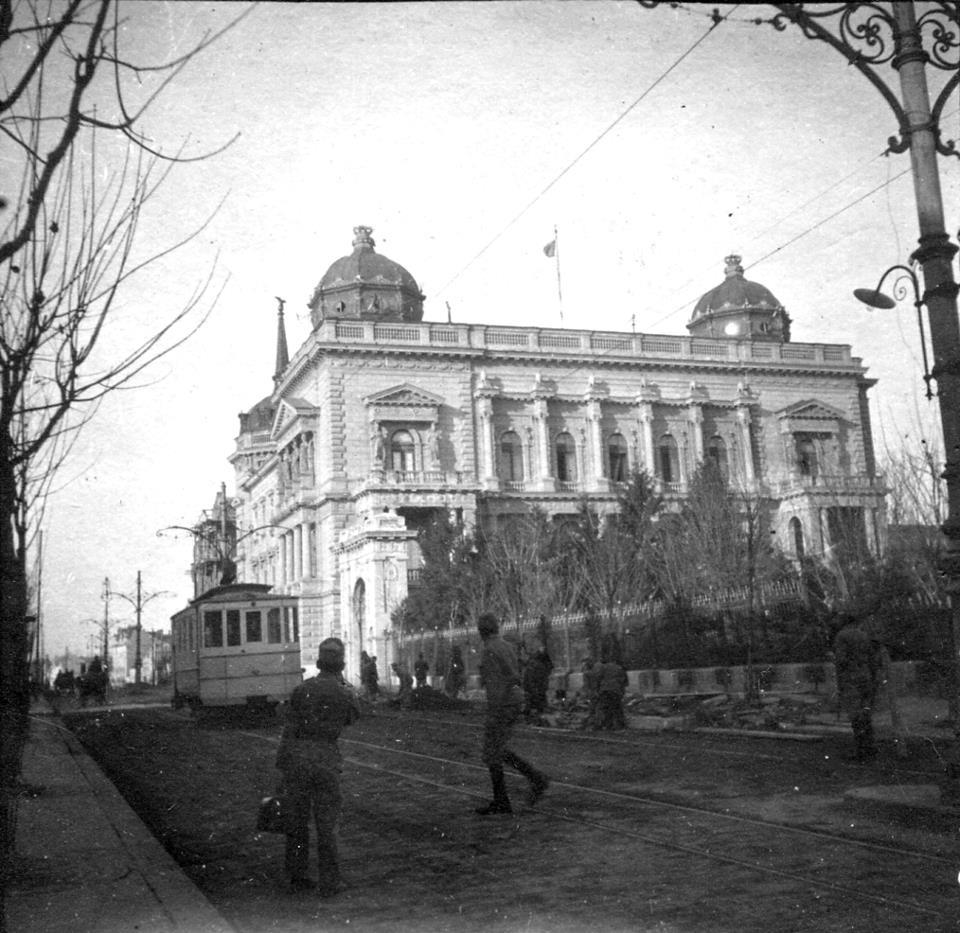
Austro-Hungarian occupying troops in Belgrade, October 1915

After eleven days of intense fighting, just about eight thousand inhabitants remained in Belgrade, a smaller part of the population, while the greater part retreated with the army on the beginning of the so-called Great Retreat. However, since the enemy caught up with them, a number of them were forced to return to Belgrade. In the next weeks the Serbian front collapsed and the Serbian Royal Army escaped the country heading to the mountains in Albania and later being evacuated to British-held Corfu island.

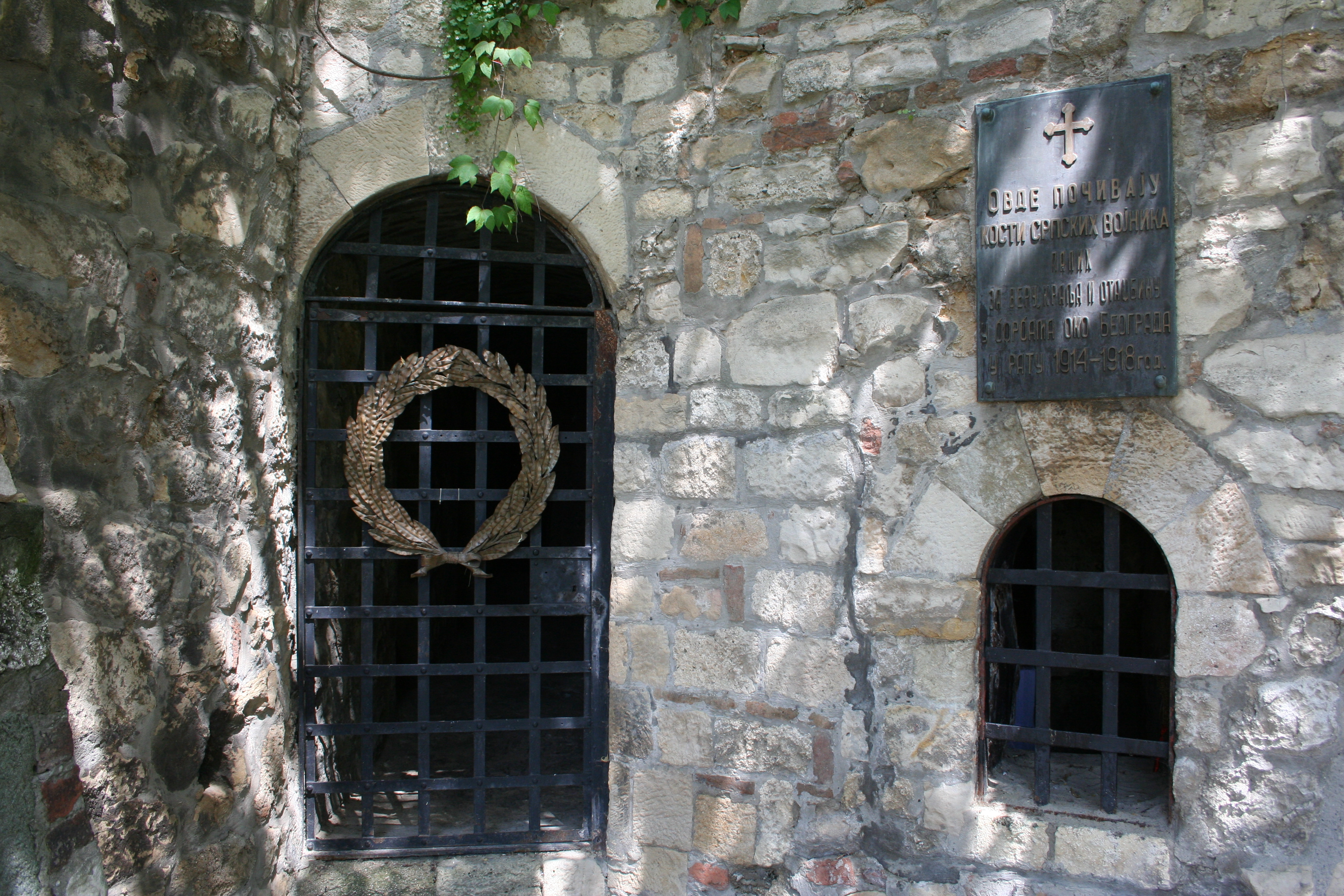
The tomb of the Serbian defenders of the Belgrade Fortress, behind the Church of Saint Petka

Most of the defenders of Belgrade, under the command of Major Dragutin Gavrilović, were killed, and Gavrilović himself was seriously wounded. The heroism of the Serbian army during the defense of the city was worthy of respect even from the enemy, so the German Field Marshal August von Mackensen ordered the erection of a monument to the heroes of the defense of Belgrade after the capturing of the city. The monument carries the sign in both German and Serbian, Serbian heroes rest here.

The city was liberated at the very end of World War I on 1 November 1918, after more than three years, by Serbian and French troops under the command of Marshal Louis Franchet d'Espérey of France and Crown Prince Alexander of Serbia.

== In Media ==
The fighting around Belgrade during World War I and its final fall in 1915 are described in the books of Serbian authors Živojin Pavlović or Dobrica Ćosić.

The song "Last Dying Breath" from Sabaton's 2016 album The Last Stand is about the battle.

== See also ==
- History of Belgrade
- Bombardment of Belgrade (1914)
- Morava Offensive

== Books ==
- Živković, Mihailo (1998). Defense of Belgrade (1914 - 1915) (in Serbian). Belgrade: Finex. p. 392. ISBN 978-86-8232-508-6.
- Pavlović, Živko G. (2017). . Serbia's war with Austria-Hungary, Germany and Bulgaria in 1915 (in Serbian). Belgrade: Медија центар "Одбрана". p. 955. ISBN 978-86-3350-557-4.
- The Story of the Great War (Complete). Library of Alexandria. ISBN 978-1-4655-2888-9.
- Gumz, J.E. (2014). The Resurrection and Collapse of Empire in Habsburg Serbia, 1914–1918: Volume 1. Cambridge Military Histories. Cambridge University Press. ISBN 978-1-107-68972-5.
- Mitrović, A. (2007). Serbia's Great War, 1914-1918. Central European studies. Purdue University Press. ISBN 978-1-55753-476-7.
- Jordan, David (2008). The Balkans, Italy & Africa 1914–1918: From Sarajevo to the Piave and Lake Tanganyika. London: Amber Books. ISBN 978-1-906626-14-3.
- Neiberg, M.S. (2011). Arms and the Man: Military History Essays in Honor of Dennis Showalter. History of Warfare. Brill. ISBN 978-90-04-20694-6.
- Rauchensteiner, M.; Kay, A.J. (2014). The First World War and the End of the Habsburg Monarchy, 1914-1918. Online access: OAPEN Open Research Library. V&r Academic. ISBN 978-3-205-79588-9.
