= Stepa Stepanović =

Serbian field marshal (1856–1929)

Vojvoda Stepa Stepanović
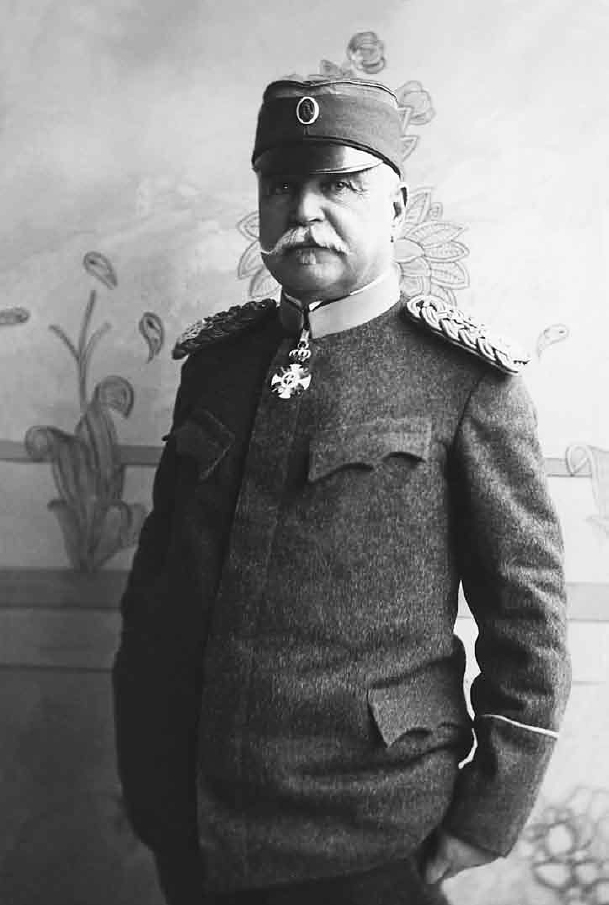
- Stepa Stepanović in 1919

Minister of Army
- In office 24 February 1911 – 22 May 1912
- Prime Minister: Nikola Pašić; Milovan Milovanović
- Preceded by: Ilija Gojković
- Succeeded by: Radomir Putnik
- In office 30 March 1908 – 23 December 1908
- Prime Minister: Nikola Pašić; Petar Velimirović
- Preceded by: Radomir Putnik
- Succeeded by: Mihailo Živković

Personal details
- Born: Stepan Stepanović; 11 March 1856 Kumodraž, Principality of Serbia
- Died: 27 April 1929 (aged 73) Čačak, Kingdom of Serbs, Croats and Slovenes
- Resting place: Čačak Cemetery
- Spouse: Jelena Stepanović (1881–1929; his death)
- Children: Milica Stepanović; Danica Stepanović
- Education: Military Academy Serbia
- Profession: Army officer
- Awards: Order of the Star of Karađorđe with Swords; Order of St. Sava; Order of Saint Stanislaus; Order of the Crown of Italy; Order of the Redeemer; Order of the Bath
- Nickname: Stepa

Military service
- Allegiance: Principality of Serbia; Kingdom of Serbia; Kingdom of Serbs, Croats and Slovenes
- Branch/service: Army of the Principality of Serbia; Army of the Kingdom of Serbia; Army of the Kingdom of Serbs, Croats and Slovenes
- Years of service: 1874–1920
- Rank: Field Marshal
- Commands: 2nd Serbian Army
- Battles/wars: Serbian-Turkish Wars; Serbo-Bulgarian War; First Balkan War; Second Balkan War; World War I

Stepan "Stepa" Stepanović OLH, KCB, DSO (Serbian Cyrillic: Степан Степа Степановић, pronounced [stɛ̌ːpa stɛpǎːnoʋitɕ]; 11 March [O.S. 28 February] 1856 – 27 April 1929) was a Serbian military commander who fought in the Serbo-Turkish War, the Serbo-Bulgarian War, the First Balkan War, the Second Balkan War and World War I. Having joined the Serbian military in 1874, he fought against the forces of the Ottoman Empire in 1876. Over the following years, he climbed up the ranks of the Serbian Army and fought against Bulgarian forces in 1885. He eventually became the Serbian Minister of War in April 1908 and was responsible for instituting changes in the Serbian Army.

Stepanović commanded Serbian forces during the two Balkan Wars and led the Serbian Second Army during World War I. After Battle of Cer he was promoted to second Field Marshal. He died in Čačak on 27 April 1929.

== Early childhood and education ==
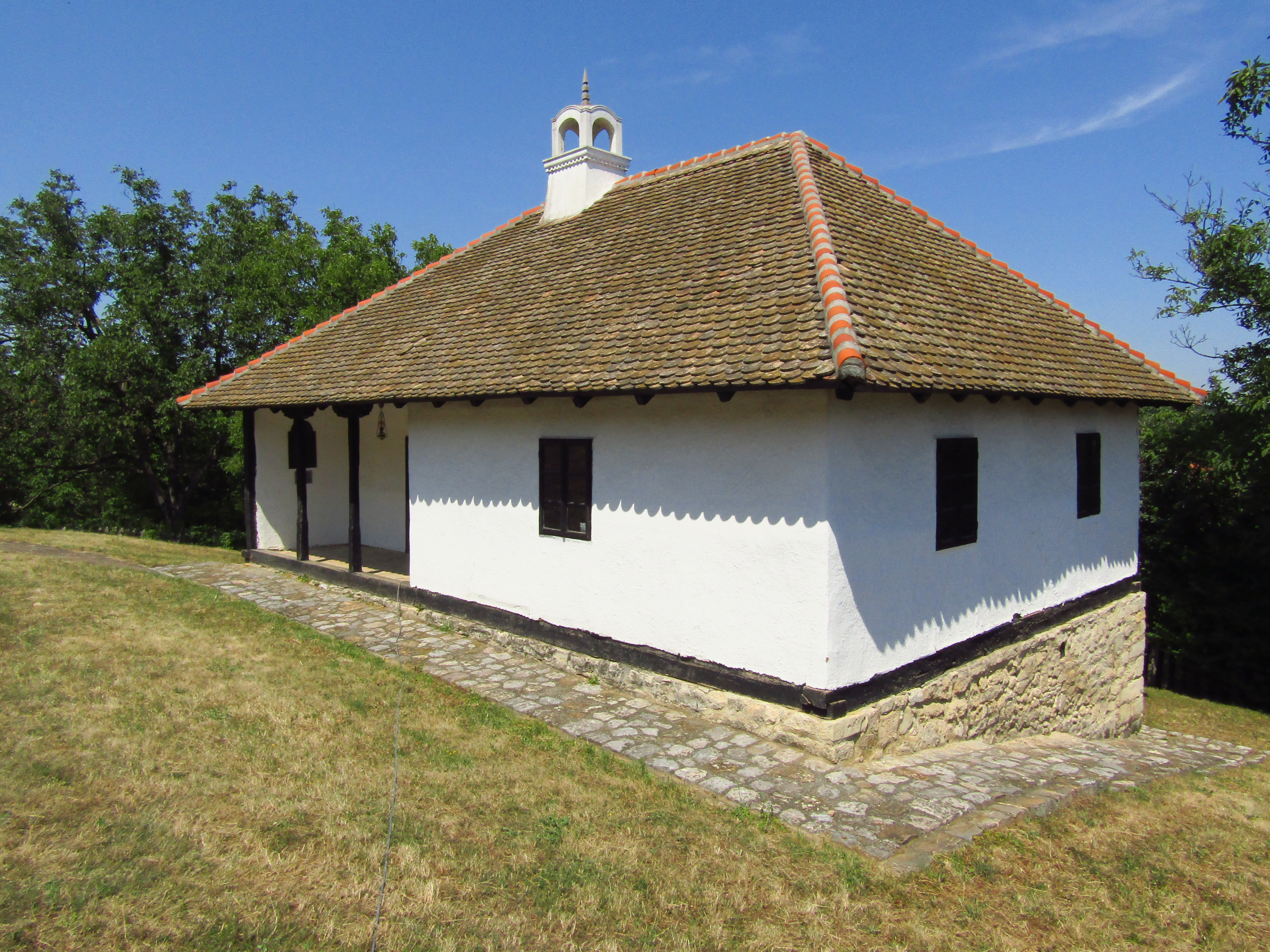
Stepanović's childhood home in Kumodraž (Belgrade)

Stepan "Stepa" Stepanović was born on 28 February 1856 in the village of Kumodraž, near Belgrade. He was the fourth child and third son of Ivan and Radojka Stepanović (née Nikolić). Stepanović was named after his grandfather Stepan, from whom his family's surname originated. There are two theories of his family origins. The first states that Stepanovic's ancestors, who were known as Živanović, came from the regions of Bosnia and Lika. The second theory is that his ancestors came from the vicinity of Leskovac and Pirot during the Great Serb Migrations.

Due to housework, Stepanović's mother had little time for him and often left him in the care of her mother-in-law. Prior to attending primary school, he looked after cattle and was once hurt badly by a bull. Stepanović finished triennial primary school in Kumodraž and attended gymnasium in Captain Miša's Mansion. To finish his schooling, he often served wealthier Belgrade families. He finished his first year of school with good grades and continued receiving good grades throughout the rest of his education. In September 1874, Stepanović enlisted in the XI class of the Belgrade artillery school instead of attending his sixth year of gymnasium. He did not have to write an entrance exam because he had completed five years of gymnasium. His class had twenty-nine cadets.

At the time, the Belgrade artillery school possessed a technical character and paid much attention to knowledge of mathematics, a subject in which Stepanović always performed poorly. Stepanović was also not very good in foreign languages, although he read Russian and French literature. After Herzegovina Uprising broke out, the Principality of Serbia began preparing for war with the Ottoman Empire and the Belgrade artillery school initiated a program of practical martial training. In September 1875, Stepanović and his classmates all received the rank of corporal. After passing an exam, Stepanović became junior sergeant in May 1876. In June 1876, war erupted between Serbia and Ottoman Turkish forces in the Balkans, most of whom were Albanians from Kosovo. Stepanović and the entire XI class quickly received the ranks of sergeant and were sent to the frontline.

== Serbo-Turkish Wars ==
Stepanović arrived in Kragujevac on 14 May 1876. Here, he was assigned to orderly officer duty in the headquarters of the Šumadija Division, commanded by Colonel Ljubomir Uzun-Mirković, whose orders were carried by Stepanović. The Šumadija division was the main part of the Moravian Army, but after a change of battle plans, it was divided in several squadrons. Stepanović was assigned to Uzun-Mirković's squadron, which had orders to help the Knjaževac Army take Babina Glava and Bela Palanka in order to stop the arrival of Ottoman reinforcements to Niš. Eventually, Babina Glava was taken and Stepanović was noted by Uzun-Mirković for "being very agile and for good riding." Soon after, the Ottomans launched a counter-offensive against Uzun-Mirković's squadron, which retreated to Pandrilo. The Ottomans attacked Pandrilo on 19 July, beginning a battle in which Stepanović actively participated. Stepanović's participation alongside regular Serbian soldiers raised moral and helped turn the tide of the battle. This experience affected Stepanović greatly and he often resorted to fighting alongside other Serbian soldiers to raise their moral.

After the fall of Knjaževac, Stepanović and his squadron moved from Deligrad to Sokobanja in order to prevent the Ottomans from reaching the Morava Valley. In Sokobanja, Serb forces regrouped and formed the IV Army Corps, under the command of Colonel Đura Horvatović. Stepanović subsequently joined this unit.

The IV Army Corps marched across Kurilovo and reached Vinik where it attacked Ottoman positions. It then moved on to Deligrad, where it arrived on 7 September. The IV Army Corps clashed with the Turks on 11 September near Krevet, in a battle which ended indecisively.

An armistice between Serb and Ottoman Turkish forces was declared 1 November 1876. On 1 December, Stepanović was awarded the gold medal for Bravery and was promoted to the rank of second lieutenant. On 13 February 1877, he was appointed commander of the 3rd Company of the 3rd Battalion of the Serbian Army. Later, Stepanović participated in the capture of Pirot. Under the overall command of General Jovan Belimarković, Stepanović and his 300-strong force attacked the left flank of Nišor, one of two locations that the Ottomans had fortified in the town. Between 26 and 27 September, Stepanović's unit passed unnoticed around Nišor and took Mali vrh. On the morning of 27 September, when the main Serbian attack began, his squad opened fire on Nišor, confusing the Ottomans stationed there. Afterwards, Pirot was captured. One soldier from Stepanović's unit said: "I find that, if I’m not wrong, our action struck the main blow to the Turkish position on Nišor and had resolved the fate of Pirot." Stepanović was later awarded the Order of St. Svetislav III Class with Swords and Ribbon, his favourite of all awards he had received throughout his career because he considered himself "[the] first to have entered the Turkish trench."

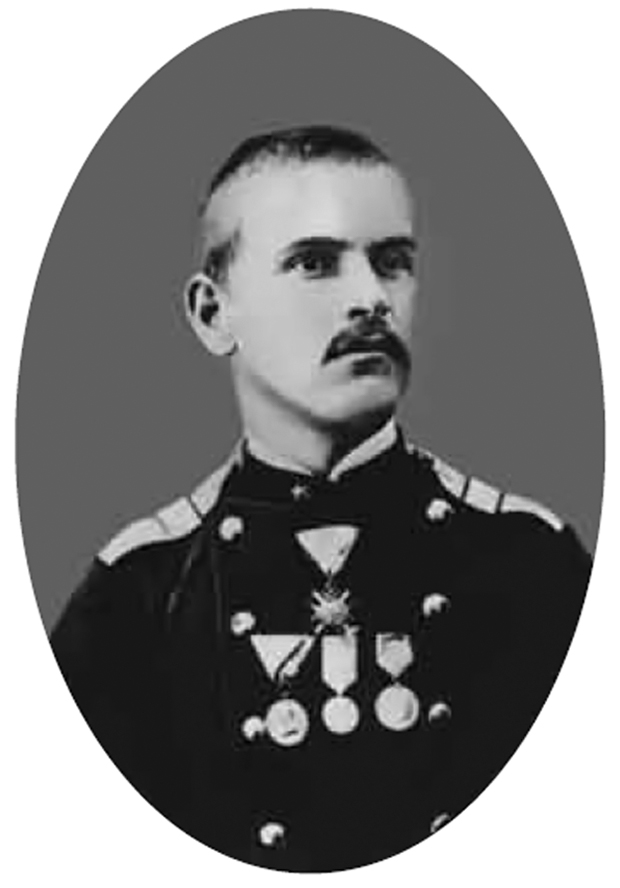
Portrait of Stepa Stepanović during his first year in Artillery school

On 3 December, the Šumadija Corps began its march from Pirot to Niš in two echelon formations. During this march, Stepanović commanded a half-battalion of infantry and some cavalry that moved across the difficult terrain of Suva Planina. Nevertheless, all of his men survived the trek and appeared ready for battle. Stepanović later stated that the march across the mountain was his toughest assignment in the war.

On 23 January 1878, the Serbian high command ordered the Šumadija division to capture the town of Vranje. The Šumadija division then drove the Ottomans from Poljanica and defeated Grdelička klisura. On 25 January, Stepanović became commander of a volunteer squad which armed local Serbs in Poljanica. At the battle for Vranje several days later, Stepanović attacked the Ottomans from the north of the town at Devotin.

== Peacetime ==
Once the war ended, Stepanović took additional classes at the Belgrade Military Academy to finish his schooling, completing them all by 1880. In September of that year, he requested a transfer to Kragujevac. There, he gained command of the 2nd Company of 3rd Battalion of the Serbian Army. In October, he became commander of the 1st Company in the same battalion.

In Kragujevac, Stepanović met his future wife Jelena, the daughter of the city's chief, Velislav Milanović. The two married on 25 July 1881. Their first child, Milica, was born on 21 April 1882. The following year Jelena gave birth to the couple's second daughter, Danica. Both of Stepanović's daughters went on to marry officers, Milica marrying second lieutenant Krsta Dragomirović and Danica marrying 1st Class captain Jovica Jovičić, who later became a division general in the Serbian Army.

In his first official evaluation in the last quarter of 1880, a special military commission wrote described Stepanović as:

Apprehensive. He shows talent in general, and is special in the history of the Serbian people. He has a determined and bold character and has temper. He understands easily and is fast to act with good results. Healthy, strong, agile and, for practical service, able. He is a very good marksman, rider and swimmer. If there is a need, he can command a company, he has knowledge and he can transfer it to his subordinates. In the rest of the official rules he is also good; useful for administration and monetary service. He works ardently. To the younger he is strict and righteous, to the equals he is gregarious, and to the elders very kind and thoughtful.

On 1 September 1882, Stepanović was promoted to the rank of infantry lieutenant and he became a commander in Užice, where he remained until 13 February 1883, when he returned to Kragujevac. Upon his arrival in Kragujevac, he was appointed as military adjutant in the Šumadija Infantry Regiment. That same year, Serbia listed made military exercises mandatory in gymnasium programs. Stepanović subsequently became a teacher of military exercises in the First Kragujevac Gymnasium. He remained in this position until 1886.

== Serbo-Bulgarian War (1885) ==
During the Battle of Slivnitsa, Stepanović commanded the 1st Company of the 2nd Battalion of the Šumadija division. His unit attacked the village of Vrapče and forced Bulgarian forces to retreat. In a report that Stepanović sent to the commander of the 12th Regiment a lack of coordination between divisions, regiments and battalions of the Serbian Army is perceptible.

Several days later, Stepanović became commander of the 1st Battalion in the 12th Regiment and together with troops from another unit attacked the weakened Bulgarian center on Slivnitsa. The Bulgarians began retreating, allowing Serb forces to take over region around the village of Aldomirovtsi. In his report, Stepanović wrote about his soldiers: "The behavior of the soldiers in this battles was excellent because they showed great curability despite moving over the open field during crossfire. The behavior of the officers was satisfactory in regard of courage and good command of the troops."

With Serbian forces being pushed out of Bulgaria, King Milan ordered a general retreat of the Serbian Army towards Pirot on 19 November. Three days later, Bulgarian forces marched towards the town and launched an attack on Neškov vis. Stepanović's 12th Regiment was forced to retreat. Stepanović later reported: "...I moved along to the hospital towards where bulks of our troops retreated. No effort of the elders could bring them back. More soldiers followed them and then that ridiculous mob pushed away officers who tried to stop them."

== Rise ==
With the end of the Serbo-Bulgarian war, Stepanović returned to Kragujevac, where he stayed until November 1886. In Kragujevac, he commanded a company of the 10th regiment. At the end of 1886, he was promoted to the rank of II class infantry captain. He was an aspirant in the Serbian General Staff from 22 November 1886 to 22 October 1888. At the meeting which was held at the end of 1888, the General Staff's commission stated ″that II class captain Mr. Stepanović showed enough qualification and proof for headquarters' service", concluding that "he should be approved to start an exam this winter for the rank of I class captain.″

In March 1889, Stepanović reported for this exam, and the commission gave him permission on 2 April to start. From 2–6 April, Stepanović completed the theoretic part of his exam in twelve subjects. He was released of doing practical part of exam, because he received very good grade on headquarters' journeys and missions. Shortly before the exam, he became the executive of Drina divisional area. After his exams he moved to Valjevo. On 17 April 1889, he became I Class captain.

From 29 March to 15 April 1892, Stepanović wrote and successfully passed an exam for the rank major in the same time as Milutin Milanović and Živojin Mišić. Stepanović became commander of the 5th Battalion in Požega on 13 September 1892. He was promoted to the rank of major on 8 May of the following year. On 14 August, he was moved to Valjevo to once again serve as the executive of the Drina divisional area. He stayed in Valjevo until 20 October 1895, when he was moved to Belgrade. Stepanović stayed in Belgrade for five months, where he was commander of the 7th Battalion. He also became a part-time professor of military history at the Belgrade Military Academy. On 30 March 1897, he became acting commander of the 6th Infantry Regiment in Belgrade. On 11 May, he was promoted to the rank of colonel and two days later he became commander of the 6th Infantry Regiment. Stepanović became Chief of the General Staff in the Ministry of Defense on 27 October 1898. He served in this position until 15 March 1899, when he became an executive of the general military department of the Ministry of Defense. Although he didn't like to work indoors, he made an excellent impression on members of the ministry and was remembered as being very strict and punctual. He was transferred again to Valjevo on 17 October 1900, where he became commander of an infantry brigade in the Drina Division. Because of a misunderstanding on 11 November, he was transferred to Zaječar and assigned as commander of an infantry brigade in the Timok Division. He liked this position and said: ″Troop for an officer is the same as water to a fish, and especially a headquarters officer. There he can show what he knows and he can show results. The office kills the spirit, drains the strength and changes man into mechanism.″

On 18 August 1901, Stepanović was promoted to headquarters colonel, and on 11 November he became deputy executive of the active military command of the Serbian Army. He was served in this position until 15 December 1902, when he became an executive of the General Staff. Later, King Alexander I decorated him with Order of the Cross of Takovo II class. Stepanović continued in his role as a professor of military history, lecturing Napoleonic warfare from the period 1796–1805. He was also the editor of military magazine known as Warrior (Serbian: Ratnik).

The May Overthrow which occurred on 28/29 May 1903 did not affect Stepanović's career. After the overthrow, he became section head of the common department in the Ministry of Defense, and then became commander of the Šumadija Division. Because of these promotions, many historians have come to believe that Stepanović was on the side of the conspirators that overthrew the Obrenović dynasty despite his stated neutrality on the matter. After coming to power, Peter I decorated Stepanović with the Order of the Star of Karađorđe III degree on 29 June 1904. Emulating General Đura Horvatić, Stepanović then instituted Prussian-style military drills in his division and punished every irregularity, inaccuracy, legal offence and confiscation of state property.

In the spring of 1906 in Kragujevac, where Stepanović was garrisoned as commander of the Šumadija Division, a so-called corporal counter conspiracy occurred. Some historians believe that the conspiracy was triggered by Stepanović's strict regime. The conspiracy involved about thirty officers of the Kragujevac garrison who had planned to take several important public buildings in the town and then to arrest Stepanović. When the plot was uncovered on 30 April, Stepanović had 31 officers arrested. When expressed a desire to have more arrested, he was stopped by Minister of Defense Radomir Putnik.

Stepanović was deeply shook by the conspiracy and later declared:

"It is a sore point of my whole career. I had many tough things in my life, I swallowed injustice and derecognition, they offended me and neglected me, but nothing touched me more like that thing. I feel sorrow for those young people who were misled by faithless and elevated speculators because of their army career, where they could have been of great benefit to the people and fatherland. But, I could not do anything to help."

== Ministry and preparations for the Balkan Wars ==
Stepa Stepanović was elevated to the rank of general on 29 June 1907, but stayed as commander of the Šumadija divisional area. Nikola Pašić formed a new government on 12 April 1908 and Stepanović became the Minister of Army. During his mandate, he tried to modernize the military and to remodel old Mauser rifles. He also had new artillery be bought from France and supplied to the Serbian Army. When the army attempted to order machine guns, Stepanović took a different, more conservative approach, as Colonel Vlajić, who worked in Stepanović's cabinet, wrote:

"I've had hassle acquiring machine guns. This new weapon, which all armies were armed with, needed to be introduced in the army and I was trying to get certain amount for each regiment, but the minister Stepa said to me one day: I, myself, love more one platoon of shooters rather than your machine guns. Please do not patronize me that one machine gun can replace one platoon of infantry."

In October 1908, after the annexation of Bosnia by Austria-Hungary, massive protests erupted in Serbia and Montenegro. Large numbers of citizens demanded that war be declared against the Austria-Hungarians. Stepanović responded by warning that the country and the army were not ready for war, and that both needed to undertake great amounts of diplomatic, financial and military training. His statements provoked a great amount of criticism from many sides, even in the Serbian press. Consequently, he was dismissed as Minister of Army and became a minister without portfolio at the beginning of 1909. Later that year, he actively assisted Putnik in preparing the Serbian Army for a future war. At the beginning of 1910, Stepanović became commander of the Morava divisional area and undertook the task of preparing the division for armed combat.

At the beginning of March 1911, Stepanović became Minister of Army again. Soon after, Prince Aleksandar Karađorđević became suspicious of Stepanović, whom he believed to be a sympathizer of commander Dragutin Dimitrijević Apis, the leader of the May Overthrow who was said to have wanted a foreign monarch on the Serbian throne. Consequently, the prince rushed to Stepanović and requested that Apis and General Staff major Milovan Milovanović Pilac be transferred from Belgrade. Stepanović responded by saying that he would mention it to the King Peter and allow him to decide whether the two men should be transferred. The prince then unsuccessfully offered his resignation to King Peter.

When Stepanović became Minister of Army for the second time, the government of Serbia realized that the Great Powers intended to divide the Balkan and that the Christian population of the Ottoman Empire was on the verge of rebellion. During his term, Serbia signed several defense agreements with other Balkan countries and created the Balkan League. Stepanović, alongside General Radomir Putnik and Colonel Živojin Mišić, developed plans for mobilization, concentration and strategic development of the Serbian Army for a war against Turkey. In the fall of 1912, the government of Milovan Milovanović resigned after his death and when Marko Trifković formed a new government, Putnik became the new Minister of Defense.

== First Balkan War ==
=== First operations ===
With the start of the First Balkan War, Stepa Stepanović became commander of the 60,000-strong Second Army, which possessed 84 cannons. Concentrated in the Kyustendil–Dupnitsa area, it contained the 1st Timok Infantry Division and the Bulgarian Seventh Rila infantry Division. Its mission was to attack the Turkish rear before the First Army. Informing the Serbian troops that the Seventh Rila Division became part of the Army, Stepanović said: ″I look with confidence at our future work and strongly believe in success, because for centuries separated and now fraternized and embraced, closest brothers, Serbs and Bulgarians represent an irresistible force that will crush all hurdles and liberate downtrodden brothers.″

On 17 October 1912, Putnik informed Stepanović of Serbia's declaration of war against the Ottoman Empire. He ordered his army to move closer to the Ottoman border, but not to cross it until further notice. However, the Bulgarian high command ordered the commander of the Rila Division, Georgi Todorov, to cross the Ottoman border and attack Carevo selo and Gornja Džumaja, which he managed to capture. Stepanović congratulated them with the words: ″Hurray heroes of the Seventh division.″

On 18 October, Timok Division started to attack Ottoman positions in direction Rujen-Crni vrh, and next day they captured Crni vrh on the orders of Stepanović. On 21 October, the Serbian high command ordered the Timok Division to advanced towards Kumanovo. Uninformed that the battalion, commanded by Mayor Dobrosav Milenković, had already captured Kriva Palanka without a fight, Stepanović ordered all the necessary maneuvers for capturing the town. This wasted a lot of time, but majority of the division managed to pass through Krivorečka gorge without any resistance. In the early noon, Cavalry Regiment started a fight 5–6 km away from Stracin and managed to capture it at nightfall. Yet again, Stepanović hasn't been informed about this event, and next day he ordered his troops to capture Stracin, which wasted a lot of time. After this event, communication was established between the First and the Second armies and the road to Kumanovo was open.

=== Battle of Kumanovo ===
Having not received any order about amassing of the enemy at Kumanovo, general Stepanović ordered Timok Division to take a march towards Kumonovo on 23 October at 6 a.m. At the same time he ordered he commanded the Seventh Division to take over Kočani on 23 October and then to spare some of its forces and send it toward Štip. On 23 October, in the morning, Timok Division attacked Kratovo and thus began the Battle of Kumanovo.

However, general Todorov obeyed the orders from his High Command, so he only sent one battalion of ten batteries to take over Kočani, which was defended by an entire division. Stepanović, while the Timok Division was on the march, received the note that from Ovče polje and Kočani, strong Ottoman force was marching toward Kratovo. Based on this, he hurried commander of Timok Division to take over Kratovo and to establish defenses toward south side. However, after they arrived in the Kratovo area, colonel Kondić decided that division is tired and should spend the night. Using this, Ottomans took over Crni vrh, which was guarded only by Bulgarian Komita department and one company of Serbs.

Stepanović did not like the work of both divisions and reported this to Supreme Command. He received answer that 7th Division should unconditionally take over Kočani and Timok Division Crni Vrh. Meanwhile, Stepanović found out that during 23 October, there was battle at Kumanovo. He was surprised by this and was worried about the position of Timok Division, but still looked for a way to help the First army. He ordered Timok Division to take over Crni vrh on 24 October, but this was done tomorrow on 25 October.

The next day, High Command informed Stepanović that at the request of the Bulgarian government it was decided that Timok Division should be putt at their disposal, provided that ″he still manage both divisions.″ He immediately gave 14th Serbian Regiment to the 7th Rila Division and ordered general Todorov to steer his forces towards the mouth of the Bregalnica river in order to stop Ottoman retreat towards Prilep, and then he asked for permission to move from Kriva Palanka to Štip in order to command more easily operation.

However, after he arrived in Kratovo he received a dispatch from general Todorov in which he informed that he received the orders from his own High Command to move his forces towards Serez and Demir Hisar, which he already ordered. After reading this, Stepanović moved back to Kriva Palanka to prepare certain forces to aid Bulgarians.

=== Siege of Adrianople ===
General Stepa Stepanović arrived with his headquarters in place called Mustafa Pasha (railway station outside of Adrianople) on 6 November 1912. Immediately he contacted General Nikola Ivanov, Supreme Commander of the Bulgarian Second army and siege troops. His HQ was placed in Mustafa Pasha, where Ivanov's was also stationed.

The armistice was signed on 3.December 1912. However, Stepanović didn't want his army to lose concentration. He demanded maximum discipline and readiness, even on Christmas Eve. During armistice, Stepanović managed to improve the supply of his army. Bulgarian Supreme Command accepted to supply Serbian Second army, but Stepanović wasn't satisfied with quality. so he demanded that the quality of bread, meat and other articles improve. Because he didn't come to agreement with Bulgarian command, he asked Serbian Supreme Command to send supply in order to ″preserve the health and morale of soldiers.″ After the two months of preparation, on 24 March 1913 begun 3-day battle for capturing Adrianople. His Timok Division captured whole northern sector of the battlefield in only 45 minutes without artillery backup and pulle the bulk of Adrianople fortress artillery fire.

At the end of the day, it was decided that tomorrow at night, attack should be launched in order to capture antipersonnel obstacles. When attack commenced, on the front of Timok Division, Ottomans tried to recapture their positions, but they were unsuccessful. General Stepanović looked attack live from high ground behind Danube Division. Nikola Aranđelović, who was in charge of army telegraph, described the atmosphere:

Standing alone, like statue, General Stepanović transferred himself in the trenches of his countrymen and peasants from 7th company: people from Kumodraž, Mokri Lug, Avala and Kosmaj, and from time to time he clapped his hand and shouts: – Bravo my sons, bravo my heroes.

At 5.30 am, Stepanović ordered Serbian troops to move in decisive attack on the front line, in order to help Bulgarian push on eastern sector, which fell around 8 am. At 8.30 am, two Ottoman officers came to Serbian 20th regiment to negotiate the surrender on the account of Shukri Pasha. Having not receiving any response, Pasha sent his adjutant to 20th regiment with message that Shukri Pasha wants to negotiate with General Stepanović. Stepanović replied that he was not authorized by the commander to conduct negotiations and that he should address General Ivanov. In the meantime Timok Division captured antipersonnel line and Danube Division captured point Papas-tepe. General Stepanović moved behind front lines of Danube regiments, and at 11 am was on Bekčitepe, near Marash, which was captured by 4th Serbian Regiment. At 11.30 am, Bulgarian officers came to Shukri Pasha's headquarters, and he surrendered to General Ivanov at 12.15 pm, but he returned to his headquarters an hour later on his personal wish. He was eventually captured by Serbian troops an hour later.

After Adrianople fell, Stepanović formed combined detachment on 27 March and marched solemnly into the conquered city. Few days later, he ordered that on Chernomen, exactly on the place where according to history the Battle of Maritsa took place, a memorial should be held to the fallen heroes. According to the participants, it was striking and touching moment. Soon after, Stepanović started preparations to transport his army back to Serbia. Bulgarian government didn't give him enough trains to transport his troops back, so he threatened that he will take his army back to Serbia on foot. After this, Bulgarians relented and he transferred whole army from 1 April to 9 May.

== First World War ==
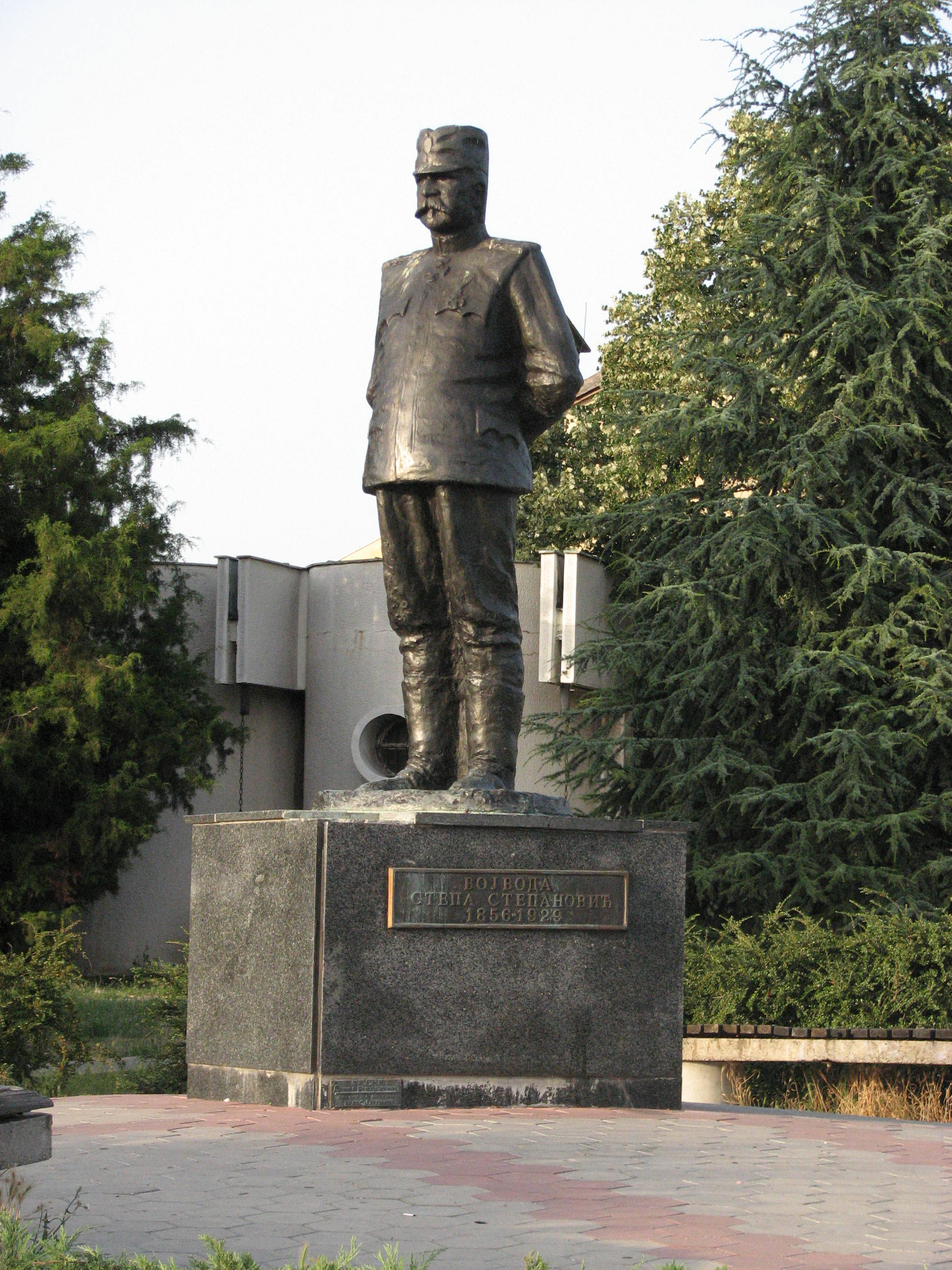
Monument in Kumodraž

At the beginning of World War I he acted as the representative of the absent chief of staff Radomir Putnik. He was responsible for mobilization and some war preparations. After Putnik's return he took command of the Second Army. In World War I, he led the Serbian army in a great victory in the Battle of Cer, where his Second Army completely defeated the Austrian Fifth Army, arriving to the scene after a forced march. This was the first allied victory of the war, and he was promoted to Field Marshal. His army achieved successes in the Battle of the Drina and Battle of Kolubara, in addition to the defence of Serbia in 1915.

In 1918 he was again in command of the Second Army which was a part of the large Allied offensive in Macedonia, they achieved a breakthrough on 15 September. The Second Army advanced to the Bulgarian border and from there, after Bulgarian capitulation on 29 September 1918 turned West towards Bosnia and the Adriatic Sea.

He was an active officer until the end of 1919, when he retired from service as the commander in chief of the Serbian army. During his career he was also serving as the minister of the army on two occasions.

He was decorated with the "Takovski krst sa ukrštenim mačevima" medal for bravery during the 1876-1878 wars against the Turks. He was also awarded the Knight Grand Cross (GCMG) of The Most Distinguished Order of Saint Michael and Saint George. He died in the town of Čačak in the morning of 27 April 1929.

== Legacy ==
He is included in The 100 most prominent Serbs. His birth house in Kumodraž (Belgrade) is converted into a small museum dedicated to his life and legacy. Reconstruction and conservation of the house was done in 2014 when house was finally reopened to visitors.

== See also ==
- Petar Bojović
- Radomir Putnik
- Živojin Mišić
- Božidar Janković
- Ilija Gojković
- Pavle Jurišić Šturm
- Ivan S. Pavlović

== Notes ==
1. Birth date: Stepanović's birthdate is often misinterpreted as 12 March 1856. Yet, since he was born 28 February 1856 (Old Style), and the difference between the calendars was twelve days at the time, 1856 being a leap year, it can be calculated that Stepanović was actually born 11 March 1856 (New Style).

== Decorations ==
Serbian military decorations
| Order of the Karađorđe's Star with Swords, Knight Grand Cross |
| Order of the Karađorđe's Star with Swords, Grand Officer |
| Order of the Karađorđe's Star with Swords, Commander |
| Order of the Karađorđe's Star with Swords, Officer |
| Order of the Karađorđe's Star, Commander |
| Order of the Karađorđe's Star, Officer |
| Order of the White Eagle with Swords, Commander |
| Order of the White Eagle, Commander |
| Order of the White Eagle, Officer |
| Order of the Cross of Takovo, Grand Officer |
| Order of the Cross of Takovo, Commander |
| Order of the Cross of Takovo, Officer |
| Order of the Cross of Takovo with swords, Cavalier; |
Serbian Service Medals
| Medal for Bravery, Gold |
| Medal for Bravery, Silver |
| Commemorative medal of the King Petar I |
| Commemorative medal of the wars with Turkey 1876-1878 |
| Commemorative medal of the war with Bulgaria 1885 |
| Medal for Military Merit |
| Commemorative Medal of the First Balkan War |
| Commemorative Medal of the Second Balkan War |
| Commemorative Medal of the First World War |
| Albanian Commemorative Medal |
International and Foreign Awards
| Legion of Honour, Officer (France) |
| Order of the Redeemer, Knight Grand Cross (Greece) |
| Order of the Crown of Italy, Knight Grand Cross (Italy) |
| Order of Prince Danilo I, Knight Grand Cross (Montenegro) |
| Order of Saint Stanislaus, Knight Grand Cross (Russian Empire) |
| Order of Saint Stanislaus with Swords, Commander (Russian Empire) |
| Order of St. George, IV class (Russian Empire) |
| Order of the Bath, Knight Commander (United Kingdom) |
| Order of the Bath, Companion (United Kingdom) |
| Medal of Obilić (Kingdom of Montenegro) |
| Distinguished Service Order (United Kingdom) |

== Notes ==
Political offices
| Preceded by Radomir Putnik | Serbian Minister of Army; 1908 | Succeeded by Mihailo Živković |
| Preceded by Ilija Gojković | Serbian Minister of Army; 1908–1912 | Succeeded by Radomir Putnik |
