= Vrapče (disambiguation) =

Vrapče is a neighborhood in Zagreb, the capital of Croatia.

Vrapče may also refer to:

- Vrapče (Tutin), village in the municipality of Tutin, Serbia
- Vrapče (Vogošća), village in Vogošća municipality, near Sarajevo, Federation of Bosnia and Herzegovina
