= Mihailo Živković =

Serbian army general (1856–1930)

Mihailo Živković Михаило Живковић
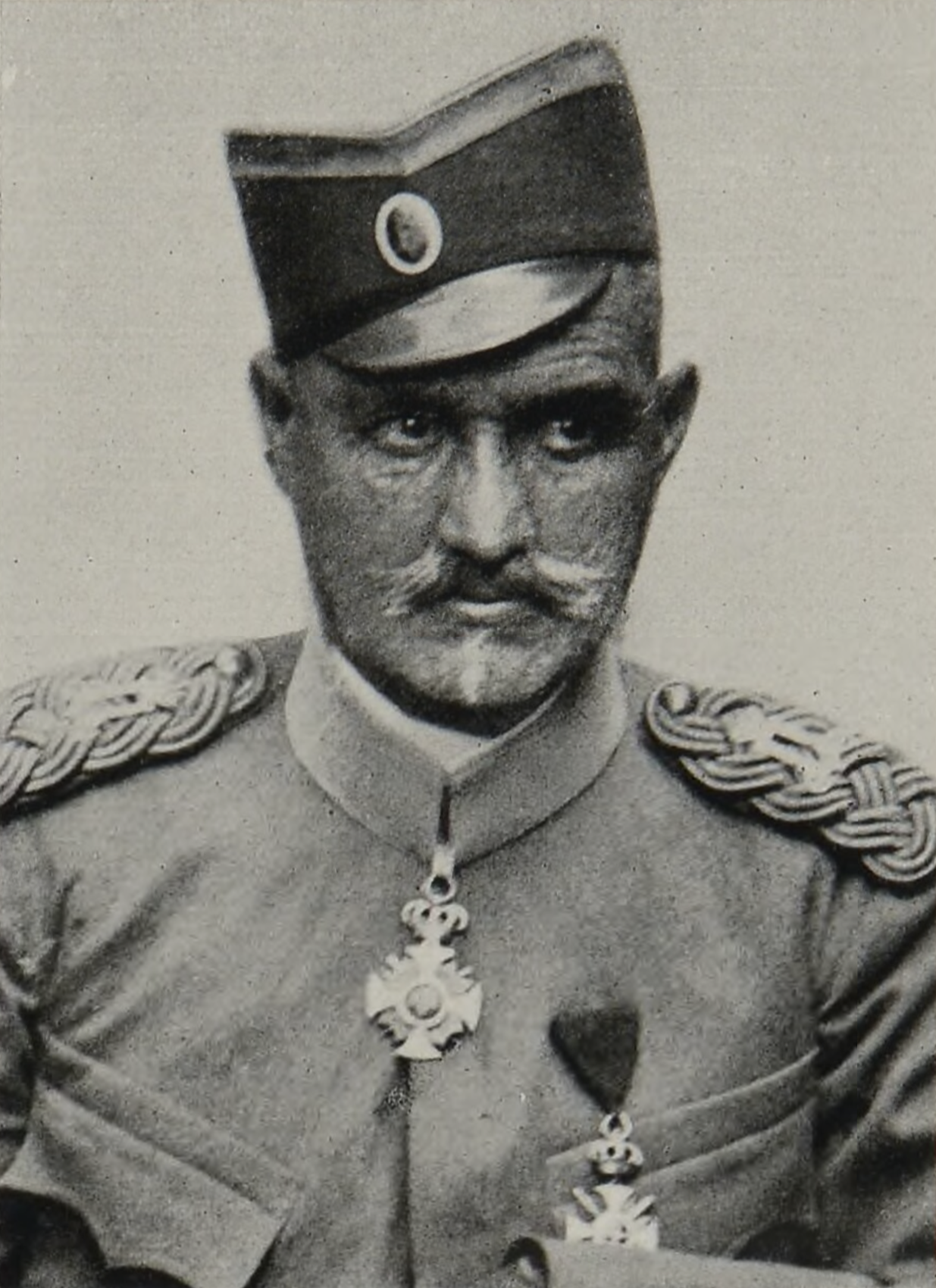
- Mihailo Živković (c. 1918

35th Minister of the Army of the Kingdom of Serbia
- In office 23 December 1908 – 1 October 1909
- Monarch: Peter I
- Prime Minister: Petar Velimirović; Stojan Novaković
- Preceded by: Stepa Stepanović
- Succeeded by: Milutin Marinović

Personal details
- Born: 29 August 1856 Belgrade, Serbia
- Died: 28 April 1930 (aged 73) Belgrade, Kingdom of Yugoslavia

Military service
- Allegiance: Principality of Serbia; Kingdom of Serbia
- Rank: General
- Battles/wars: Serbian–Ottoman Wars (1876–1878); Serbo-Bulgarian War; First Balkan War; World War I

Mihailo Zivković-Gvozdeni (Belgrade, Principality of Serbia 29 August 1856 – Belgrade, Kingdom of Yugoslavia, 28 April 1930) was a Serbian general and a minister of war.

Zivković-Gvozdeni commanded forces in the Serbian-Turkish wars, the Serbo-Bulgarian War of 1885, the Balkan Wars and World War I and received many decorations for his military service.

== Early life and family ==
Zivković-Gvozdeni was born on 29 August 1856 in Belgrade. His father Jovan was a merchant and his mother was named Stanka. He was a descendant of Milenko Stojković and Hajduk Veljko Petrović through his father's and mother's line. He finished elementary school and Gymnasium in Belgrade. Zivković was married to Darinka, the daughter of Ranko Godjevac, a merchant from Valjevo. They had three sons Miodrag, Jovan and Milan.

== Serbian-Turkish wars ==
On 20 September 1874, Zivković-Gvozdeni joined the Serbian army. He was assigned as a cadet to the 11th class of the Artillery School. He was promoted to cadet corporal on 6 September 1875, cadet Sub-Sergeant on 4 May 1876 and cadet Sergeant on 1 July 1876. After finishing his second year of Artillery School, Zivković-Gvozdeni was sent to fight Ottoman forces as a cadet sergeant. He was assigned to General František Zach, commander of the Javor Army, as an orderly. After being promoted to infantry [lieutenant], He was appointed commander of the Rača battalion of the Užice brigade of the 2nd class. As the commander of the predecessor of the Čačak Brigade, he crossed the Prepolac ridge and came to Priština. Zivković-Gvozdeni then served as commander of the Dragačevo battalion of the Čačak brigade, participating in the liberation of Prokuplje and Kursumlija from Turkish forces.

== Peacetime 1878 to 1885 ==
After an armistice was signed with the Ottoman Empire, Zivković-Gvozdeni served as adjutant of the 1st class Čačak Brigade. On 3 April 1878, he was appointed sergeant in the 7th Battalion of the Standing Army. In November 1879. Zivković-Gvozdeni returned to artillery school. He graduated at the end of 1880.

After graduation, Zivković-Gvozdeni was appointed sergeant in the 6th Battalion of the Standing Army. On 20 October 1882 he was promoted to infantry lieutenant and on 12 October 1883 was made company commander in the 8th Battalion of the Permanent Staff. On 27 March 1885, on the same duty in the 7th Battalion, and from 13 September isin the same position in the 2nd Battalion of the 10th Infantry Regiment.

== Serbo-Bulgarian war and armistice ==
With the outbreak of war with Bulgaria in 1885, Zivković first commanded a company in the 2nd Battalion of the 11th Infantry Regiment. He later became the commander of the 2nd Battalion, which captured three Bulgarian army positions near Aldomirovtsi. With an armistice signed with Bulgaria, Zivković-Gvozdeni was appointed in March 1886 as a company commander in the 11th Guards Battalion, and from April from December 1887 Adjutant Chief of the General Staff.

In December 1887, Zivković was sent to military college in Russia. While there, he practiced with the 145th Imperial Regiment of the Russian Imperial Army in St. Petersburg. In October 1889, Zivković was appointed acting commander of the 3rd Guards Battalion. At the same time, he taught shooting and rifle fighting at the Great School. In October 1890. he became the commander of the Pitomačka company Military Academy. He remained in that position until 12 June 1891, when he was assigned to serve in the General Staff Department of the General Military Department of the Ministry of War.

From October 1891 to August 1893. Zivković was made acting, and then commander of the 6th Infantry Battalion. Then, until June 1894, Zivković-Gvozdeni served as commander of the 3rd Guards Regiment. He was appointed acting Chief of Staff of the Command of the Šumadija Divisional Area on 1 June 1894, and on 9 September of the same year, Chief of Staff of the Infantry Inspection.

On 10 December 1894, Zivković-Gvozdeni was transferred, for the second time, to the General Staff Department of the General Military Department of the Ministry of War. He was the commander of the infantry non-commissioned officer school from 22 March 1895, to 18 March 1897. From then until December 1897, he was the commander of the 14th infantry regiment and the commander of the place in Knjaževac. On December 25, 1897, Zivković was appointed infantry officer of the Corps Department in the Active Army Command.

On 23 March 1900, Zivković-Gvozdeni became the acting commander of Timočka, and then from 30 October 1901, the commander of the Drina Infantry Brigade. From 19 April 1902 to 11 October 1902, he was the commander of Nis, and then he became the commander of the Timok divisional area. In addition to command duties, from May to October 1902, Zivković-Gvozdeni taught tactics at the Military Academy. From July 1903, Zivković-Gvozdeni was also appointed a member of the Higher Military Council. At the end of March 1908, he was appointed director of the Military Academy, and the following month he was appointed infantry inspector.

== Minister of War ==
With the reconstruction of Petar Velimirović's cabinet, on December 23, 1908, Zivković-Gvozdeni was appointed Minister of War, replacing General Stepa Stepanović. In the new cabinet of Stojan Novaković, from 11 February 1909, he kept this department.

On 1 October 1909, Zivković-Gvozdeni was replaced as Minister of War by Ljubomir Stojanović. As early as 9 October 1909, he again held the position of manager of the Military Academy, where he remained until 1912. In addition to administrative work, 1910–1911, Zivković-Gvozdeni also served as president of the Military Disciplinary Court.

== Balkan Wars and First World War ==
After Serbia declared war on the Ottoman Empire in September 1912, Zivković returned to military command. He was appointed commander of the Ibar Operational Army. With this unit, he acted in the direction of Novi Pazar and Raška. In 1913, he was the commander of the troops on the Albanian front. The German war correspondent Hermenegild Wagner, reporting in November 1912, claimed that Živković was responsible for having massacred 950 Albanian and Turkish notables.

In the First World War, in 1914, he was the commander of the Belgrade Defense. He was at the head of this military formation in 1915. With the fall of Serbia to German, Austro-Hungarian and Bulgarian forces, Zivković-Gvozdeni accompanied the remainder of the Serbian army to Corfu, where this command was disbanded in 1916.

In June 1916, Zivković-Gvozdeni was appointed commander of the Serbian Volunteer Army in Russia. This force was composed of Austro-Hungarian prisoners of warforce. Under the command of the Russian imperial Army, this force included Serbs, Rusyns, Slovak, Czech and other ethnic groups. Since the 1st Division had already been formed before Zivković-Gvozdeni arrived in Odesa, he took over the formation of the 2nd Division.

== Retirement ==
With the onset of the Russian Revolution in 1917, Zivković-Gvozdeni decided to join a corps of Serbian volunteers being sent to the Thessaloniki front, However, after falling ill along the way, he stayed in Paris. A medical examination established that he was incapable of further active military service. Zivković-Gvozdeni retired on 1 June 1918.

With the formation of the State of Slovenes, Croats and Serbs at the end of World War I, Zivković-Gvozdeni chose to not continue his military service as a reserve officer.

== Death ==
Zivković-Gvozdeni died on 28 April 1930.

== Decorations and awards ==
- Order of Karađorđe's Star with swords of the 3rd and 4th degree
- Royal Order of Karađorđe's Star of the 3rd degree
- Royal Order of the White Eagle 3rd-, 4th- and 5th-class
- Order of the Cross of Takovo with swords of the 5th degree
- Order of the Cross of Takovo Cross of the 2nd and 3rd degree
- Order of Saint Sava 2nd degree
- Medal for military virtues
- Commemorative medals of the wars: 1876–1878, 1885, 1912-1913 and 1914–1918.
- Commemorative Medal of the Great Serbian Retreat

== Sources ==
- Milićević, Milić; Popović, Ljubodrag (1998). Ministri vojni Kneževine i Kraljevine Srbije: 1862—1918. Beograd: Vojnoizdavački zavod. ISBN 86-335-0035-3.
- Milićević, Milić; Popović, Ljubodrag (2003). Generali Vojska Kneževine i Kraljevine Srbije. Beograd: Vojnoizdavački zavod. ISBN 86-335-0142-2.
- Opačić, Petar (2008). Duke Živojin Mišić (Second ed.). BeoSing. ISBN 978-86-87187-00-9.
