= Pirot Fortress =

Fortress in Pirot, Serbia

Coordinates: 43°09′33″N 22°34′54″E

Pirot Fortress Momchilov Grad
- Pirot; Serbia
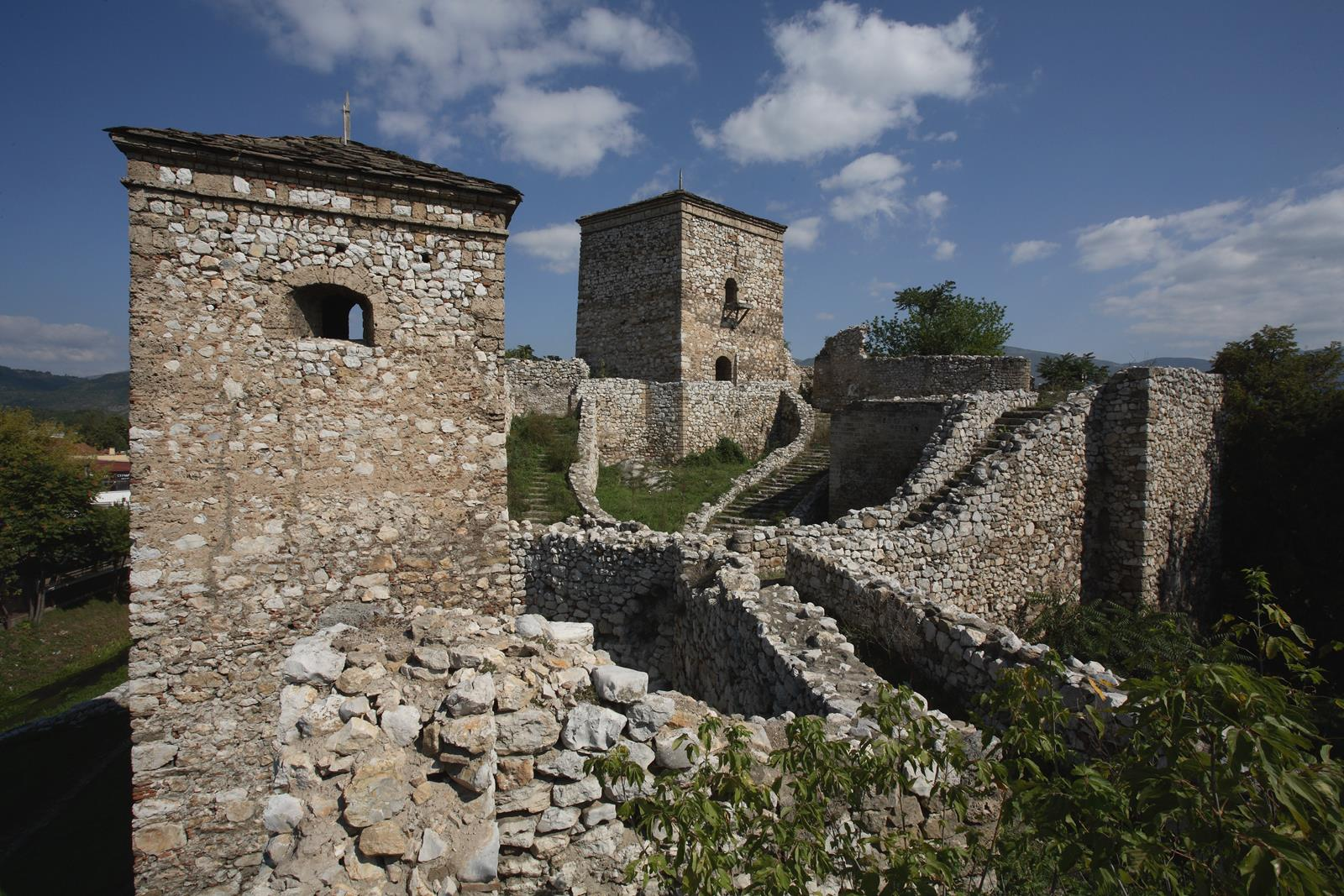
- Pirot Fortress

Site information
- Type: Fortification
- Open to the public: Yes

Site history
- Built: 14th century
- Materials: Stone

Garrison information
- Designations: Cultural Heritage of Serbia

Pirot Fortress is situated in Pirot, Serbia. It was supposed to serve as a defense along the ancient Roman road called Via Militaris (Military Road) which connected Belgrade to Constantinople.

Pirot Fortress was declared Monument of Culture of Great Importance in 1979, and it is protected by Republic of Serbia.

== History ==
Through different periods of time Pirot Fortress bore different names: Turres (Tower), in the 3rd and 4th centuries during the Roman Empire, and then Pirgos, Thurib, Momčilov grad, Kale, Tvrđava. Archaeological research revealed that Pirot Fortress has Roman origins, serving a stronghold in the 3rd and 4th centuries to guard the strategic Via Militaris road, evolving over centuries with Byzantine and Bulgarian additions. Much of the visible today medieval structure was built later by Serbian rulers like Prince Lazar and Despot Stefan Lazarević.

Pirot fortress consists of three parts: Upper, Middle and Lower Town. Upper Town was built in the last decades of the 14th century, during the reign of Prince Lazar, and Middle Town during the reign of Despot Stefan Lazarević. Upper Town has an elongated polygonal shape in the west-east direction, measuring 50x35m. Middle Town has an ellipsoidal shape, measuring 70x60 m, and descends alongside Upper Town, but without any structural connection to it. Lower Town, measuring 180x130m, was built on a plain in the late 18th century, as an irregular rectangle in the southwest-northeast direction.

== Gallery ==
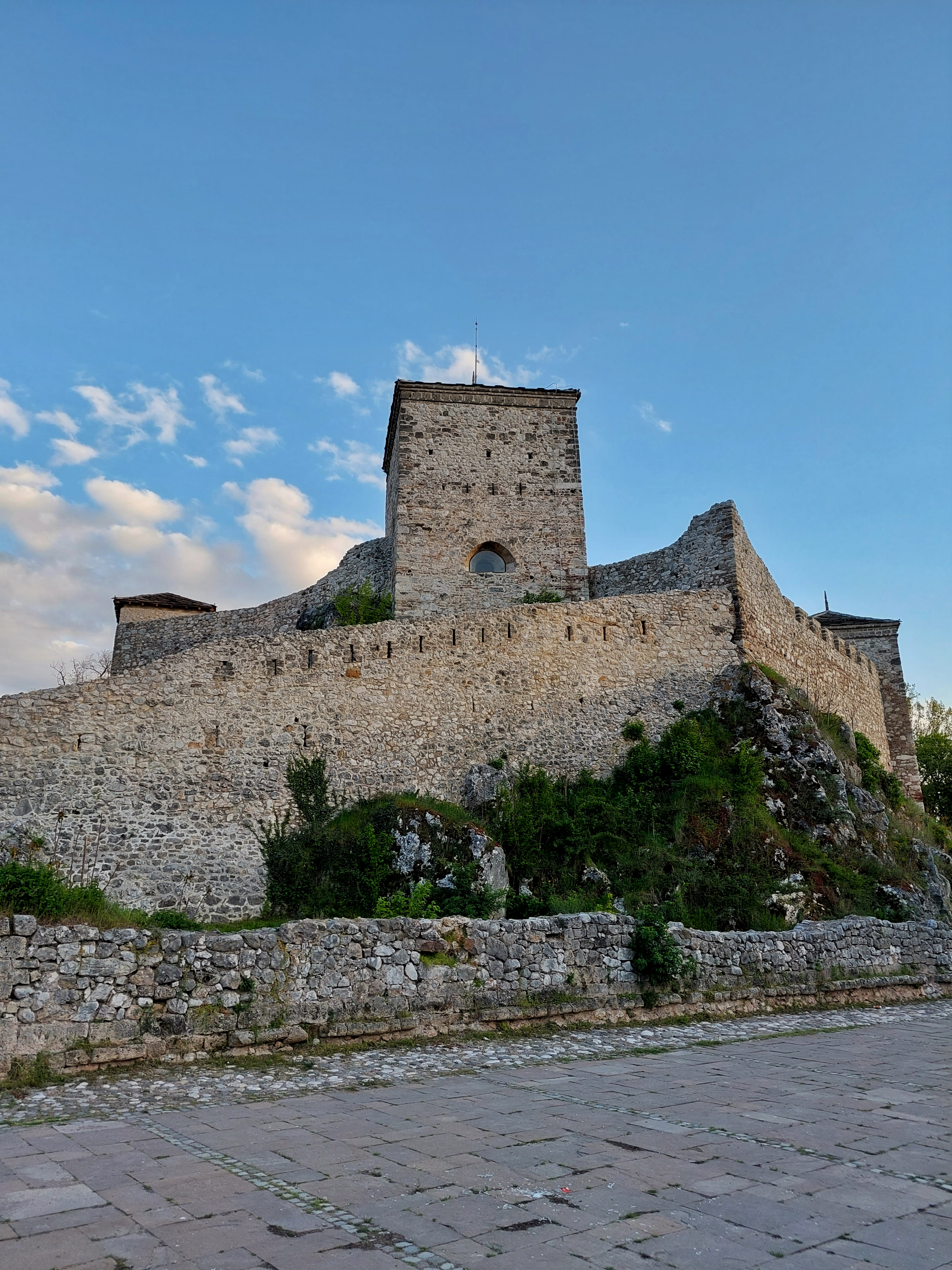

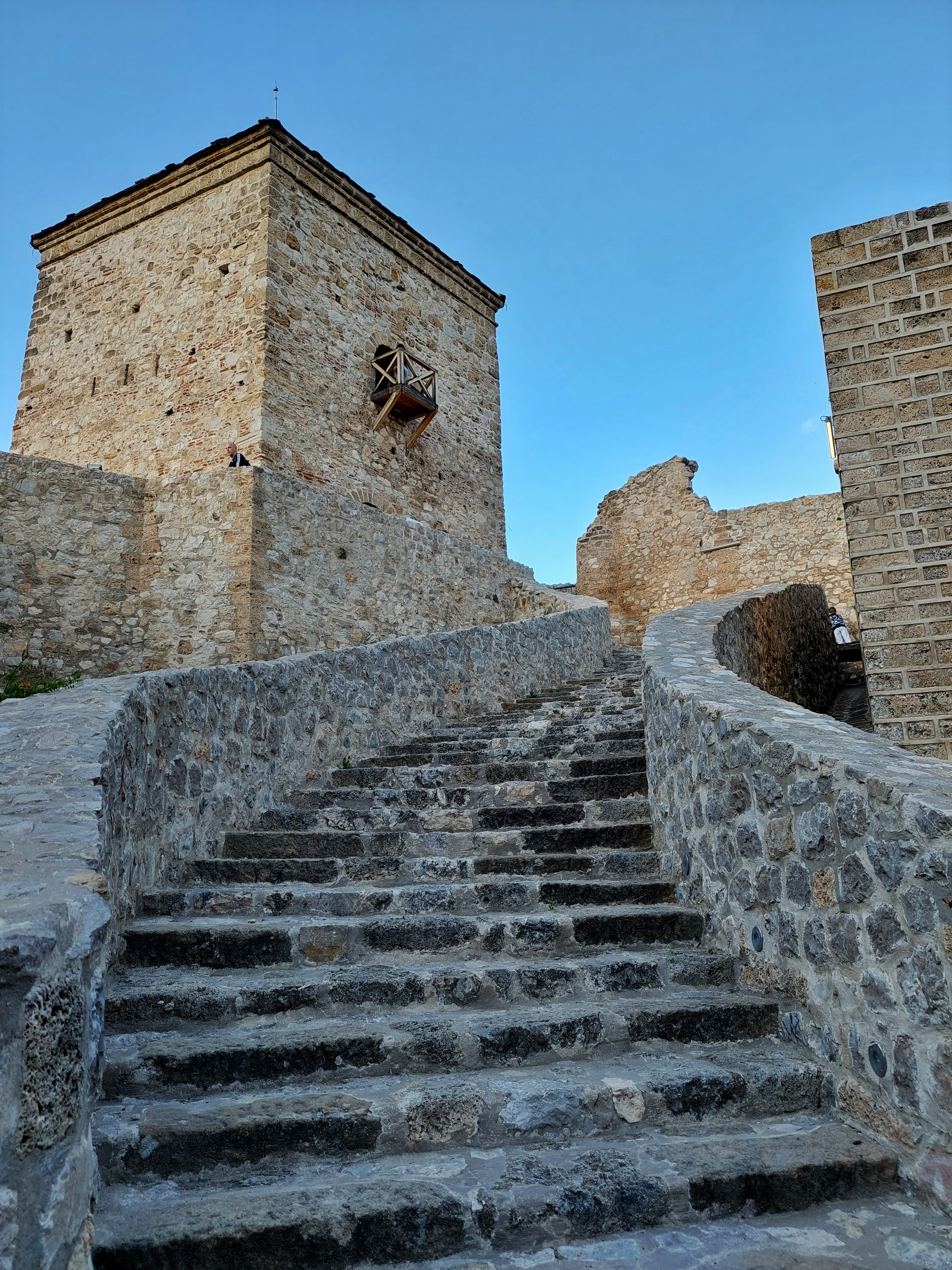

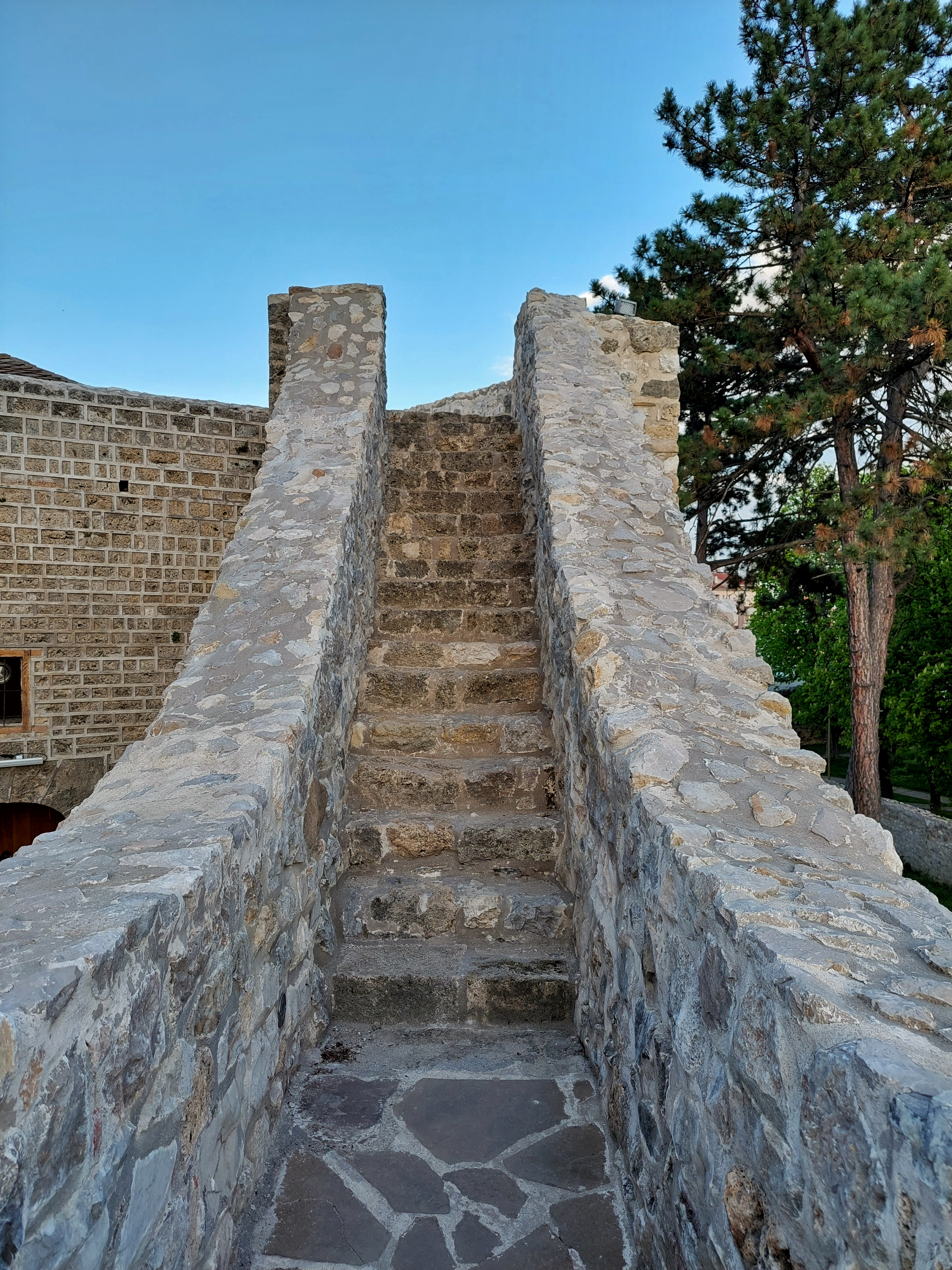

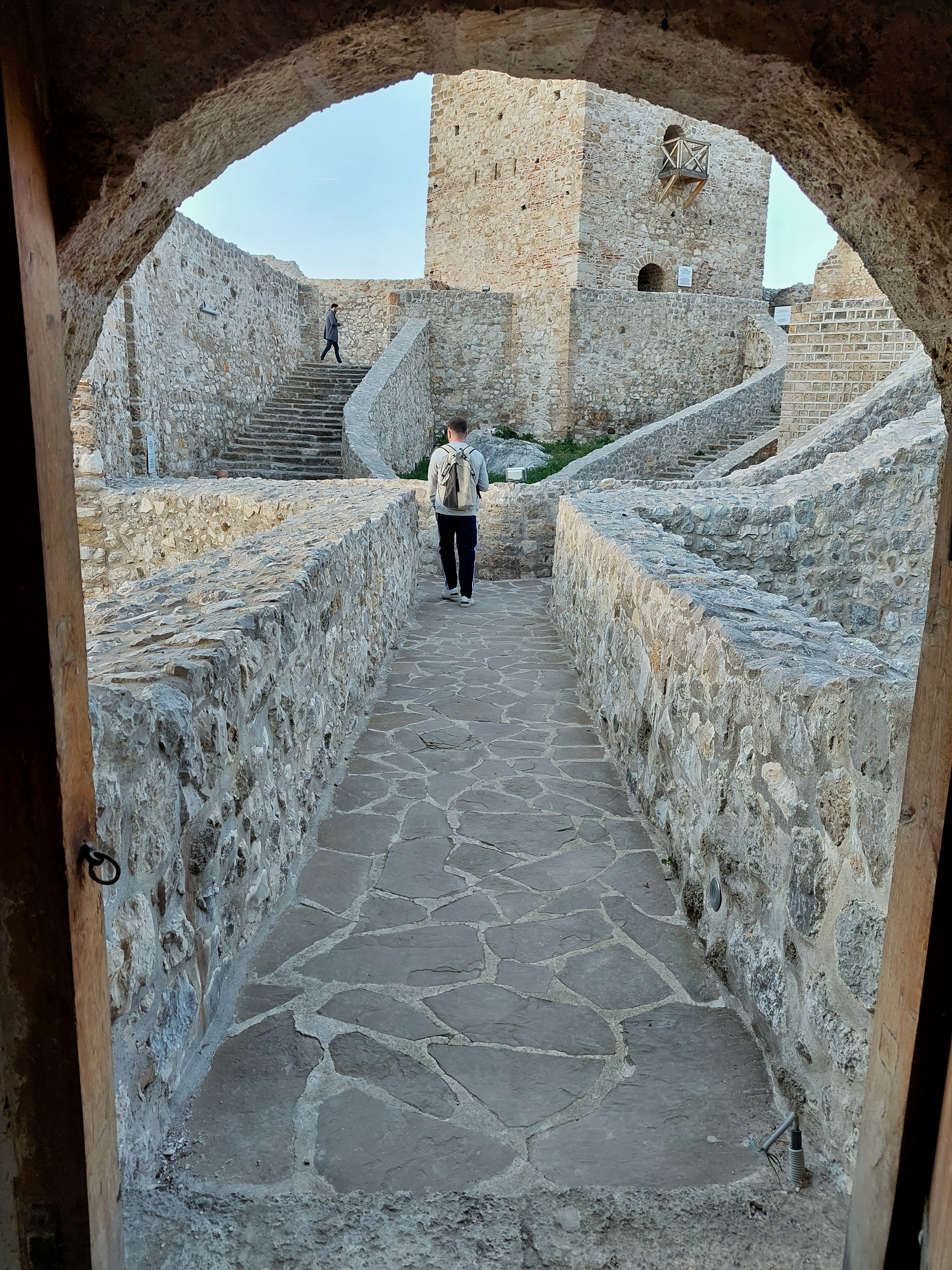

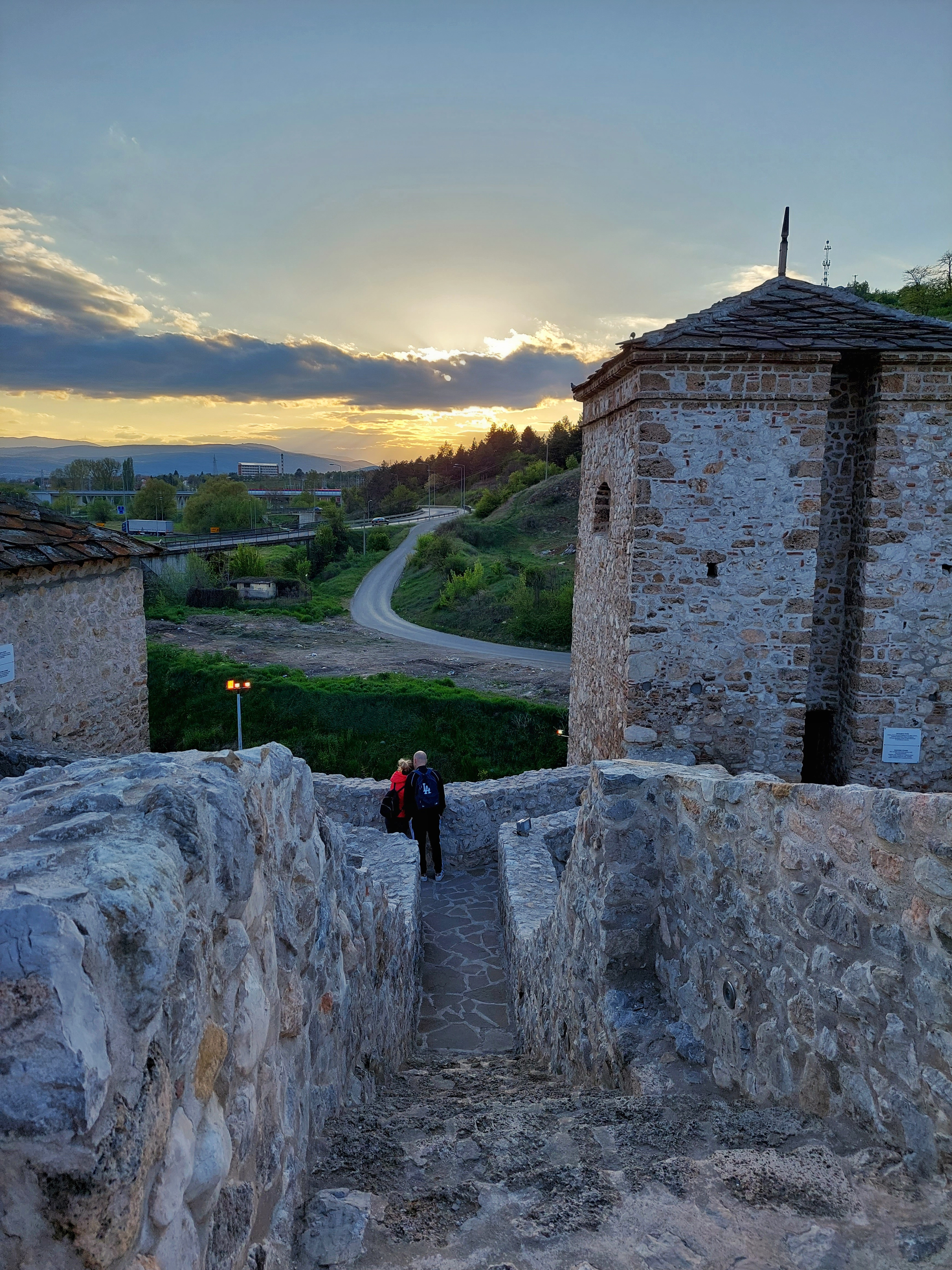

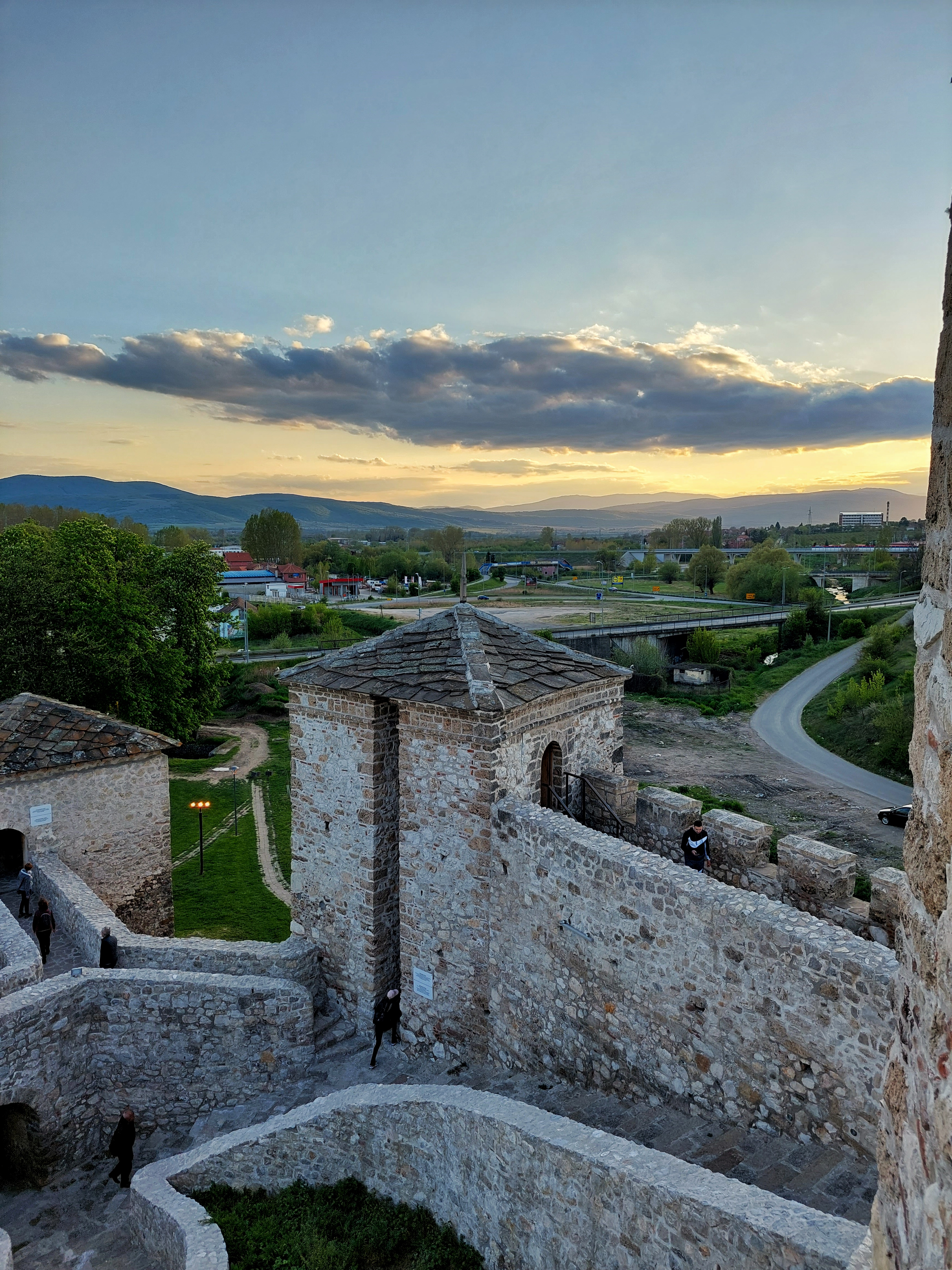

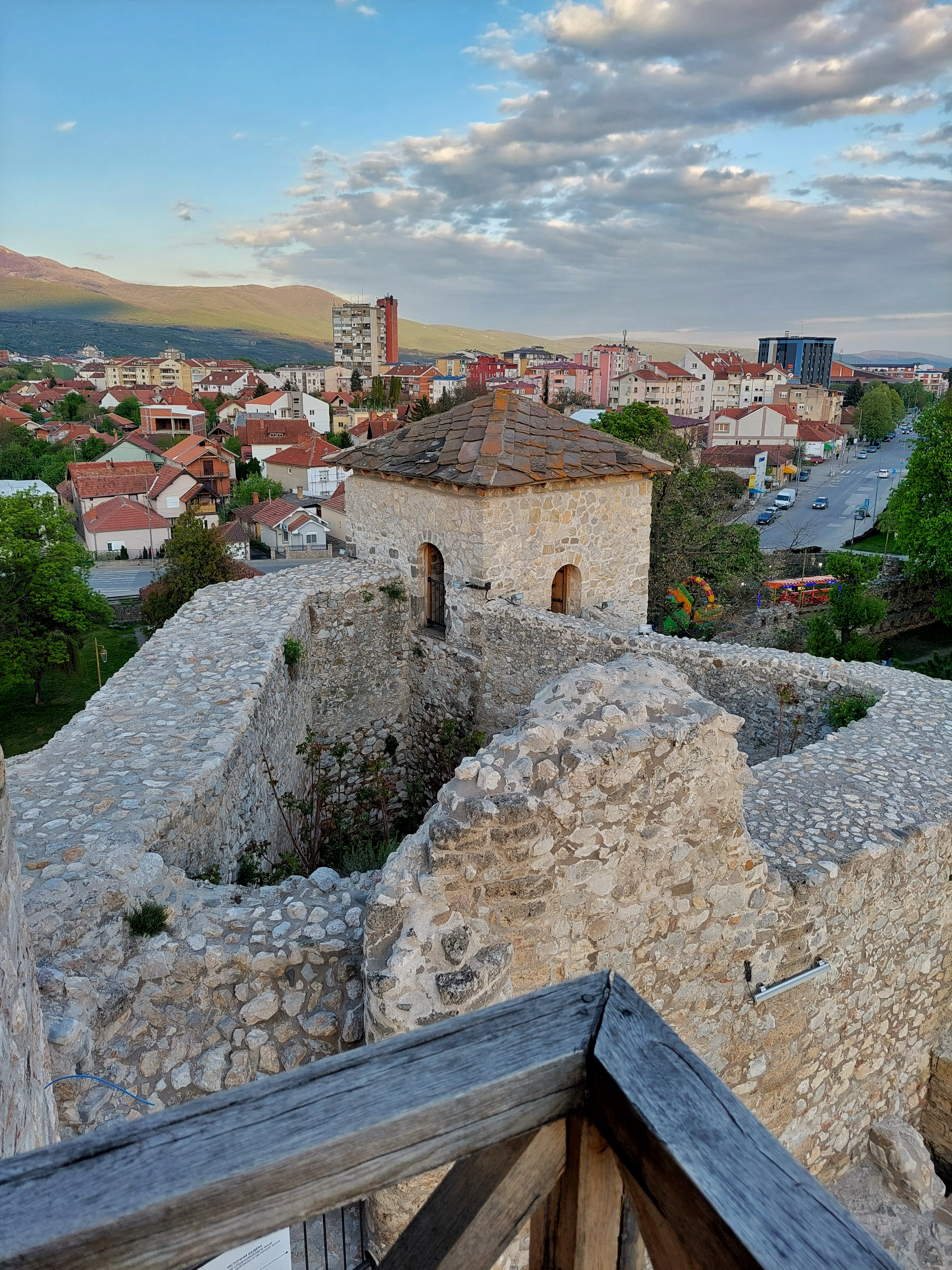

== See also ==
- Monuments of Culture of Great Importance
- Tourism in Serbia
