= Milutin Marinović =

Yugoslavia army general

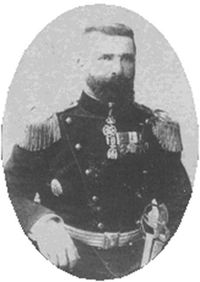

Milutin Marinović (Veliko Gradište, Austrian Empire, 29 August 1861 - Belgrade, Serbia, Kingdom of Yugoslavia, 1941) was a Serbian and Yugoslav army general.

== Early life and education ==
Marinović finished elementary school and seven grades of Gymnasium in Belgrade. He joined the army as a cadet of the 13th class of the Military Academy on 1 October 1880. He graduated on 2 August 1883 and was promoted to the rank of infantry lieutenant. As early as October 1884, he enrolled at the Higher School of the Military Academy. His schooling was interrupted by the Serbo-Bulgarian War, though he completed his courses successfully in 1887. In the same year, as a state cadet, he was sent to Imperial Russia for a one-year training, where he served in the units of the Petrograd garrison and attended classes at the officer's school in Oranienbaum, west of St. Petersburg.

After graduating from the Military Academy, he was first appointed a sergeant in the Danube Infantry Regiment. He was on this duty for a short time, because he started attending the Higher School of the Military Academy in October 1884.

== Military and political career ==
Due to the war with Bulgaria, he dropped out of school, and in September 1885 he was appointed acting company commander in the 4th Infantry Regiment. He participated in war operations with that unit. During 1886 and 1887, he continued his interrupted schooling. After finishing school, in June 1887, he was returned as a sergeant in the Danube Infantry Regiment. After returning from school in Russia, in October 1888, he was appointed a sergeant in the cadet company of the Military Academy. In January of the following year, he became a professor at the Military Academy for the subjects of service rules and infantry execution rules.

From 24 October 1891 to 1 June 1894, he was in preparation for a General Staff officer, from 1891 to the end of 1893 he was in the General Staff, and in 1894 in the General Staff Department of the General Military Department of the Ministry of War. He returned to the troupe from 1 June 1894, first as acting and then commander of the 3rd Guards Battalion. He was in that position until 17 October 1897, from when he headed the Infantry Non-Commissioned Officer School until 1 February 1898.

He was appointed acting commander of the 14th Infantry Regiment on 1 February 1898, and on 21 March he was appointed acting chief of staff of the Danube Divisional Area Command. In the 2nd Infantry Regiment, first, from 20 June 1899, he was acting commander, and from 9 March 1900, he was the commander. After being transferred to the General Staff profession, in August 1900 he was appointed Chief of the Internal Department of the Operational Department of the General Staff. He was in that position until 19 April 1902, and during that time he was also the editor of the magazine "Ratnik". He was then appointed acting commander of the Timok Infantry Brigade.

He was a military envoy in Petrograd from 10 January to 29 June 1903. Although he stayed in Russia for a short time, he managed to get 10,000 Berdan rifles with 300 bullets each as a gift from the Russian government and the tsar, with which the Serbian army managed to replenish the armament of his 2nd call. After returning from abroad, he became the acting commander of the Timok Infantry Brigade for the second time.

As early as October 1903, he was transferred to the position of Acting Chief of the Operational Department of the General Staff, and at the end of the same year, he became a member of the commission for the new Law on the Organization of the Army. He returned to the troupe in 1904 - from 30 April he was the commander of the 19th Infantry Regiment, and from 31 March 1905, he was in the same position in the 1st Infantry Regiment. He was an infantry inspector for the first time from September 1906 to March 1908. From then until March 1909, he was the commander of the Šumadija divisional area, and in October 1909 he was re-appointed as an infantry inspector. From this position, on 11 October 1909, he was appointed Minister of War in the cabinet of Nikola Pašić. As Minister of War, he carried out all the loans voted by the National Assembly for armaments and army readiness, armed the infantry with machine guns, and opened the Infantry Shooting School.

He resigned as a minister on 4 March 1910. He was appointed commander of the Danube Divisional Area on May 30, 1910, and infantry inspector, for the third time, on 6 March 1911. He held that position until 5 September 1912, when appointed commander of the Timok divisional area. He performed this duty for only ten days. After the outbreak of the war in 1912, he was with the Supreme Command, and then, on 12 October 1912, he was appointed commander of the place in Skopje.

In the war of 1913, from February, he was the commander of the 2nd Sumadija Division. He was again an infantry inspector from August 1913 to June 1914. All those years, except when he was a minister, he was also a judge of the Military Disciplinary Court. In the middle of June 1914, due to poor health, he went abroad for treatment. The war between Serbia and Austria-Hungary found him in the Austrian spa Carlsbad. On his return to Serbia, he was arrested in Vienna and interned. He was interned until the end of 1918. He was appointed head of the Military Mission in Vienna in 1919. He was in that position until the middle of 1920 when he was dismissed, made available, and retired in 1921.

Marinović also wrote his experiences on the battlefield for the military publication Ratnik.

== Death ==
He died in 1941 in Belgrade and was buried in the New Cemetery. He was 80.

== Promotions ==
He was promotion to rank:

- Corporal, 1 May 1881;
- Sub-Sergeant, 1 September 1881;
- Sergeant, 1 September 1882;
- Junior Lieutenant, 2 August 1883;
- Lieutenant, 22 February 1887;
- Captain 2nd Class, 22 January 1891;
- Captain 1st Class, 26 September 1893;
- Major, 22 February 1896;
- Lieutenant Colonel, 22 February 1900;
- Colonel, 6 March 1905;
- General, 1 November 1913.

== Decorations and awards ==
- Order of Karađorđe's Star with swords of the 4th order,
- Order of Karađorđe's Star of the 4th order,
- Order of the White Eagle of the 4th and 5th order,
- Order of the Cross of Takovo of the 3rd and 4th order,
- Gold Medal for Bravery
- Monument of King Peter 1.
- Monuments of the wars of 1885 and 1912–1913.

Foreign decorations:

- Order of St. Stanislaus with a ribbon of the 1st order (Russian)
- Legion of Honour the 4th order, (French)
- Order of the Officer's Cross with a star (Spanish)
- Cross of Military Merit, Officer's Cross with a star (Spanish)
