= First Balkan War order of battle: Bulgarian Army =

== First phase (1912) ==
The following is the Bulgarian order of battle at the beginning of the First Balkan War as of October 8, 1912. After its mobilization the field army counted for 366,209 men and represented half the field forces of the Balkan League. Its greater part was deployed in the main theater of the war in Thrace but the army also contributed to the allied war effort in Macedonia. This order of battle includes all combat units, including engineer and artillery units, but not medical, supply, signal and border guard units.

=== GHQ ===
The nominal commander in chief of the Bulgarian Army was Tsar Ferdinand I but de facto its control and leadership were in the hands of his deputy Lieutenant-General Mihail Savov. The Chief of the General Staff was Major-General Ivan Fichev with Colonel Stefan Nerezov as his Deputy Chief.

=== Thracian Theater ===
==== First Army ====
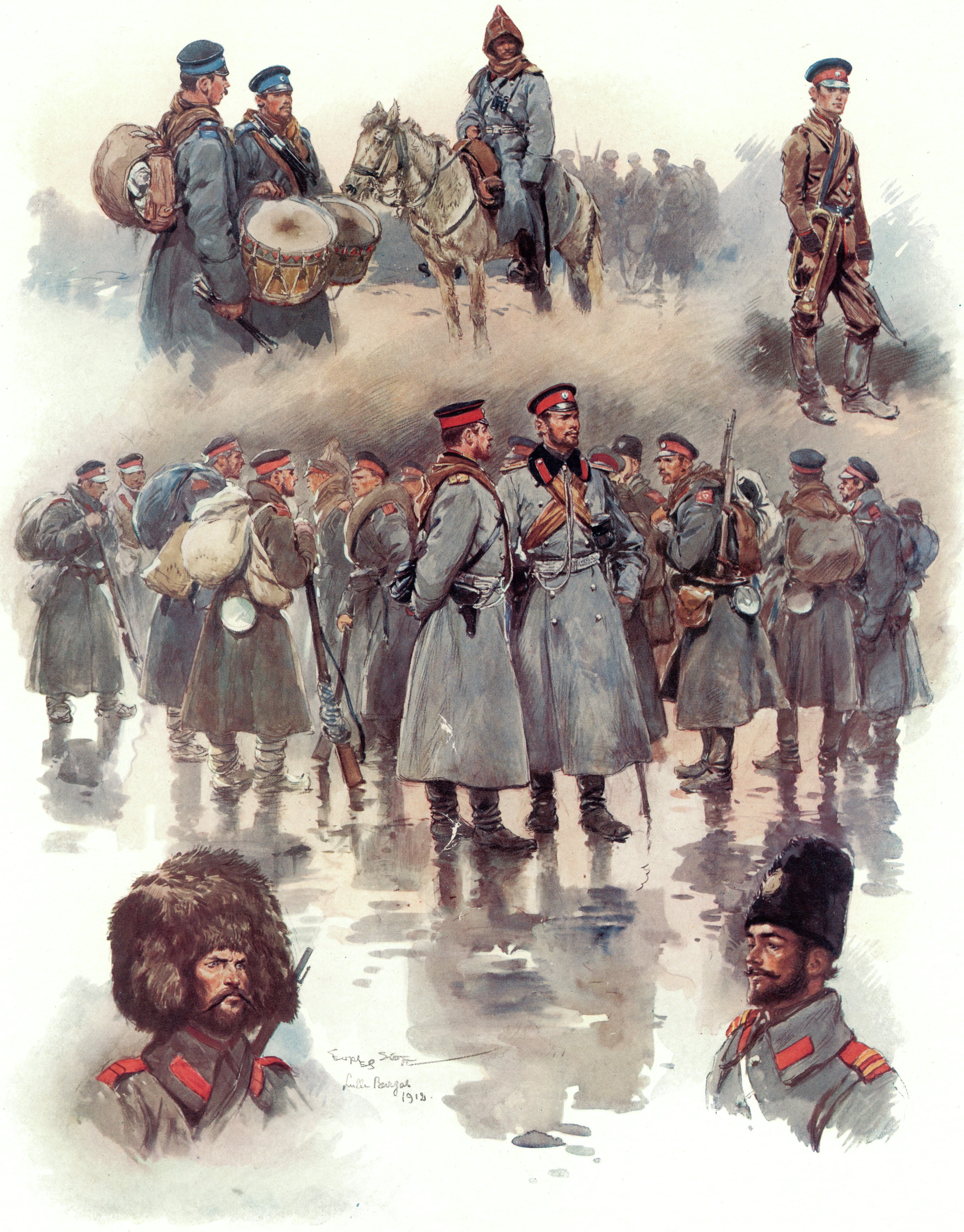
Types of Bulgarian soldiers during the Balkan Wars

First Army was commanded by lieutenant-general Vasil Kutinchev.

- 1st Sofia Infantry Division ( Major-General Toshev)
  - 1st Brigade (Colonel Zheliavski)
    - 1st "Sofia" Infantry Regiment
    - 6th "Turnovo" Infantry Regiment
  - 2nd Brigade (Major-General Popov)
    - 37th Infantry Regiment
    - 38th Infantry Regiment
  - 4th QF FAR (Note: Quick-firing field artillery regiment (QF FAR), mountain artillery regiment (MAR).)
  - 4th FAR
  - 1st Pioneer Battalion
- 3rd Balkan Infantry Division ( Major-General Sarafov)
  - 1st Brigade (Colonel Paskalev)
    - 11th "Sliven" Infantry Regiment
    - 24th "Black Sea" Infantry Regiment
  - 2nd Brigade (Colonel Ribarov)
    - 29th "Yambol" Infantry Regiment
    - 32nd "Zagora" Infantry Regiment
  - 3rd Brigade (Major-General Tepavicharov)
    - 41st Infantry Regiment
    - 42nd Infantry Regiment
  - 6th QF FAR
  - 6th FAR
  - 3rd Pioneer Battalion
- 10th Infantry Division ( Major-General Bradistilov)
  - 1st Brigade (Colonel Petev)
    - 16th "Lovech" Infantry Regiment
    - 25th "Dragoman" Infantry Regiment
  - 2nd Brigade (Colonel Atanas Petrov)
    - 47th Infantry Regiment
    - 48th Infantry Regiment
  - 10th FAR
  - 10th Pioneer Battalion

==== Second Army ====
Second Army was commanded by lieutenant-general Nikola Ivanov.

- 8th Tundzha Infantry Division ( Major-General Kirkov)
  - 1st Brigade (Colonel Marchin)
    - 10th "Rhodope" Infantry Regiment
    - 30th "Sheinovo" Infantry Regiment
  - 2nd Brigade (Colonel Kardzhiev)
    - 12th "Balkan" Infantry Regiment
    - 23rd "Shipka" Infantry Regiment
  - 3rd Brigade (Colonel Pachev)
    - 51st Infantry Regiment
    - 52nd Infantry Regiment
  - 8th QF FAR
  - 8th FAR
  - 8th Pioneer Battalion
- 9th Pleven Infantry Division ( Major-General Sirakov)
  - 1st Brigade (Colonel Evrov)
    - 4th "Pleven" Infantry Regiment
    - 17th "Dorostol" Infantry Regiment
  - 2nd Brigade (Colonel Popov)
    - 33rd "Svishtov" Infantry Regiment
    - 34th "Troyan" Infantry Regiment
  - 3rd Brigade (Colonel Grancharov)
    - 53rd Infantry Regiment
    - 54th Infantry Regiment
  - 9th QF FAR
  - 9th FAR
  - 9th Pioneer Battalion
- Haskovo Detachment ( Colonel Delov)
  - 2/2nd Brigade
    - 28th "Stremski" Infantry Regiment
    - 40th Infantry Regiment
  - 3rd FAR
- Mixed Cavalry Brigade (Colonel Tanev)
  - 3rd Cavalry Regiment
  - 6th Cavalry Regiment

==== Third Army ====
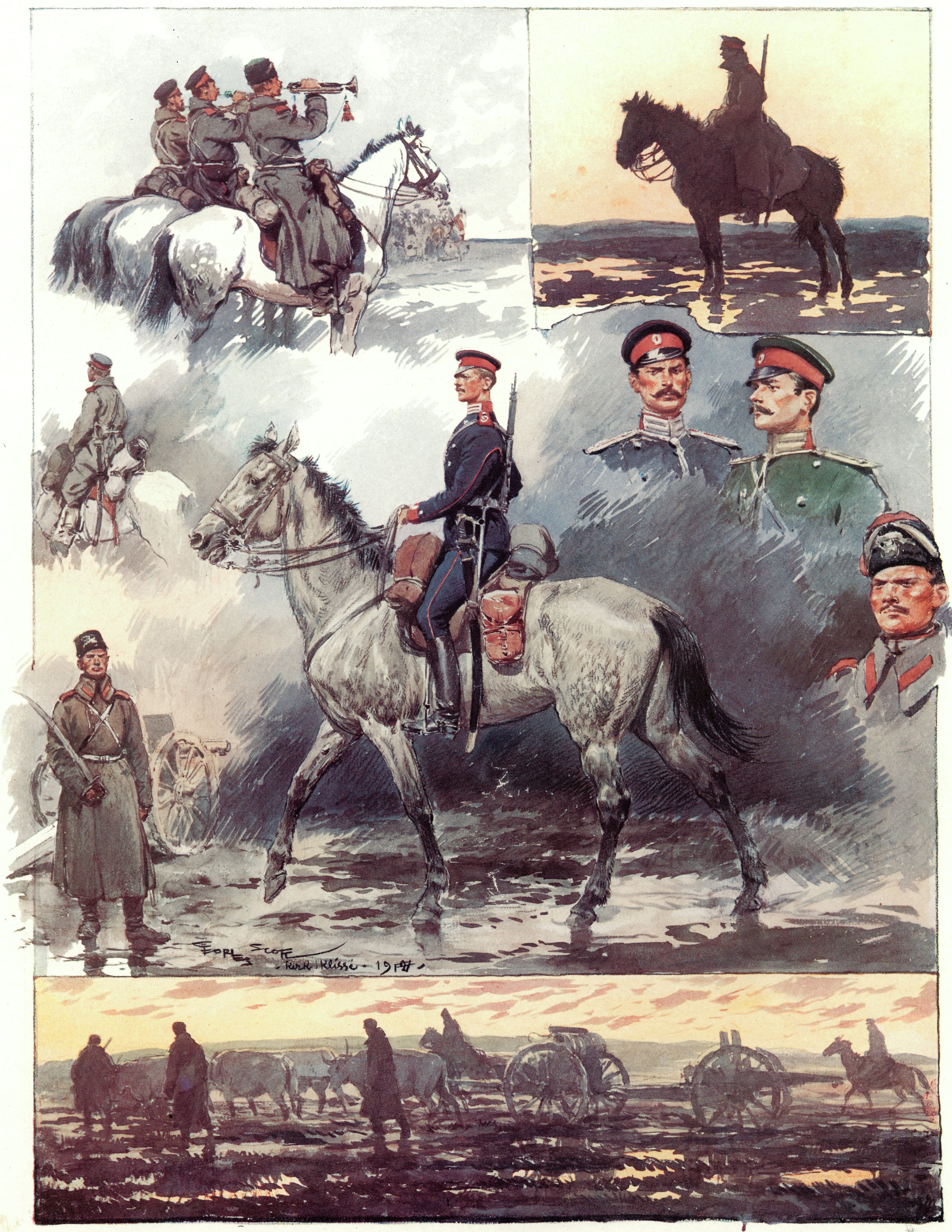
Types of Bulgarian cavalry during the Balkan Wars

Third Army was commanded by lieutenant-general Radko Dimitriev.

- 4th Preslav Infantry Division ( Major-General Boyadzhiev)
  - 1st Brigade (Colonel Todorov)
    - 7th "Preslav" Infantry Regiment
    - 19th "Shumen" Infantry Regiment
  - 2nd Brigade (Colonel Enchev)
    - 8th "Primorski" Infantry Regiment
    - 31st "Varna" Infantry Regiment
  - 3rd Brigade (Major-General Tserkovkski)
    - 43rd Infantry Regiment
    - 44th Infantry Regiment
  - 5th QF FAR
  - 5th FAR
  - 4th Pioneer Battalion
- 5th Danube Infantry Division ( Major-General Hristov)
  - 1st Brigade (Colonel Abadzhiev)
    - 2nd "Iskar" Infantry Regiment
    - 5th "Danube" Infantry Regiment
  - 2nd Brigade (Colonel Sofroniev)
    - 18th "Etarski" Infantry Regiment
    - 20th "Dobruja" Infantry Regiment
  - 3rd Brigade (Colonel Ivanov)
    - 45th Infantry Regiment
    - 46th Infantry Regiment
  - 1st QF FAR
  - 1st FAR
  - 5th Pioneers Battalion
- 6th Bdin Infantry Division ( Major-General Tenev)
  - 1st Brigade (Colonel Kantardzhiev)
    - 3rd "Bdin" Infantry Regiment
    - 15th "Lom" Infantry Regiment
  - 2nd Brigade (Colonel Pakov)
    - 35th "Vratsa" Infantry Regiment
    - 36th "Kozloduy" Infantry Regiment
  - 2nd FAR
  - 6th Pioneer Battalion

==== Cavalry ====
The single Bulgarian cavalry division served independently on the Thracian Theater:

- Cavalry Division ( Major-General Nazlamov)
  - 1st Brigade (Colonel Salabashev)
    - 1st Cavalry Regiment
    - 2nd Cavalry Regiment
  - 2nd Brigade (Colonel Danailov)
    - 4th Cavalry Regiment
    - 7th Cavalry Regiment
    - 10th Cavalry Regiment

=== Western Theater ===
==== Second Allied Army ====
Second Allied Army was commanded by General Stepa Stepanović.

- 7th Rila Infantry Division (Major-General Todorov)
  - 1st Brigade (Colonel Mitov)
    - 13th "Rila" Infantry Regiment
    - 28th "Pernik" Infantry Regiment
  - 2nd Brigade (Colonel Chilingirov)
    - 14th "Macedonian" Infantry Regiment
    - 22nd "Thracian" Infantry Regiment
  - 3rd Brigade (Colonel Georgiev)
    - 49th Infantry Regiment
    - 50th Infantry Regiment
  - 7th QF FAR
  - 7th FAR
  - 2nd MAR**
  - 5th Cavalry Regiment
  - 7th Pioneer Battalion

==== Rhodope Detachment ====
The detachment was commanded by Major-General Stiliyan Kovachev.

- 2nd Thracian Infantry Division (Major-General Kovachev)
  - 1st Brigade (Colonel Geshov)
    - 9th "Plovdiv" Infantry Regiment
    - 21st "Srednogorian" Infantry Regiment
  - 3rd Brigade (Colonel Mitov)
    - 27th "Chepinski" Infantry Regiment
    - 39th Infantry Regiment
  - 3rd QF FAR
  - 3rd MAR
  - 1st MAR

=== Unit strengths ===
The basic Bulgarian infantry division consisted of three infantry brigades, each of two infantry regiments, with each regiment containing four infantry battalions. Additionally these divisions contained two artillery regiments, a cavalry regiment and an engineer battalion. Their full battle strength consisted of 24 infantry battalions while their total strength made them the equivalent of an army corps. Due to tactical necessities the 1st and 6th divisions each gave one brigade for the formation of a new 10th division and fought during the war with a battle strength of 16 battalions.

== Second phase (1913) ==
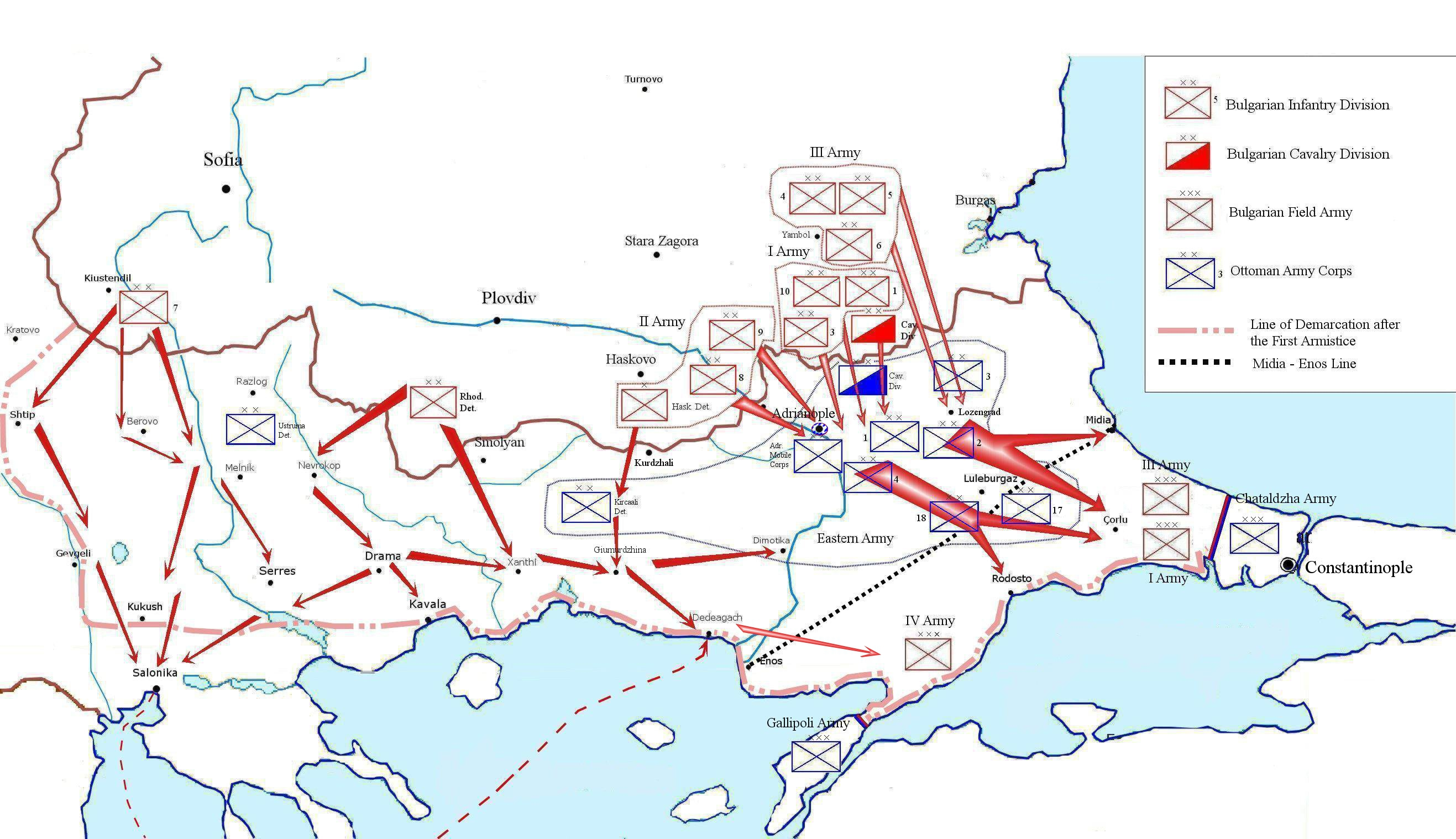
Bulgarian military operations during the First Balkan War

The following is the Bulgarian order of battle at the beginning of the second phase of the First Balkan War as of January 21, 1913. This order of battle includes all combat units, including engineer and artillery units, but not medical, supply, signal and border guard units.

=== Background ===
After the First Battle of Çatalca the Bulgarian and Ottoman governments concluded an armistice on 3 December [O.S. 20 November] 1912 and agreed to attend a peace conference in London. For almost a month the talks at St. James's Palace achieved very little when on 10 January [O.S. 23 January] 1913 the Young Turks, led by Enver Bey staged a coup and seized power in Constantinople. The new government was determined to hold on to Adrianople at all costs, a position which Bulgaria viewed as unacceptable and led to the denouncement of the armistice on 16 of January 1913. With the initiative in their hands and with a renewed sense of confidence in their war leaders and in their ability to successfully fight the Bulgarians, the Ottomans decided to execute an offensive plan that was devised in mid December 1912. Leaving their small remaining forces in Epirus and Albania on their own the Ottomans focused entirely on the Thracian Theater where they planned a full-scale, corps level, amphibious invasion on the western shore of the Sea of Marmara was to be attempted with simultaneous attacks by the provisional corps on the Gallipoli Peninsula and the Çatalca Army, while the Adrianople garrison and conducted diversionary attacks.

=== Bulgarian preparations ===
During the armistice the Bulgarians took several important measures to improve their strategic and tactical situation in Thrace. As early as December 1912 they realized that the rear of their Second Army at Adrianople or of their First and Third Armies could have easily been threatened by a large Ottoman offensive using the Gallipoli Peninsula as its staging point. To counter this threat the Bulgarian high command decided to transfer all its forces that were previously fighting on the Western Theater as they had fulfilled their objectives there and on 15 of December 1912 formed the new Fourth Army. It was a powerful force of 93,389 men under the command of Major General Stiliyan Kovachev. Meanwhile at Adrianople the formation of a new 11th Infantry Division and the arrival of two Serbian infantry divisions allowed the Bulgarians to divert additional forces to support the armies on the Chataldzha line. In general the Bulgarians had the capture of Adrianople as their priority while the remaining three field armies of some 284,121 men were to assume a defensive stance and repel the Ottoman offensive.

==== Chataldzha Line ====
First Army was commanded by Lieutenant-General Vasil Kutinchev, who was also appointed commander of the combined First and Third armies.

- 1st Sofia Infantry Division ( Major-General Toshev)
  - 1st Brigade
    - 1st "Sofia" Infantry Regiment
    - 6th "Turnovo" Infantry Regiment
  - 2nd Brigade
    - 37th Infantry Regiment
    - 38th Infantry Regiment
  - 4th QF FAR (Note: Quick-firing field artillery regiment (QF FAR), mountain artillery regiment (MAR).)
  - 4th FAR
  - 1st Pioneer Battalion
- 3rd Balkan Infantry Division ( Major-General Sarafov)
  - 1st Brigade
    - 11th "Sliven" Infantry Regiment
    - 24th "Black Sea" Infantry Regiment
  - 2nd Brigade
    - 29th "Yambol" Infantry Regiment
    - 32nd "Zagora" Infantry Regiment
  - 3rd Brigade
    - 41st Infantry Regiment
    - 42nd Infantry Regiment
  - 6th QF FAR
  - 6th FAR
  - 3rd Pioneer Battalion
- 6th Bdin Infantry Division ( Major-General Tenev)
  - 1st Brigade
    - 3rd "Bdin" Infantry Regiment
    - 15th "Lom" Infantry Regiment
  - 2nd Brigade
    - 35th "Vratsa" Infantry Regiment
    - 36th "Kozloduy" Infantry Regiment
  - 2nd QF FAR
  - 6th Pioneer Battalion
- 10th Infantry Division ( Major-General Bradistilov)
  - 1st Brigade
    - 16th "Lovech" Infantry Regiment
    - 25th "Dragoman" Infantry Regiment
  - 2nd Brigade
    - 47th Infantry Regiment
    - 48th Infantry Regiment
  - 10th FAR
  - 10th Pioneer Battalion

Third Army was commanded by Lieutenant-General Radko Dimitriev.

- 4th Preslav Infantry Division ( Major-General Boyadzhiev)
  - 1st Brigade
    - 7th "Preslav" Infantry Regiment
    - 19th "Shumen" Infantry Regiment
  - 2nd Brigade
    - 8th "Primorski" Infantry Regiment
    - 31st "Varna" Infantry Regiment
  - 3rd Brigade
    - 43rd Infantry Regiment
    - 44th Infantry Regiment
  - 5th QF FAR
  - 5th FAR
  - 5th Pioneer Battalion
- 5th Danube Infantry Division ( Major-General Hristov)
  - 1st Brigade
    - 2nd "Iskar" Infantry Regiment
    - 5th "Danube" Infantry Regiment
  - 2nd Brigade
    - 18th "Etarski" Infantry Regiment
    - 20th "Dobruja" Infantry Regiment
  - 3rd Brigade
    - 45th Infantry Regiment
    - 46th "Troyan" Infantry Regiment
  - 1st QF FAR
  - 1st FAR
  - 5th Pioneer Battalion
- 9th Pleven Infantry Division ( Major-General Sirakov)
  - 1st Brigade
    - 4th "Pleven" Infantry Regiment
    - 17th "Dorostol" Infantry Regiment
  - 2nd Brigade
    - 33rd "Svishtov" Infantry Regiment
    - 34th "Troyan" Infantry Regiment
  - 9th QF FAR
  - 9th Pioneer Battalion

==== Gallipoli Peninsula ====
Fourth Army was commanded by Major-General Stiliyan Kovachev.

- 2nd Thracian Infantry Division ( Colonel Geshov)
  - 1st Brigade
    - 9th "Plovdiv" Infantry Regiment
    - 21st "Srednogorian" Infantry Regiment
  - 3rd Brigade
    - 27th "Chepinski" Infantry Regiment
    - 39th Infantry Regiment
  - 3rd QF FAR
  - 3rd MAR**
  - 2nd Pioneer Battalion
- 7th Rila Infantry Division ( Major-General Todorov)
  - 1st Brigade
    - 13th "Rila" Infantry Regiment
    - 28th "Pernik" Infantry Regiment
    - 22nd "Thracian" Infantry Regiment
  - 2nd Brigade
    - 14th "Macedonian" Infantry Regiment
  - 3rd Brigade
    - 49th Infantry Regiment
    - 50th Infantry Regiment
  - 7th QF FAR
  - 7th FAR
  - 2nd MAR
  - 5th Cavalry Regiment
  - 7th Pioneer Battalion
- Cavalry Division ( Major-General Nazlamov)
  - 1st Brigade
    - 2nd Cavalry Regiment
    - 4th Cavalry Regiment
    - 7th Cavalry Regiment
  - Mixed Cavalry Brigade
    - 1st Cavalry Regiment
    - 3rd Cavalry Regiment
    - 6th Cavalry Regiment
  - 2/2 Infantry Brigade
    - 28th "Stremski" Infantry Regiment
    - 40th Infantry Regiment
  - 2/3 QF FAR Section
  - 1/3 QF Howitzer Battery
- Macedonian-Adrianopolitan Volunteer Corps ( Major-General Genev)
  - 1st Brigade
    - 1st "Debar" Infantry Battalion
    - 2nd "Skopie" Infantry Battalion
    - 3rd "Solun" Infantry Battalion
    - 4th "Bitolia" Infantry Battalion
  - 2nd Brigade
    - 5th "Odrin" Infantry Battalion
    - 6th "Ohrid" Infantry Battalion
    - 7th "Kumanovo" Infantry Battalion
    - 8th "Kostur" Infantry Battalion
  - 3rd Brigade
    - 9th "Veles" Infantry Battalion
    - 10th "Prilep" Infantry Battalion
    - 11th "Serres" Infantry Battalion
    - 12th "Lozengrad" Infantry Battalion
  - 2/2 QF FAR Section
  - 4/4 MAR Section

==== Adrianople ====
Second Army was commanded by lieutenant-general Nikola Ivanov.

- 8th Tundzha Infantry Division ( Major-General Kirkov)
  - 1st Brigade
    - 12th "Balkan" Infantry Regiment
    - 23rd "Shipka" Infantry Regiment
  - 2nd Brigade
    - 10th "Rhodope" Infantry Regiment
    - 30th "Sheinovo" Infantry Regiment
  - 3rd Brigade
    - 51st Infantry Regiment
    - 52nd Infantry Regiment
  - 8th QF FAR
  - 8th FAR
  - 8th Pioneer Battalion
- 11th Infantry Division ( Major-General Velchev)
  - 1st Brigade
    - 55th Infantry Regiment
    - 56th Infantry Regiment
  - 2nd Brigade
    - 57th Infantry Regiment
    - 58th Infantry Regiment
  - 11th FAR
- 3/9 Infantry Brigade (Major-General Grancharov)
  - 53rd Infantry Regiment
  - 54th Infantry Regiment
  - 2/9 QF FAR Section
- Second Serbian Army was commanded by General Stepa Stepanović.
  - Timok Division I Line
  - Danube Division II Line
