= Mobilization of the Bulgarian Army in 1915 =

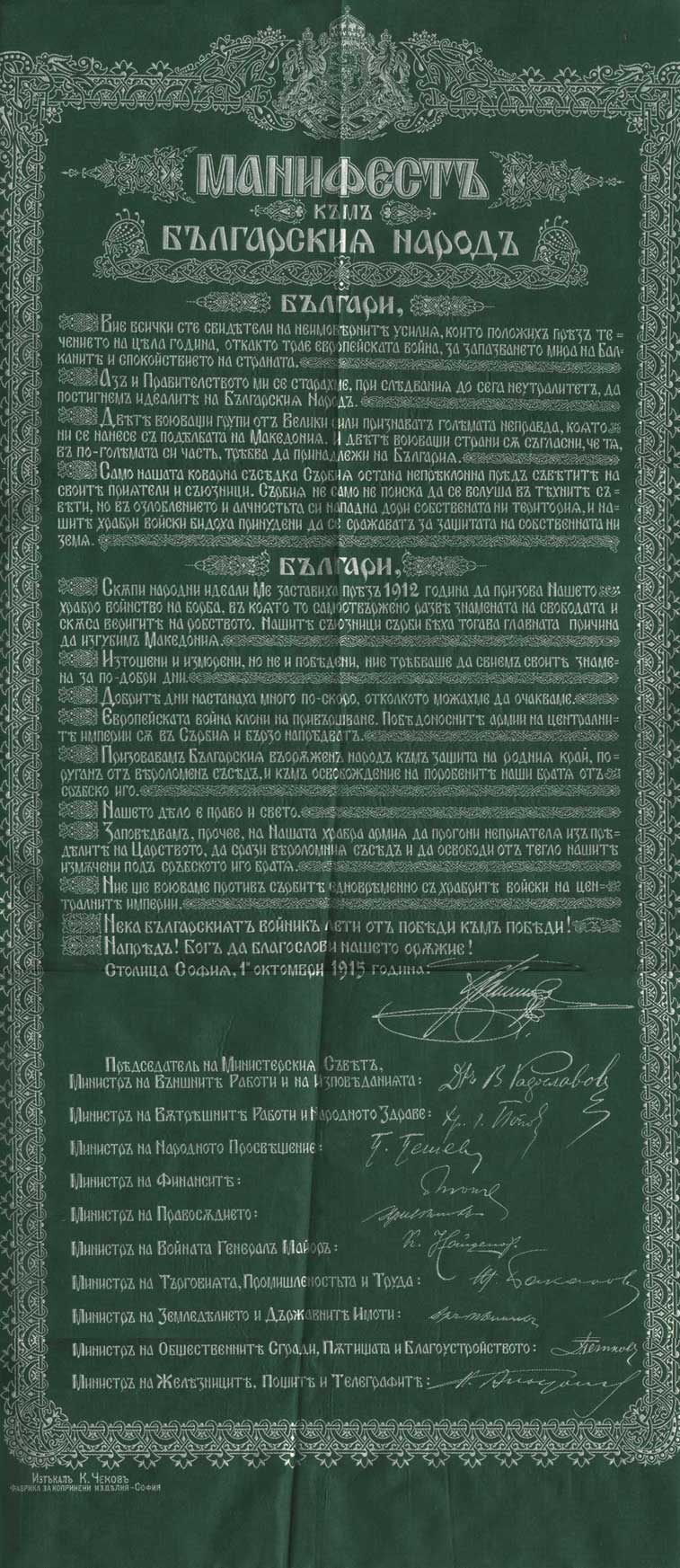
Manifesto of the Bulgarian Tsar Ferdinand I, declaring war against Serbia

The mobilization of the Bulgarian Army on the eve of the Kingdom of Bulgaria's entry into World War I took place between 11 and 30 September 1915. It was a direct consequence of the military convention between the German Empire, Austria-Hungary and Bulgaria and the Treaty of Friendship and Alliance between Bulgaria and Germany that were signed on 6 September, marking the official alignment of the country with the Central Powers.

== Preparations for the mobilization ==
The overall internal situation of Bulgaria following the two Balkan Wars remained greatly strained. The acquisition of around 18,000 km^{2} of new land with its over 400,000 inhabitants failed to compensate for the loss of Southern Dobrudja, one of the country's most fertile regions; the approximately 176,000 casualties; and enormous financial costs. Agriculture, which was the leading sector of the economy, was badly affected and could no longer rely on Southern Dobrudja's annual grain harvest of up to 150,000 tonnes. The number of available horses, sheep and cattle was also lower when compared with 1912. Annual meat production was about 105,629 tonnes when the amount needed to sustain an army of 600,000 for a year was estimated at 87,600 tonnes. External trade and the public finances in this period were also characterized by a widening negative imbalance. It was reckoned that in case of war the country could not afford to feed, clothe and replace the manpower losses of an army greater than half a million men without severely undermining the economy.

Following the end of the Second Balkan War the Bulgarian Army was demobilized and brought to a peacetime level of 5,220 officers and 80,079 soldiers. The Bulgarian General Staff initially drafted several mobilization plans that required the armed forces to be deployed in times of war much in the same manner as in the First Balkan War in regards to their structure and organization. However, the analysis of the army's performance during the Balkan Wars yielded several lessons that served as the basis for several important structural changes in the planned wartime organization of the army and its units. Specifically, some of the infantry regiments were reformed to include three battalions instead of the usual four, new Etappe regiments were created (each army and division had one attached to it), and the two artillery regiments of each division formed an artillery brigade.

== Mobilization ==
Late in the evening of 9 September 1915, tsar Ferdinand and prime minister Vasil Radoslavov signed a decree of general mobilization declaring 11 September as its first operational day. The Bulgarian General Staff began carrying out all the tasks concerning the mobilization. Special attention was focused on the border with Serbia where the main Bulgarian forces had to be deployed. This was necessary as the Serbian high command was aware of the Bulgarian preparations and had deployed half its fully mobilized and organized army on the Bulgarian border, ready to deliver a heavy blow against the Bulgarian Army while it was still in a vulnerable stage of mobilization and concentration. This bold idea however was soon dropped because the Allied command still thought that Bulgaria could be persuaded to join the Entente.

The initial phase of the mobilization was carried out with comparatively few difficulties but still was slower and lacked the widely displayed enthusiasm of its counterpart in 1912. The forces began deploying on the fifth day after the mobilization was ordered. Three armies were activated - two of them were to be used against Serbia and one was kept for protection of the border with Romania. Additional forces had to be posted to guard the still neutral Greece which had a defensive treaty with Serbia.

The mobilization period lasted between 17 and 18 days, during which it was covered from the Serbians only by border guards. By the end of September the total number of mobilized personnel reached 15,908 officers and 600,772 soldiers (12-13% of the population), some 19,224 reservists however were absent. These forces were divided between the three field armies, several independent units and the troops stationed in the interior of the country. As planned and agreed with the Military Convention the 1st Army concentrated on the old border with Serbia and was placed under the command of Army Group Mackensen. The 2nd Army was deployed against Vardar Macedonia and remained under direct Bulgarian control. The 3rd Army was tasked with the protection of the Romanian border. Two divisions were stationed on the Greek border and another one was kept as reserve of the high command.

A total of 390 battalions were mobilized - some 232 infantry and 11 pioneer battalions within the eleven infantry divisions containing 469,140 men; another 75 battalions containing 86,444 men were independent; 31 militia and 41 supplementary battalions containing 64,845 men remained in the interior of the country. The artillery of various caliber was deployed in 219 batteries - 94 batteries with 409 guns in the 1st Army, 44 batteries with 182 guns in the 2nd Army, 50 batteries with 401 guns in the 3rd Army and 31 batteries with 130 guns in the three independent divisions. The cavalry mobilized around 62 squadrons.

All but one division retained the three infantry brigade structure typical for a Bulgarian division. The total personnel of most divisions was over 40,000 men, which made them the equivalent of the army corps in other armies.

The material situation of the mobilized army fell short of expectations as there were 372,603 rifles instead of the 521,509 that were envisaged in the plans, each artillery gun had about 500 shells, and the army was also short of clothes and footwear for all the troops.

== Order of battle following the mobilization ==
- 1st Army (commander Lt. Gen. Kliment Boyadzhiev)
  - 1st Sofia Infantry Division (commander Maj. Gen. Yanko Draganov)
  - 6th Bdin Infantry Division (commander Maj. Gen. Asen Papadopov)
  - 8th Tundzha Infantry Division (commander Maj. Gen. Todor Mitov)
  - 9th Pleven Infantry Division (commander Maj. Gen. Stefan Nerezov)
- 2nd Army (commander Lt. Gen. Georgi Todorov)
  - 3rd Balkan Infantry Division (commander Maj. Gen. Nikola Ribarov)
  - 7th Rila Infantry Division (commander Maj. Gen. Valko Vasilev)
  - 1st Cavalry Division (commander Maj. Gen. Aleksandar Tanev)
- 3rd Army (commander Lt. Gen. Stefan Toshev)
  - 4th Preslav Infantry Division (commander Maj. Gen. Panteley Kiselov)
  - 5th Danube Infantry Division (commander Maj. Gen. Panayot Barnev)
- 2nd Thracian Infantry Division (commander Maj. Gen. Dimitar Geshov)
- 10th Aegean Infantry Division (commander Maj. Gen. Ivan kolev)
- 11th Macedonian Infantry Division (commander Col. Krastyo Zlatarev)

== Aftermath ==
Following the mobilization of 1915 the Bulgarian General Staff was left with few unmobilized reservists. In order to secure a source of reinforcements for the army it opened new military schools for young infantry, cavalry, artillery officers and soldiers. Thus from the end of 1915 until the beginning of 1918 the four regular annual contingents of young conscripts were called and received their training. Their total number was 214,343 and was sufficient for the replacing the 181,515 casualties that had occurred. The exact number of all the mobilized men during the war however remains unclear. Some sources point at a number of 1,200,000 men which seems to be on the high side but still may be close to the truth. When trying to determine the precise number it must be taken into account that towards September 1918 the Bulgarian Army reached a strength ranging between 855,175 and 877,392 men under arms in all branches of the service, or some 18% of the population, and that for the duration of the war the army also used the manpower of the territories it had occupied – some 133,837 men from the Macedonian regions were mobilized.

== See also ==
- Bulgaria during World War I
