= Battle of Kula =

1885 military engagement

Battle of the fortress of Kula
- Part of Serbo–Bulgarian War
| Date | 3–4 November 1885 |
| Location | Kula, Principality of Bulgaria 43°53′20″N 22°31′20″E |
| Result | Serbian victory |

Belligerents
| Bulgaria | Serbia |

Commanders and leaders
| Alexander of Battenberg; Gancho Georgiev (POW) | Milan Obrenović |

Units involved
| Royal Bulgarian Army; Northern army | Royal Serbian Army; Timoshka army |

Casualties and losses
| 250 killed, wounded & captured during the battle 1,100 captured during retreat | 130 killed and wounded |

The Battle of Kula (Bulgarian: бой при Кула) was a military engagement between the Principality of Bulgaria and the Kingdom of Serbia which took place on 4 November 1885. It was part of the Serbo–Bulgarian War, provoked by a Serbian invasion of Bulgaria. Bulgarian troops counterattacked the Serbs after they captured the town of Kula but suffered a defeat. With this battle, the Bulgarian plans for an advance to Zaječar were thwarted, and the Serbian road to Vidin was opened.

== Battles ==
=== Serbian attack ===
The Serbian offensive in Northwestern Bulgaria began on 3 November, right after the invasion of Caribrod and the battle of Tran. Their Timoshka division, consisting of 7 battalions, 3 squadrons, 2 Polish batteries and engineering units, with a total of 6,200 soldiers and 12 guns under the command of Colonel Ilija Dzhuknich, crossed the border through the and captured Kula the same day after an hour of fighting in which the serbs had 60 killed and wounded but took more than 100 prisoners from the Bulgarian side.

Meanwhile, counting the delay of the offensive as a sign of the Serbian weakness along the Timok, the commander of the Northern Detachment, Captain Atanas Uzunov, ordered an "intensified reconnaissance" towards Zaječar. For this purpose, the Flying Detachment, including 900 regular soldiers, 100 cavalry and 6 guns, and the Main Reserve of the Northern Detachment, 3750 infantrymen, were designated. After knowing about the fall of Kula, Uzunov also sent two detachments from the Shumen volunteer regiment to the city.

=== Bulgarian counterattack ===
On the night of 3 to 4 November, the Reserve and the Flying Squad gathered in the village of Gramada and set off for Kula under the general command of Captain Georgi Todorov. Passing through the villages of Kosta Perchevo and Poletkovtsi, the next morning they went south-east and south of the town and opened fire as the Serbian vanguard that was advancing towards Vidin. The Serbs retreated to the fortifications built around Kula by the Turks during the Serbian–Ottoman Wars of 1876–1878. Taking advantage of the surprise, Captain Todorov captured one of the fortifications, and the commander of the Main Reserve, Captain Gancho Georgiev, managed to occupy the enemy's retreat route to Vrashka Chuka. However, his unit, composed mostly of untrained and poorly armed militiamen, fled at the first counterattack of the entrenched Serbs. Georgiev himself was surrounded and captured with a hundred soldiers, after the militia left in reserve also deserted. This is also a sign for Todorov to order a general retreat of the units of the Flying Squad, which is carried out in disorder under the pressure of the Serbian cavalry. The Bulgarians retreated.

== Results ==
Serbian losses in killed and wounded at Kula on 4 November amounted to 130 men. The Bulgarians lost around 250 killed or wounded and, including around 1,100 captured among the scattered militia during the retreat, total Bulgarian losses amount to 1,350. A week later, the Serbian army laid siege to Vidin, which the Bulgarians successfully defended until the end of the war, as the Serbs suffered a decisive defeat on the main front of the war further south.
