= Fethi Okyar =

2nd Prime Minister of the Republic of Turkey from 1924 to 1925

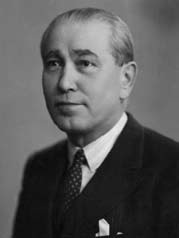

2nd Prime Minister of Turkey
- In office 22 November 1924 – 3 March 1925
- President: Mustafa Kemal Atatürk
- Preceded by: İsmet İnönü
- Succeeded by: İsmet İnönü

4th Prime Minister of the Government of the Grand National Assembly
- In office 14 August 1923 – 27 October 1923
- Preceded by: Rauf Orbay
- Succeeded by: İsmet İnönü (As Prime Minister of Turkey)

3rd Speaker of the Grand National Assembly
- In office 1 November 1923 – 22 November 1924
- President: Mustafa Kemal Atatürk
- Prime Minister: İsmet İnönü
- Preceded by: Mustafa Kemal Atatürk
- Succeeded by: Kâzım Özalp

Member of the Grand National Assembly
- In office 8 February 1935 – 7 May 1943
- Constituency: Bolu (1935, 1939, 1943)
- In office 28 June 1923 – 25 April 1931
- Constituency: Gümüşhane (1927); Istanbul (1923)

Member of the Chamber of Deputies
- Constituency: Istanbul (1917–1918); Monastir (1912)

Personal details
- Born: Ali Fethi; 29 April 1880 Prilep, Manastir Vilayet, Ottoman Empire (modern North Macedonia)
- Died: 7 May 1943 (aged 63) Istanbul, Turkey
- Party: Republican People's Party (1923–1930, 1930–1943); Liberal Republican Party (1930); Ottoman Liberal People's Party (1918–1919); Committee of Union and Progress (1907–1918)
- Education: Turkish Military Academy

Military service
- Allegiance: Ottoman Empire
- Branch/service: Ottoman Army
- Years of service: 1898–1923
- Rank: Lieutenant General
- Unit: Special Organization
- Battles/wars: Macedonian Struggle; 31 March Incident; Malissori uprising; Italo-Turkish War; Battle of Ain Zara; First Balkan War; Bulgarian Front; Battle of Bulair; Battle of Şarköy; Second Balkan War

Ali Fethi Okyar (29 April 1880 – 7 May 1943) was a Turkish diplomat and politician, who also served as a military officer and diplomat during the last decade of the Ottoman Empire. He was also the second Prime Minister of Turkey (1924–1925) and the second Speaker of the Turkish Parliament after Mustafa Kemal Atatürk.

== Early life ==
Ali Fethi (Okyar after 1934) was born in the Ottoman town of Prilep in Manastir Vilayet (present-day North Macedonia) to an Albanian family. His father was İsmail Hakkı Bey, a civil servant in the Ministry of Foreign Affairs who died when Ali Fethi was young. His uncle Müderris İbrahim Edhem Efendi, who was the Governor of Manastır at the time, helped to complete his education.

He attended the Monastir Military High School, where he was a friend of Mustafa Kemal (Atatürk), helping him with French and introducing him to French political thought. Politics began to interest him during this period, as he began reading Namık Kemal's works. Fethi entered the Military Academy with Kemal in 1898. There he befriended figures like Ali Fuat (Cebesoy), Şevket, Cafer Tayyar (Eğilmez), Kara Vasıf, and Mürsel. He went further into dangerous literature, reading books smuggled into the country by the Committee of Union and Progress. He had the opportunity to read the works of Montesquieu, Voltaire, Rousseau, Mirebeau, and Robespierre. Tevfik Fikret's works were also among those read. With the impressions these works left on his own worlds; he joined in the discussions he had with his friends about exile, oppression, and freedom. After graduating from the Harbiye with the rank of "Infantry Lieutenant" in 1900, he continued his education in the War Institute, graduating top of his class in 1903.

== Career in the Ottoman Empire ==
In 1904, Fethi was assigned as a staff captain in the Third Army in Salonika. During his internship training he faced off against Bulgarian, Serbian, and Greek chetas in the Macedonian Struggle. In the summer of 1906 he was sent to Third Army's Mahçova (Metsovo) Greek Border Zone Command after he was appointed a teaching role at the Edirne War School he didn't want. In March 1907 he was appointed to the Salonika Eastern Railway Line Inspectorate. Upon the suggestion of Rumelia Inspector Hüseyin Hilmi Pasha, he was appointed as the commander of the Salonika Gendarmerie Officer's School on 21 March 1908 and promoted to Major.

=== Revolutionary career ===
In 1907, he was indicted into the Committee of Union and Progress by İsmail Enver Bey. He returned to Kesriye (Kastoria) and established a CUP cell there. He quickly became an important member, becoming a member of its Salonika central committee. He also worked to induct new members for the CUP. When Mustafa Kemal was assigned to the Third Army in Selanik in October 1907, Fethi made sure to induct him into the committee, and also for Mustafa İsmet (İnönü). As membership in the committee increased, new branches cells were formed, many of which were administered by him. After Paris and Salonika became the two centers of the CUP, it was Fethi that handled communication between Salonika and other branches.

Following the Reval meetings between King Edward VII and Tsar Nicholas II, on 25 June, 1908, Ali Fethi Bey participated in the CUP meeting in Manyasizade Refik Bey's house to initiate a revolution. On the night before Abdul Hamid II capitulated to the revolutionaries, Fethi accepted Talât Bey's request for him to write the declaration of the constitution.

After the revolution, he was appointed the Paris Military Attaché by the Minister of War Mahmut Şevket Pasha in January 1909, but took up his post in March, serving until 1911. During his duty he returned to Salonika to participate in the Action Army. Returning from Istanbul, he accompanied Abdul Hamid II to his house arrest in Salonika, where he served as his guard at the Villa Allatini for more than three months.

During his second period as attaché to Paris Fethi observed the Picardie maneuvers with Mustafa Kemal and Hüseyin Selahattin Bey. He spent most of his time between 1910–1911 writing reports on the maneuvers for the General Staff. He returned to the Ottoman Empire to put down the Malissori uprising.

=== Tripolitanian war ===
On 29 September 1911, Italy declared war on Turkey for Tripolitania. He joined the Unionists that resolved to organize a resistance against the Italians. Ali Fethi went by way of Paris with Ambassador Rıfat's assistance. He also asked for help from SFIO leaders Jean Jaures and Pierre Loti, and the two of them wrote articles criticizing the Italian occupation. Fethi first reached the port of Sfax in French Tunisia with five military medical doctors and a boatman from Marseille, and arrived in Tripoli on 12 October 1911. He was appointed chief of staff of the 42nd Division, commanded by Colonel Neşet Pasha, and took to organizing local militia groups against the Italians. In Tripoli, he reported to division command that Italian soldiers were abusing the civilian population, and requested that the European public be made aware of it. Fethi played an important role in the Battle of Ain Zara, but outnumbered and outgunned, the Italians took the oasis. However the Italians couldn't advance beyond Ain Zara into December and January, they lost control over Sedra, failed to take Homs and retreated back to Ain Zara.

In April 1912, he was elected deputy of Monastir in that year's general election for the Chamber of Deputies. After the closure of the Chamber, he returned to Tripoli. However by the start of the First Balkan War, Ali Fethi and other officers had to return to the capital.

=== Balkan Wars ===
Fethi was given command over the Dardanelles Strait Staff on 25 November 1912. When the London Conference unsuccessfully concluded on 29 January 1913 (due to the regime change of the 1913 coup d'état), the Bulgarian armies resumed their offensive on the Çatalca line, surrounded Edirne, and advanced on the Gallipoli peninsula; squeezing the Bolayır Corps into a narrow line, where Fethi and Kemal fought alongside each other. Battle plans were drawn up for an operation to relieve Edirne, which included an amphibious landing at the Bolayır line and Şarköy. The aim was to surround the Bulgarians between the two lines. However due to the complexity of the operation and last minute criticisms the two forces failed to link up and land on time. The Tenth Corps commanded by Hurşit Pasha and Staff Officer Enver Pasha landed successfully, but Bolayır Corps commanded by Fahri Pasha and Staff Officer Ali Fethi (Mustafa Kemal Director of the Operations Department) suffered many casualties upon landing in Şarköy. Despite all the losses, Enver Pasha insisted on attacking Şarköy again, despite Fahri Pasha, Ali Fethi and Mustafa Kemal's opposition. The commanders of the two corps blamed each other for the defeat. As a result of the defeat, Ali Fethi and Mustafa Kemal attempted to submit their resignations, but they were not accepted. The Bulgarians captured Edirne on 26 March, and the city was lost with the Treaty of London on 30 May 1913.

In July 1913, the Second Balkan War broke out over Bulgaria and Serbia's disagreements over captured territory, and the Ottoman Empire soon entered the war to retake lost Rumelian territory. Fethi's Bolayır Corps participated in the operations to retake Edirne from Bulgaria, but Enver Pasha's troops retook the city first. Fethi resigned from military service immediately after returning from the war on 14 September 1913.

== Last days of the Ottoman Empire ==
Ali Fethi was elected as the secretary general of the CUP in an abortive attempt to liberalize the party, but quickly resigned and sent to Sofia on a diplomatic exile. There he kept up with Mustafa Kemal, who was also in Sofia as a military attaché.

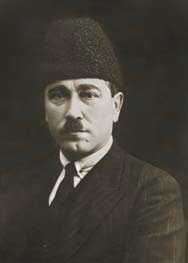
In the 1920s

On 8 December 1917 he was elected as a deputy of Istanbul in a by-election and left his ambassadorial post.

After the fall of the CUP government, he became the Minister of the Interior in the Ahmet İzzet Pasha government, per Mustafa Kemal's suggestion. He was accused of letting the CUP leaders escape the country, which caused the resignation of Ahmet İzzet Pasha's cabinet. With the fall of the CUP, Ali Fethi founded the Ottoman Liberal People's Party, which largely consisted of liberal Unionists. He published the newspaper Minber together with Mustafa Kemal between 1 November and 21 December 1918, as an organ of the party. The party was banned on 5 May 1919 for being a continuation of the CUP, and a few days later, on 10 March 1919 he was arrested for being a member of a secret Unionist organization, and was exiled to Malta on 2 June 1919. He was released in a prisoner exchange on 30 May 1921.

He joined the First Grand National Assembly as an Istanbul Deputy on 15 August 1921. He served as the Minister of Internal Affairs between 10 October 1921 and 4 October 1922. He was re-elected in the 1923 election. He served as the Chairman of the Executive Board (Prime Minister of the Ankara government) and Minister of Internal Affairs from August 14, 1923 until the declaration of the Republic. The political events that led to the resignation of the Fethi Bey cabinet led to the declaration of the Republic of Turkey with a constitutional amendment on 29 October 1923.

== During the Republic ==
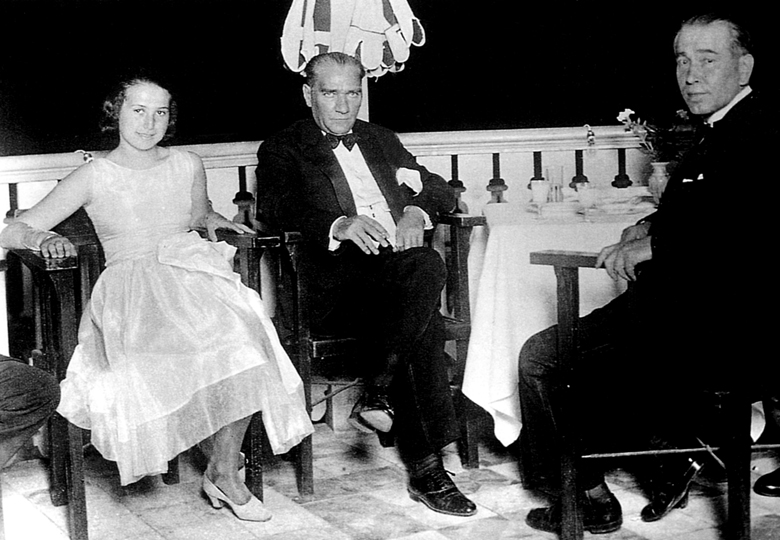
Atatürk, Okyar, and his daughter Nermin (Kırdar), 13 August 1930

Immediately after the declaration of the Republic, he was elected as the President of the Grand National Assembly on 1 November 1923, and reelected the next year. However, in November 1924, a group of deputies led by Kazım Karabekir and Ali Fuat Pasha founded the Progressive Republican Party as an opposition party, and on 22 November 1924, Ali Fethi was appointed Prime Minister, replacing İsmet. Fethi's reconciliatory politics were intended to be more tolerable than İsmet Pasha's hardliner stance. However, three months later, Fethi's strategy failed when the Sheikh Said Rebellion broke out in the East. On 2 March 1925, Fethi and his government resigned, and İsmet Pasha became Prime Minister again. The same day, the Law for the Establishment of Peace [Takrir-i Sükûn Kanunu] silenced opposition nationwide. The Progressive Party was closed, and Fethi Bey requested to be appointed as ambassador to Paris.

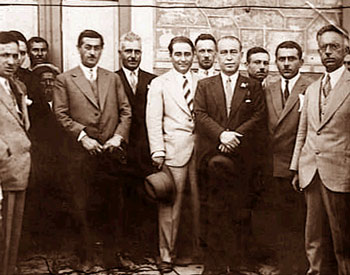
Okyar and leaders of the Liberal Republican Party. Adnan Menderes (left) would become prime minister in 1950

Atatürk long attempted to liberalize Turkey's political system and establish an opposition party. On 9 August 1930, per his instruction, Fethi resigned from the ambassadorship and returned to Turkey, founding the Liberal Republican Party [Serbest Cumhuriyet Fırkası] and became the party's chairman. He was allowed to re-enter the parliament as deputy of Gümüşhane. However it quickly became clear that the opposition party was attracting reactionaries and Islamists so he dissolved his own party on 17 November, heeding Atatürk's request. He went abroad again.

In 1933, he contracted heart failure. Learning of his friend's illness, Atatürk assigned his aide Salih Bozok as his companion and arranged for Fethi Bey to receive treatment in Vienna. He was appointed to as Ambassador to London on 31 March 1934, where he played an important role in the rapprochement between Turkey and the United Kingdom before World War II; he was among the architects of the Montreux Convention. He received the surname "Okyar". Shortly after Atatürk's death, in accordance with President İsmet İnönü's policy of reconciliation with his former enemies, he returned to the country and was rehabilitated, being appointed as Deputy of Bolu on 4 January 1939, winning reelection the same year. He became the Minister of Justice in the 2nd Refik Saydam Cabinet and continued this duty until 12 March 1941. He died in Istanbul on 7 May 1943. His grave is in Zincirlikuyu cemetery.

== Personal life ==
He was married to Galibe Hanım (1899–1981). British intelligence reports described the couple as “the Turkish Greta Garbo and her ambassador husband with a Tatar’s looks.” They had two children, a son Osman (1917–2002) and a daughter Nermin (1919–1999). The Okyars were close friends of Atatürk and Latife.

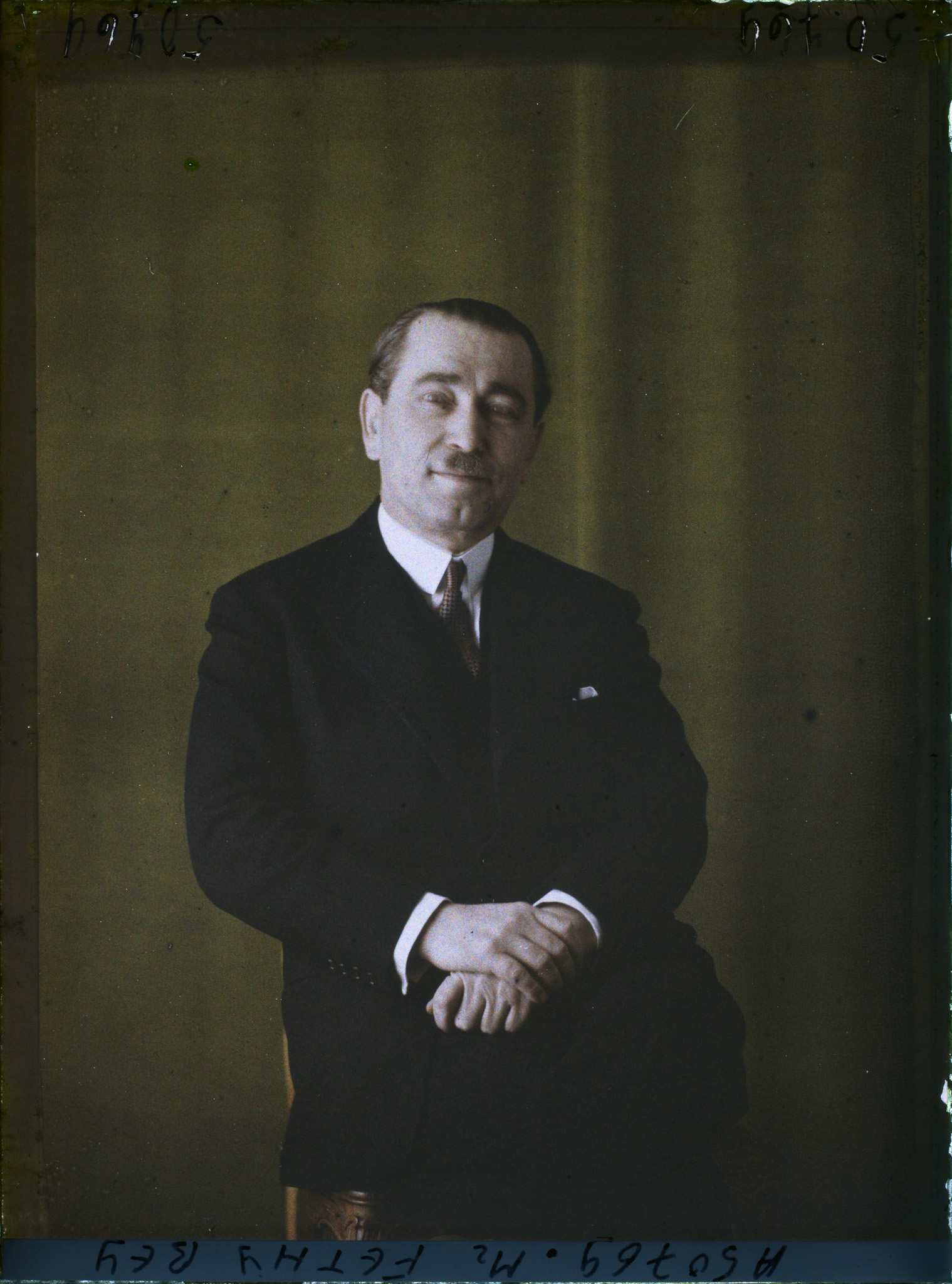
Autochrome portrait of Ali Fethi Okyar, c. 1928

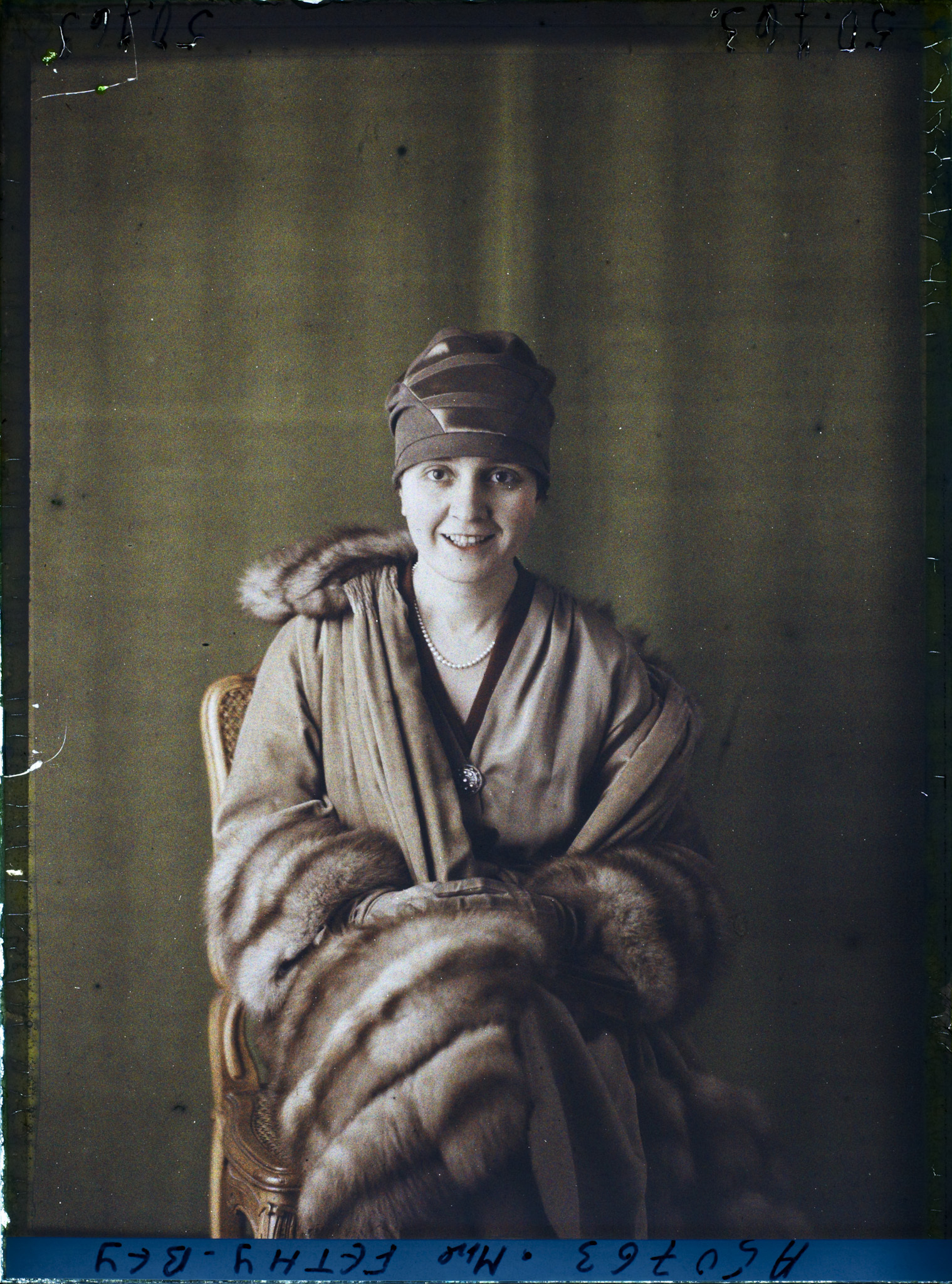
Autochrome portrait of Galibe Okyar, c. 1928

== Bibliography ==
- Balkaya, İhsan Sabri (2005). Ali Fethi Okyar (29 April-7 May 1943) (in Turkish) (I. ed.). Ankara: Turkish History Association. ISBN 9751617162.
- Çay, Abdulhaluk Mehmet (2009). Başlangıçtan Bugüne Türkiye Cumhuriyeti Hükümetleri (PDF) (in Turkish). Künüçen, Hale. Ankara: Turkey Ministry of Culture and Tourism, Culture Portal. Archived from the original (PDF) on 1 May 2020.
- Güneş, İhsan (August 2012). Özmel Akın, Nur; Güven, Pınar (eds.). Meşrutiyet'ten Cumhuriyet'e Türkiye'de Hükümetler: Programları ve Meclisteki Yankıları (1908-1923) (in Turkish) (I. ed.). Istanbul: Turkey İş Bank Cultural Publications. ISBN 9786053606512.
- Okyar, Ali Fethi; Şarman, Kamsu (December 2016). Yalçın, Emre (ed.). Büyük Günlerin Adamı: Fethi Okyar'ın Hayatından Kareler (I. ed.). Istanbul: Turkey İş Bank Cultural Publications. ISBN 9786053329091.
- Okyar, Ali Fethi (November 2017). Bostancı, Eyyup (ed.). Sultan II. Abdülhamid Han'la 113 Gün [113 Days with Sultan Abdülhamid II] (in Turkish). Istanbul: Akıl Fikir Yayınları. ISBN 9786059790970.
- Okyar, Fethi; Kutay, Cemal (1980). Üç Devir'de Bir Adam (I. ed.). Istanbul: Tercüman Yayınları.

Political offices
Preceded by Rauf Orbay	Prime Minister of Turkey; 14 August 1923 – 23 October 1923	Succeeded by İsmet İnönü
Preceded by Mustafa Kemal Atatürk	Speaker of the Parliament of Turkey; 1 November 1923 – 22 November 1924	Succeeded by Kâzım Özalp
Preceded by İsmet İnönü	Prime Minister of Turkey; 22 November 1924 – 3 March 1925	Succeeded by İsmet İnönü
Preceded by Kâzım Özalp	Minister of National Defense; 22 November 1924 – 3 March 1925	Succeeded by Recep Peker
Preceded by Tevfik Fikret Sılay	Minister of Justice; 27 May 1939 – 13 March 1941	Succeeded by Hasan Menemencioğlu
