= Battle of Şarköy =

Battles of the First Balkan War

- Part of the Bulgarian front of the First Balkan War
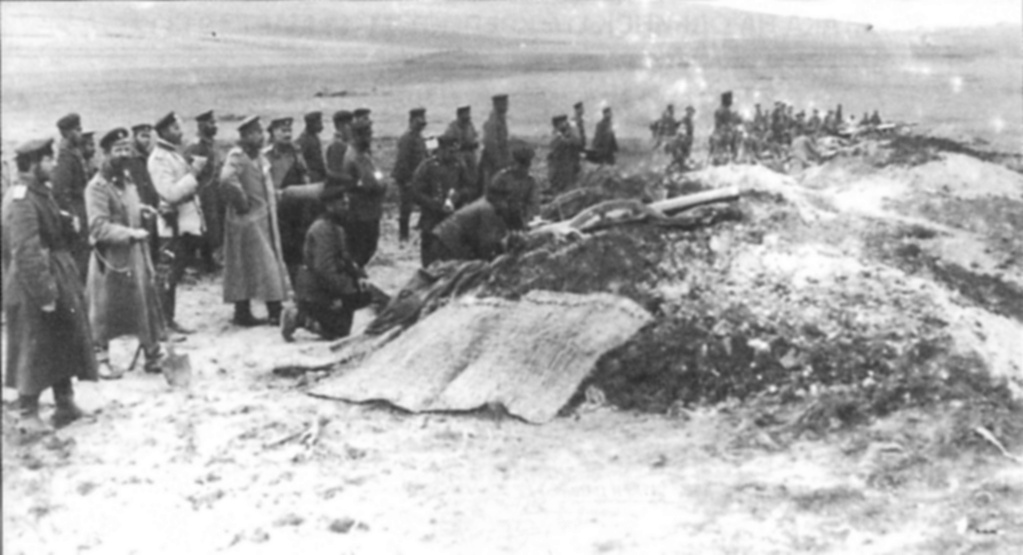
- Bulgarian artillery in position
| Date | 9–11 February 1913 |
| Location | Şarköy, Gelibolu District, Adrianople Vilayet, Ottoman Empire (present day: Şarköy, Turkey) |
| Result | Bulgarian victory |

Belligerents
| Bulgaria | Ottoman Empire |

Commanders and leaders
| (Bulgaria) Stiliyan Kovachev | Enver Bey |

Strength
| Macedonian-Adrianopolitan Volunteer Corps; 2nd Thracian Division | 19,858 officers and men, 3,744 animals, 15,405 rifles, 16 machine guns, 48 artillery, 23,542 ammunition boxes Naval: Torpedo cruiser Berk-i Satvet, cruiser Mecidiye, battleships Turgut Reis and Barbaros Hayreddin |

Casualties and losses
| Unknown | 2,779 casualties; 882 killed; 1,842 wounded; 55 missing |

The Battle of Şarköy or Şarköy operation (Bulgarian: Битка при Шаркьой, Turkish: Şarköy Çıkarması) took place between 9 and 11 February 1913 during the First Balkan War between Bulgaria and the Ottoman Empire. The Ottomans attempted a counter-attack but were defeated by the Bulgarians at the Battles of Bulair and Şarköy.

== Background ==
On January 29, 1913, a coup d'état was carried out in the Ottoman Empire, led by the Young Turk leader Enver Bey. Five days later (February 3), the new government renewed hostilities against the countries of the Balkan League. Ottoman troops launched an offensive against the Bulgarian positions at Çatalca (near Istanbul) and Bulair (near Gallipoli) with the aim of lifting the siege of Edirne. The landing at Şarköy in the rear of the main Bulgarian forces was to contribute to the success of these operations.

== Battle ==
On 7 February, the Ottoman Tenth Corps (15,000 soldiers) was embarked at Yeşilköy (near Istanbul) and several other ports onto 32 transport ships. They approached the landing site under the cover of a military squadron consisting of three armored cruisers and several smaller vessels. According to the plan, the landing was to begin at 7:00 am on 8 February, simultaneously with the offensive at Bulair. However, the landing of the troops did not begin until 1:00 pm, 3 km west of Şarköy, in a section of the coast not guarded by Bulgarian troops. The Ottoman units advanced eastwards and northwards and, near the city, encountered two companies of the Macedonian-Adrianopolitan Volunteer Corps. Despite the Ottoman numerical superiority, they managed to hold out in Şarköy until the evening, when they retreated in an organized manner.

Despite the bad weather, new Ottoman troops landed on the coast on February 9. The Bulgarian command transferred to the area of the fighting the main units of the Macedonian-Adrianopolitan Volunteers (commanded by Major General Nikola Genev), the Second Brigade of the Second Thracian Infantry Division and the Fiftieth Infantry Regiment. On February 10, the Bulgarian troops launched an offensive and pressed the Ottoman units towards the coast of the Sea of Marmara. At that time, it became clear that the Ottoman offensive from Gallipoli had been thwarted in the battle of Bulair. Continuing the landing became pointless and the Ottomans retreated. Subjected to heavy fire from the Bulgarian artillery, the Tenth Corps was again loaded onto ships and transferred to Gallipoli.

== Sources ==
- Vŭchkov, Aleksandŭr. (2005). The Balkan War 1912-1913. Angela. ISBN 954-90587-4-3.
- Erickson, Edward J. (2003). Defeat in Detail: The Ottoman Army in the Balkans, 1912–1913. Greenwood Publishing Group. ISBN 0-275-97888-5.
- Özakman, Turgut (1997). Vahidettin, M. Kemal ve milli mücadele: Yalanlar, yanlışlar, yutturmacalar [Vahidettin, M. Kemal and the National Struggle: Lies, Mistakes, Deceptions] (in Turkish). Bilgi Yayınevi. ISBN 975-494-669-8.
- Markov, Georgi (1989). Balgariya v Balkanskiya sayuz sreshtu Osmanskata imperiya, 1912–1913 [Bulgaria in the Balkan League against the Ottoman Empire, 1912–1913] (in Bulgarian). Sofia: Nauka i izkustvo.
- Ministerstvo na voynata, Shtab na armiyata, Voenno-istoricheska komisiya (1933). Voynata mezhdu Balgariya i Turtsiya 1912–1913: Deystviyata na Trakiyskiya operatsionen teatar ot parvoto primirie do kraya na voynata [The War Between Bulgaria and Turkey 1912–1913: Operations in the Thracian Theater from the First Armistice to the End of the War] (in Bulgarian). Vol. VII. Sofia: Darzhavna pechatnitsa.
