= Battle of Merhamli =

1912 battle in Evros, Greece

- Part of the Bulgarian front of the First Balkan War
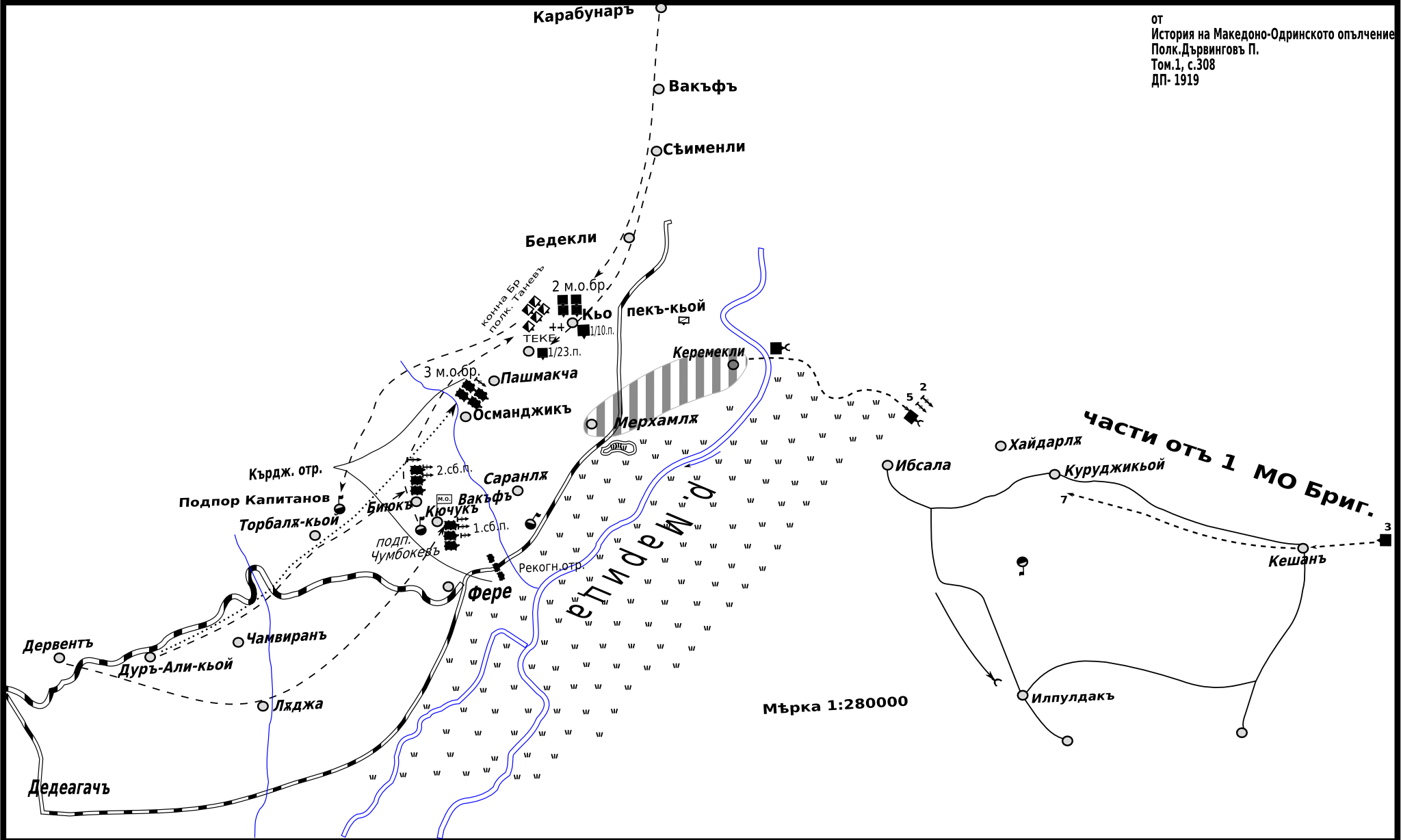
- Battle of Merhamli
Date	27 November 1912
Location	Merhamli, Adrianople Vilayet, Ottoman Empire (today Peplos, Feres, Evros, Greece) 40°57′N 26°16′E
Result	Bulgarian victory

Belligerents
Bulgaria	Ottoman Empire

Commanders and leaders
(Bulgaria) Nikola Genev (Bulgaria) Aleksandar Tanev (Bulgaria) Andranik Ozanian	(Ottoman Empire) Mehmed Yaver Pasha (POW)

Strength
Unknown	10,000

Casualties and losses
Light	9,600 captured

The Battle of Merhamli was part of the First Balkan War between the armies of Bulgaria and the Ottoman Empire which took place on 14/27 November 1912. After a long chase throughout Western Thrace the Bulgarian troops led by General Nikola Genev and Colonel Aleksandar Tanev surrounded the 10,000-strong Kırcaali Detachment under the command of Mehmed Yaver Pasha. Attacked in the surrounding of the village Merhamli (Now Peplos in modern Greece), only a few of the Ottomans managed to cross the Maritsa River. The rest surrendered in the following day on 28 November.

== Development of the war until November ==
In the beginning of 1912 when the Ottoman-Montenegrin conflict from the previous month grew into Balkan-wide war the main forces of the adversaries were concentrated in Eastern Thrace and Macedonia. In the battle of Lule Burgas (28 October-2 November) the Ottoman Eastern Army was crushed by the Bulgarians and pushed to Constantinople and Gallipoli. On 9 November the Greeks captured Salonica.

The actions in the Rhodope Mountains during the first month of the war were limited. After the Bulgarians captured Kardzhali (21 October) and Smolyan (26 October) the Bulgarian troops took defensive positions. The Ottoman attempts for counter-attacks against Kardzhali and Smolyan (Battle of Alamidere) failed and the front line stabilized along the Arda River.

The main task of the Ottoman Kardzhali corps which was stationed in the Eastern Rhodopes was to prevent the Bulgarians from cutting the land communications between the Ottoman armies in Thrace and Macedonia. However, after the successes of the Balkan allies to the east and to the west, that task became pointless and after the Bulgarian High Command issued advance towards the important port of Dedeagach the situation of the corps became critical. Its commander Mehmed Yaver Pasha ordered a retreat to Galipoli with fighting in the rearguard.

== Chase of Mehmed Yaver Pasha ==
=== Actions of the Rodopi Detachment ===
After the fall of Salonica to the Balkan allies the Rodopi Detachment changed the direction of its advance. From Serres and Drama the detachment of General Stiliyan Kovachev headed eastwards and on 20 November captured Xanthi. Six days later his troops entered Dedeagach which was already taken by Macedonian volunteers.

=== Actions of the Kardzhali Detachment ===
In the battle of Balkan Toresi on 20 November the Kardzhali Detachment (3rd Brigade of the Macedonian-Adrianopolitan Volunteer Corps, two mixed regiment and other squads) defeated the Ottoman rearguard and entered Gyumyurdzhina in the next day. After several day march through the Eastern Rhodopes General Genev gave his troops a rest. On 25 November the detachment continued eastwards and after two days captured Feres in close proximity to the camp of Mehmed Yaver Pasha on the right banks of the Maritsa.

=== Actions of the Mixed Cavalry Brigade ===
On 15 November the Mixed Cavalry Brigade of Colonel Tanev captured Soflu. Reinforced with the 2nd Brigade of the Macedonian-Adrianopolitan Volunteer Corps he marched south along the Maritsa and on 18 November took Feres and on 19 November captured Dedeagach. However, concerned about the news for advancing Ottoman reinforcement, Tanev retreated back to Soflu leaving 150 volunteers in Dedeagach.

On 26 November the corps of Mehmed Yaver Pasha reached Merhamli and began to cross the Maritsa but due to the torrential rains only 1,500-2,000 men with two guns managed to reach the left bank until noon in the next day. In the meantime the troops of Tanev attacked the Ottoman forces from the north and the detachment of Genev was closing in from the west. In the evening of 27 November Tanev and Andranik who led a company of 230 Armenian volunteers forced the Ottoman commander to sign a document for capitulation. The Ottomans surrendered in the next day after the Kardzhali Detachment arrived at Merhamli. Around 9,600 Ottoman soldiers and officers were captured along with 8 artillery guns.

The survived Ottoman forces which managed to cross the Maritsa joined the Ottoman defenders in Galipoli.

== Aftermath ==
With the capitulation at Merhamli the Ottoman Empire lost Western Thrace while the Bulgarian positions in the lower current of the Maritsa and around Istanbul stabilized. With their success the Mixed Cavalry Brigade and the Kardzhali Detachment secured the rear of the 2nd Army which was besieging Adrianople and eased the supplies for 1st and 3rd Armies at Chatalja.

== Sources ==
- Balkanskata voyna 1912–1913 [The Balkan War 1912–1913] (in Bulgarian). Sofia: Darzhavno voenno izdatelstvo. 1961.
- Марков, Г. България в Балканския съюз срещу Османската империя 1912-1913 г., "Наука и изкуство", София 1989 (електронно издание „Книги за Македония“, 19.08.2009)
- Erickson, E. Defeat in Detail: The Ottoman Army in the Balkans, 1912-1913, Greenwood Publishing Group, 2003, ISBN 0-275-97888-5
