= First Balkan War order of battle =

First Balkan War order of battle includes the following orders of battle for combatants in the First Balkan War:

- First Balkan War order of battle: Bulgarian Army
- First Balkan War order of battle: Hellenic Army
- First Balkan War order of battle: Serbian Army
