= Ottoman Liberal People's Party =

Political party of the Ottoman Empire

Ottoman Liberal People's Party Ottoman Turkish: حریت‌ پرور آوام فرقه‌ سی, romanized: Hürriyetperver Avam Fırkası
- Abbreviation: OHAF
- Founder: Fethi Okyar
- Founded: 19 October 1918
- Dissolved: 6 May 1919
- Split from: Union and Progress Party
- Newspaper: Minber
- Ideology: Liberalism

Ottoman Liberal People's Party (Ottoman Turkish: حریت‌ پرور آوام فرقه‌ سی, romanized: Hürriyetperver Avam Fırkası, lit. 'Libertarian People's Party') was a political party founded during the Armistice period under the leadership of Ali Fethi Bey by state officials and politicians who resigned from the Union and Progress Party following its 1918 congress. Mustafa Kemal Pasha was one of its prominent supporters.

== Intraparty opposition ==
On September 30, 1918, the Committee of Union and Progress convened under the chairmanship of Talaat Pasha. Speaking at this meeting, Ali Fethi Bey said the following:

The Committee of Union and Progress was formed to save the Ottoman Government, which was doomed to ruin. It embarked on a historic mission. It faced many oppositions, bloody reactionaries and unimaginable betrayals. It did not hesitate to fight against misfortunes that could not be resisted. But despite all this; he did not turn away from his historical duty for a moment. Finally; this ominous war was entered. And as soon as we entered the war, many mismanagements started. Mistakes made knowingly or unknowingly by responsible and unaccountable individuals led the country and the nation into the present dire situation... Both the Society and the Party were under the influence of certain individuals. Even today, these influences continue, and the nation and the country are being dragged into the deepest abyss of disaster. This situation must come to an end immediately. Without a moment's delay, we must try to get rid of this catastrophe.

— Ali Fethi Okyar, September 30, 1918 group meeting of the Committee of Union and Progress

This speech caused the opposition within the party to rally around Ali Fethi Bey and laid the foundations of a new party.

At the October 10, 1918 parliamentary meeting, Ali Fethi Bey broke away from the party by running for the chairmanship of the Chamber of Deputies despite the party's decision on Halil Bey, and although he lost in this vote, he received 53 votes.

== Foundation ==
Liberal People's Party was founded under the leadership of Ali Fethi Bey by civil servants who left the Union and Progress Party during the government of Ahmed Izzet Pasha. There is no exact information about the date of its foundation. On October 19, 1918, it is stated that the party was established in the Parliament. Based on this, it is estimated that the party was founded a few days before. It gained the support of about 30 MPs in the Chamber of Deputies.

=== Party program ===
- On or after November 1, 1918, there was a 94-point party program published in various newspapers in Istanbul.
- While the religion of the state was defined as Islam in Article 1 of the party's program, the freedom of opinion in Article 3 was seen as a liberal step.
- From Article 50 to Article 60, the party's education policy was stated. Private educational institutions were allowed, provided that they were under the supervision of the state, and in addition, the establishment of agricultural and industrial schools was envisioned.
- The party envisaged a production-based economic program and emphasized the importance of road construction and maritime trade.

== Parliament and party activities ==
OHAF, together with the Renewal Party, took an oppositional stance against the grand vizierate of Ahmet Tevfik Pasha. Both parties were seen as the continuation of the Committee of Union and Progress.

== Dissolution ==
After the dissolution of the Committee of Union and Progress, the government of Damat Ferid Pasha, which acted against the Unionists, also dissolved the Liberal People's Party with the decision of the Council of Ministers dated May 6, 1919. Regarding the closure, it was explained that they were a renamed version of the Committee of Union and Progress and for this reason, it was decided to cancel the party's founding petition.

Although Yozgat MP Şakir Bey tried to re-establish the party in 1919, he failed to achieve results.
