= Battle of Tran =

- Part of Serbo-Bulgarian War
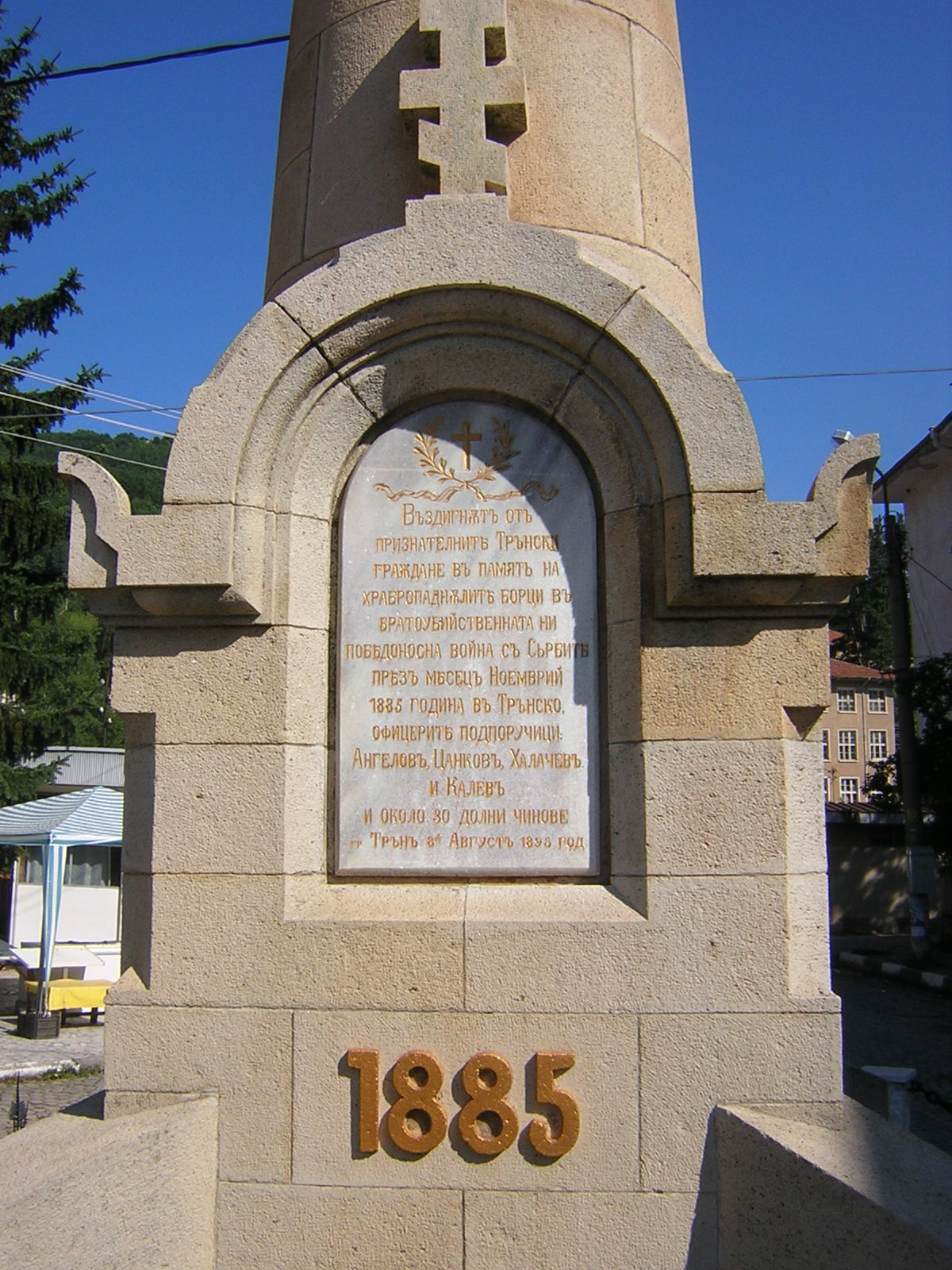
- A memorial to those killed in the battle
Date	November 3, 1885
Location	Tran, Pernik, Bulgaria
Result	Bulgarian victory

Belligerents
Serbia	Bulgaria

Commanders and leaders
Petar Topalović	Nikola Genev

Units involved
Moravian Division	Tran Detachment

Casualties and losses
9 killed, 77 wounded	4 killed, 40 wounded

The Battle of Tran or the Battle of Trun took place during the Serbo-Bulgarian War between the Moravian Division commanded by Petar Topalović and the Tran Detachment commanded by Nikola Genev.

== The Battle ==
The battle began on the morning of November 3 between the vanguard of the Moravian Division and those taken to the peaks of Golemi Rui and Mali Rui, covering the Bulgarian companies. The serious resistance of the companies led the commander of the Moravian Division to introduce the 14th Serbian Infantry Regiment into battle, and later against the village of Turokovtsi was included the 2nd Company of the 2nd Serbian Infantry Regiment.

The Serbs, with considerable numerical superiority, resumed the offensive. The 2nd and 4th companies of the 3rd Bdina Regiment opposed the pressure on the northern flank. However, the Serbs reached the trenches and went into hand-to-hand combat. The officers personally lead their soldiers. Platoon commander Georgi Tonev, gave the command "Forward!", "Hurray!", And the whole platoon followed the example of their commander. This resulted in massive damage was inflicted on the Serbian front lines and the offensive was stopped.

The Moravian Division retreated to the peak of Golemi Rui, and its artillery occupied firing positions in the area of the villages of Zabel and Turokovtsi.

In the evening at 11 pm, the commander of the Tran detachment, Nikola Genev, received an order, due to the retreat of the Serbian positions near Vrabcha and the detachment also began to retreat to the Trun-Breznik road as Milan I offered to begin peace negotiations.

== Bibliography ==
- Съединението 1885 - енциклопедичен справочник. Sofia: Държавно издателство „д-р Петър Берон“. 1985.
- Христов, Х. и др., Сръбско-българската война 1885. Сборник документи, Sofia, 1985, Военно издателство
