= Aleksandar Tanev =

Bulgarian general

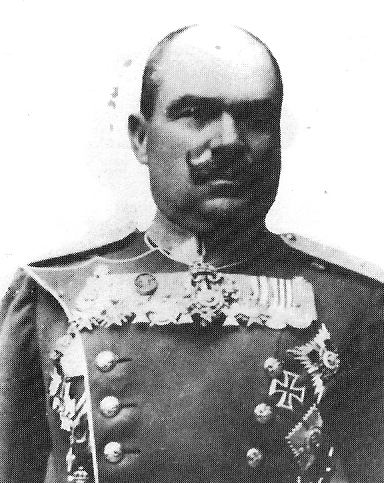
- Born: August 1, 1863; Veles, Kosovo Vilayet, Ottoman Empire
- Died: August 16, 1932 (aged 69); Sofia, Sofia City Province, Bulgaria
- Military career
- Allegiance: Principality of Bulgaria; Kingdom of Bulgaria
- Branch: Bulgarian Land Forces
- Service years: 1880 – 1918
- Conflicts: Serbo-Bulgarian War; First Balkan War; Bulgarian front; Battle of Merhamli; Second Balkan War; World War I

Alexander Andreev Tanev (September 1, 1863 – August 16, 1932) was a 20th-century Bulgarian Army officer, lieutenant general of the cavalry, inspector of the cavalry from 1913 to 1915, commander of the cavalry division from October to November 1915 and was commander of the 1st divisional district until 1916.

== Biography ==
Alexander Tanev was born in Veles, then in the Ottoman Empire. On October 17, 1880, he enlisted in the Bulgarian Land Forces. In 1883 he graduated from the fourth class of the Vasil Levski National Military University in Sofia. On August 30, 1883, he was promoted to the rank of lieutenant and enlisted in the Life Guards Squadron . During the Serbo-Bulgarian War in 1885 he was the commander of a standard platoon of the squadron and respectively an ordinary of Prince Alexander Battenberg, but later joined his squadron on the battlefield and took part in the battles at Slivnitsa, Tsaribrod and Pirot.

On March 24, 1886, Tanev was promoted to the rank of lieutenant, and two years later in 1888, to the rank of captain. He studied law at the Faculty of Law of the University of Heidelberg and graduated successfully in 1889. He then specialized in law in Aix-en-Provence until 1891. He returned to Bulgaria and enlisted in the Military Guard Squadron. On February 25, 1900, he was promoted to the rank of lieutenant colonel. He served as a prosecutor and chairman of the Plovdiv Military Court (1901 - 1902), then became commander of the 1st Cavalry Division. On September 24, 1904, he was promoted to colonel. From 1903 to 1907 he commanded the 3rd Cavalry Regiment, later in 1909 the 3rd Cavalry Brigade.

=== Balkan Wars ===
From 1909 to 1912 Tanev was commander of the 2nd Cavalry Brigade which, as part of the Kardzhali squad, took part in the First Balkan War. The brigade formed the Combined Cavalry Brigade, commanded by Colonel Tanev, and fought along the Maritsa Valley from Dimotika to Alexandroupoli. On November 14, 1912, the troops of Colonel Alexander Tanev which were the Cavalry Brigade and the 2nd Macedonian-Edirne Brigade, took up positions near the village of Teke and after two hours of artillery fire forced Mehmed Yaver Pasha to seek a truce. He personally led the negotiations for capitulation. On the evening of November 14, the Turkish Pasha and Colonel Tanev signed the document of capitulation. This took place at the mentioned Bulgarian Aegean village of Teke.

The next day on November 15, 1912, Mehmed Yaver Pasha and the Turkish Kardzhali Corps under his command officially surrendered to the Chief of the Bulgarian Kardzhali Detachment and General Genev, commander of the Macedonian-Adrianopolitan Volunteer Corps.

During the Second Balkan War, Tanev was commander of the Bosilegrad detachment, which connected the 1st and 2nd armies. From 1913 to 1915 he was an inspector of the cavalry. In 1914 he was promoted to major general.

=== World War I ===
In the First World War in October and November 1915 he commanded the Cavalry Division and fought with it at his native Veles, Prilep and Bitola. He later became head of the 1st Sofia divisional area (1915-1916) and Drama voennoinspektsionna area (1918).

After the end of the war he went to the reserves and practiced private law.

== Bibliography ==
- Milen Kumanov. Macedonia. A Short Historical Handbook, Sofia, 1993.
- Col. P. Darvingov, "History of the MACEDONIAN-ODRINO MILITARY, Volume One", p.312
- Major Kozhuharov, "Our Cavalry", 1936, books 9 and 10, "The Battle of Merhamlѫ-Teke (the capture of Yaver Pasha)", with .24
- Military History Commission, "The War between BULGARIA and TURKEY 1912 - 1913, Volume V, Book One", p. 606
