= Petar Darvingov =

Bulgarian officer, revolutionary and military historian

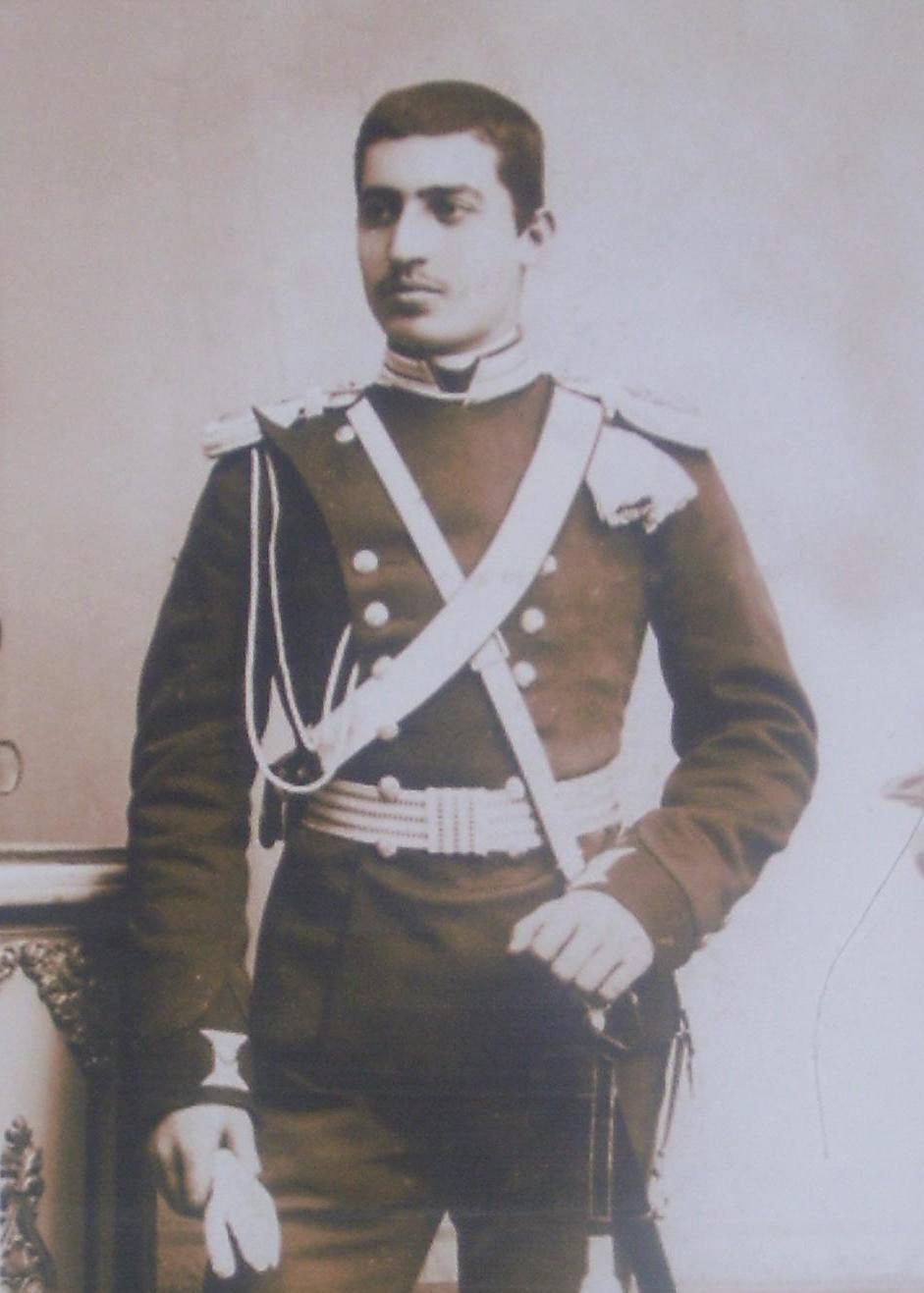
- Born: 23 May 1875; Kilkis, Ottoman Empire
- Died: 8 March 1958 (aged 82); Sofia, Bulgaria

Petar Georgiev Darvingov (Bulgarian: Петър Георгиев Дървингов) was a Bulgarian officer, revolutionary and military historian, corresponding member of Bulgarian Academy of Sciences from 1932.

== Biography ==
Darvingov was born in Kilkis, then Ottoman Empire (now Greece), in 1875. He graduated Bulgarian Men's High School in Solun (Thessaloniki) in 1892. He continued his education in the Military School in Sofia, graduated it in 1896 with honors and was promoted to the rank of lieutenant. In 1900 Darvingov was promoted to the rank first lieutenant.

Darvingov joined Supreme Macedonian-Adrianople Revolutionary Committee and in 1902, during the uprising in the region of Gorna Dzumaya headed a military detachment. During the Ilinden uprising in 1903 Darvingov was a military organizer of the bands of IMORO. As voivode of the revolutionary district of Seres he fought in the region of Melnik.

After the uprising Darvingov returned to Bulgaria and do a real service in the Bulgarian Army. In 1906 he was promoted in rank of (captain). In 1909 he graduated military academy in Turin, Italy. On 18 May 1911 Darvingov was promoted to the rank of major and appointed assistant chief of the Intelligence Department in the headquarters of the Bulgarian Army. Darvingov took part in the First Balkan War, as with the Order №5 of 25 September 1912, issued by the head of the headquarters of the army Major General Ivan Fichev, Darvingov was appointed chief of staff of Macedonian-Adrianopolitan Volunteer Corps. On 18 May 1915 Darvingov was promoted to the rank lieutenant colonel.

During the First World War (1915-1918), Darvingov was an organizer and, in 1916, chief of staff of Eleventh Macedonian infantry division, completed by Bulgarians from Macedonia. In May 1916 Darvingov as colonel was appointed commander of the 1st Regiment of the 11th Macedonian division. One year later he received the appointment of chief of staff of Moravian military region, which position remained to 1918. On 15 August 1917 he was promoted to the rank of colonel.

On 4 November 1918 Darvingov was transferred to the reserve and was engaged in scientific and public activity. His research interests were related to military history. Darvingov's book "History of the Macedonian-Adrianopolitan Volunteer Corp" (1919) is one of the first studies on a single Bulgarian military unit and still is regarded as the best work dedicated to the corps.

Darvingov was honorary president of the Association of Macedonian-Adrianopolitan volunteers, as well as president of the Society of the Bulgarian publicists and the Bulgarian Association of military writers.

== Works ==
- From Plovdiv and Sofia to Tsarigrad and Skopje (1903)
- Pirin and the fight on its soil "(1904)
- Military Bulgaria. Sociological study of the Bulgarian reality "(1911)
- History of the Macedonian-Adrianopolitan Volunteer Corp (Volume 1, 1919, Volume 2, 1925)
- The actions of the Eleventh Macedonian infantry division from Krivolak Bogdantsi to 1915" (1920)
- Attack of Edirne: under the light of history and art - historical and psychological analysis" (1931)
- The spirit of the Bulgarian history" (1932)
- Collection "Solun" (Thessaloniki), 1934 (coauthor with Professor Vladislav Aleksiev)
- The influence of sea power on the history of Bulgaria (1935)
- Balkan war - as was seen when the events developed (1941)
- ABC in 1895 from self or the elderly
- Evlija Chelebi and Western Bulgarian lands (1943)
- Selected Works (1988)
