= Macedonian-Adrianopolitan Volunteer Corps =

- Македоно-одринско опълчение
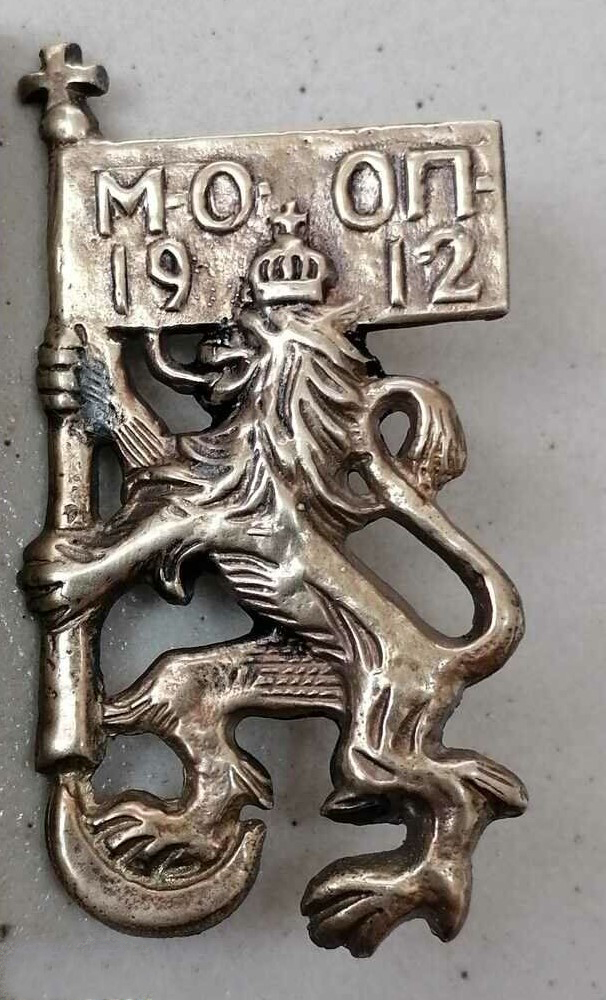
- The cockade of the Macedonian-Adrianopolitan Volunteer Corps
- Active: 23 September 1912 – 1 October 1913
- Country: Kingdom of Bulgaria
- Branch: Bulgarian Army
- Type: Infantry
- Size: 14,670 (1912); 26,638 (1913)
- Engagements: Balkan Wars; First Balkan War; Battle of Merhamli; Battle of Bulair; Battle of Şarköy; Second Balkan War; Battle of Kalimanci

Commanders
- Commander: Nikola Genev
- Asst. Commander: Aleksandar Protogerov
- Chief of Staff: Petar Darvingov
- 2nd Company: Garegin Nzhdeh; Andranik Ozanian

The Macedonian-Adrianopolitan Volunteer Corps (Bulgarian: Македоно-одринско опълчение, romanized: Makedono-odrinsko opalchenie, Macedonian: Македонско-одрински доброволни чети, romanized: Makedonsko-Odrinski dobrovolni četi; MAVC) was a volunteer corps of the Bulgarian Army during the Balkan Wars. It was formed on 23 September 1912 and consisted of Bulgarian volunteers from Macedonia and Thrace, regions still under Ottoman rule, and thus not subject to Bulgarian military service. Foreign volunteers were also part of the corps.

== Formation and composition ==
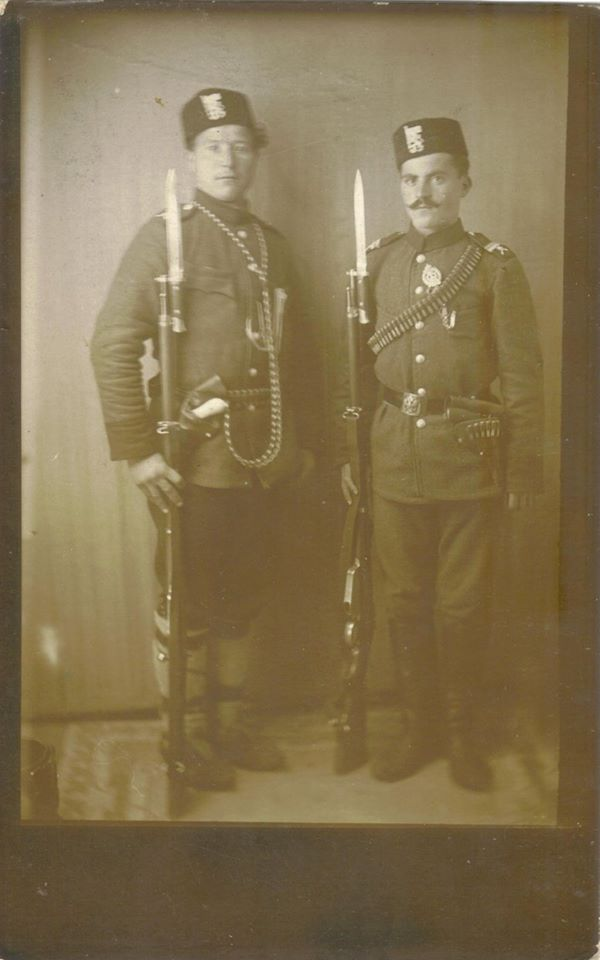
Soldiers of the MAVC

The Macedonian-Adrianopolitan Volunteer Corps was founded on 23 September 1912, just 6 days after the general mobilization was declared. The corps was open to anyone who had not yet completed military service in Bulgaria and was also open to foreign volunteers. Those who joined the corps were to remain in service for as long as the war lasted unless discharged by their superiors. Total personnel at the beginning of the conflicts numbered 14,670, with Bulgarians numbered at 14,139. Foreign volunteers included 275 Armenians, 82 Russians, 68 Romanians, 40 Serbs, 15 Austro-Hungarians, 12 Montenegrins, 3 Greeks, 2 Czechs, 1 Albanian, 1 Englishman, 1 Italian, 1 Persian and 1 Croat. By the end of the Balkan Wars it had 26,638 men and 947 officers. Many komitadjis of the Internal Macedonian Revolutionary Organization who had been active during the Macedonian Struggle had volunteered for service in the corps.

The Commander of the Corps was Major General Nikola Genev, the Assistant Commander Colonel Aleksandar Protogerov, and the Chief of Staff was Major Petar Darvingov. Armenian volunteers were organized into the 2nd Company, led by Lieutenant Garegin Nzhdeh and Andranik Ozanian (from the 12th Lozengrad Battalion).

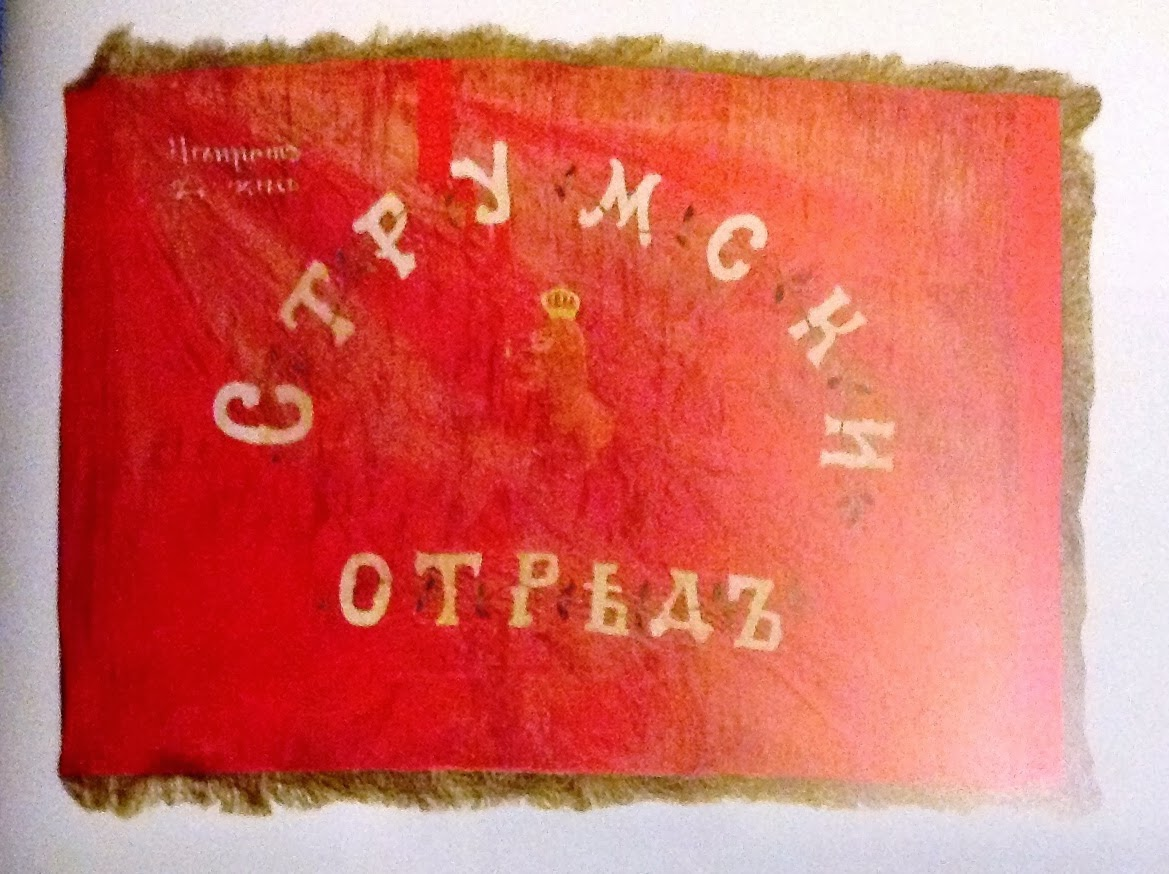
Flag of the Armenian 2nd Company

The corps was entirely supplied by the Bulgarian Army with most of the volunteers being issued Berdan rifles. The corps had brown uniforms, but a uniform shortage led to moments where many of the volunteers wore civilian clothing instead.

== Balkan Wars and casualties ==
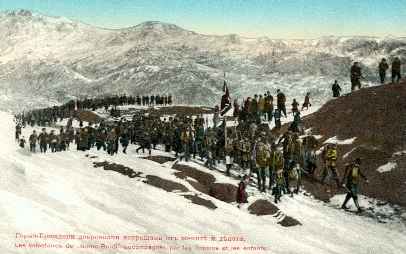
Bulgarian volunteers from the Macedonian-Adrianopolitan Volunteer Corps leaving Gorno Brodi (today Ano Vrontou, Greece)

During the First Balkan War, the Macedonian-Adrianopolitan Volunteer Corps engaged the Ottoman Turks including the successful battles of Merhamli, Bulair, and Şarköy. According to the Carnegie report on the Balkan Wars, the Bulgarian authorities deliberately relocated Macedonian volunteers to the Thracian front to prevent a genuine liberation of Macedonia by Macedonians themselves. The Macedonian legionaries began accusing the Bulgarian government of deceiving the people in order to "sell Macedonia". During the less successful Second Balkan War, it saw action against the Serbs, including in the Battle of Kalimanci. The corps was disbanded on 1 October 1913, some months after the end of the conflict.

In total, 781 volunteers were killed in action, 135 died outside of combat, 901 were wounded in action, 32 were taken as prisoners of war, while 110 were missing in action.

== Notable volunteers ==
- Todor Aleksandrov
- Vasil Chekalarov
- Ivan Hadzhinikolov
- Gyorche Petrov

== Honours ==
Opalchenie Peak in Vinson Massif, Antarctica, is named after the Bulgarian Volunteer Force in the 1877-1878 Russo-Turkish War and the Macedonian-Adrianople Volunteer Force in the 1912-1913 Balkan Wars.

== Sources ==
- Darvingov, Petar. History of the Macedonian-Adrianopolitan Volunteer Corp (Volume 1, 1919, Volume 2, 1925) (Bulgarian)
