= Bolayır =

- Village
- Location within Turkey Location within Marmara
- Coordinates: 40°31′N 26°45′E
- Country: Turkey
- Province: Çanakkale
- District: Gelibolu
- Population (2021): 1,053
- Time zone: UTC+3 (TRT)
- Postal code: 17500
- Area code: 0286

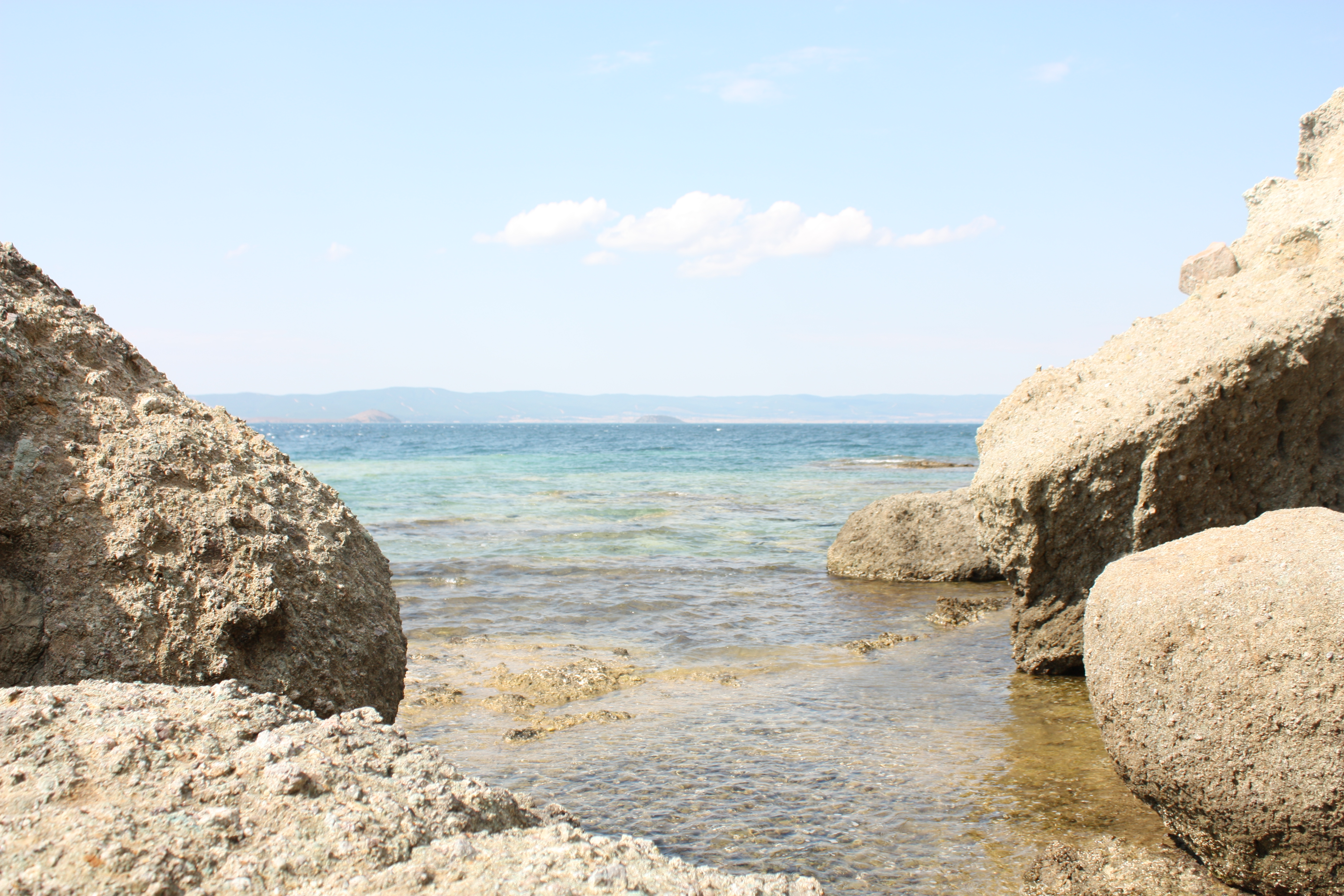
Bakla Point, Bolayir, Gelıbolu, Çanakkale

Bolayır is a village in the Gelibolu District of Çanakkale Province, situated on the Gallipoli Peninsula in the European part of Turkey. Its population is 1,053 (2021).

Between 1958 and the 2013 reorganisation, it was a town (belde).

The türbe (tomb) of Suleyman Pasha (1316–1357), son of Orhan, the second Bey of the Ottoman Beylik and the grave of the Turkish nationalist poet Namık Kemal (1840–1888) are located in Bolayır. On 26 January 1913, Bolayır was the site of the Battle of Bulair, a major Bulgarian victory over the Ottomans during the First Balkan War.

Bolayır was also the site of the Gallipoli Campaign (1915–1916) during World War I.

The traditional Greek name of Bolayır is Πλαγιάρι (Plagiari) and in Bulgarian the town is known as Булаир (Bulair). It may be the same settlement known as Branchialion in medieval times or, if not, very close to it. A village in Dolni Chiflik Municipality, Varna Province bears the name Bulair in honour of the Bulgarian victory at Bolayır and a Bulgarian military march, the Bulair March, was written to commemorate the battle.

The ruins of the Ancient Greek city of Lysimachia lie nearby.
