= Battle of Bulair =

Battle in the Balkan Wars

- Part of the Bulgarian front of the First Balkan War
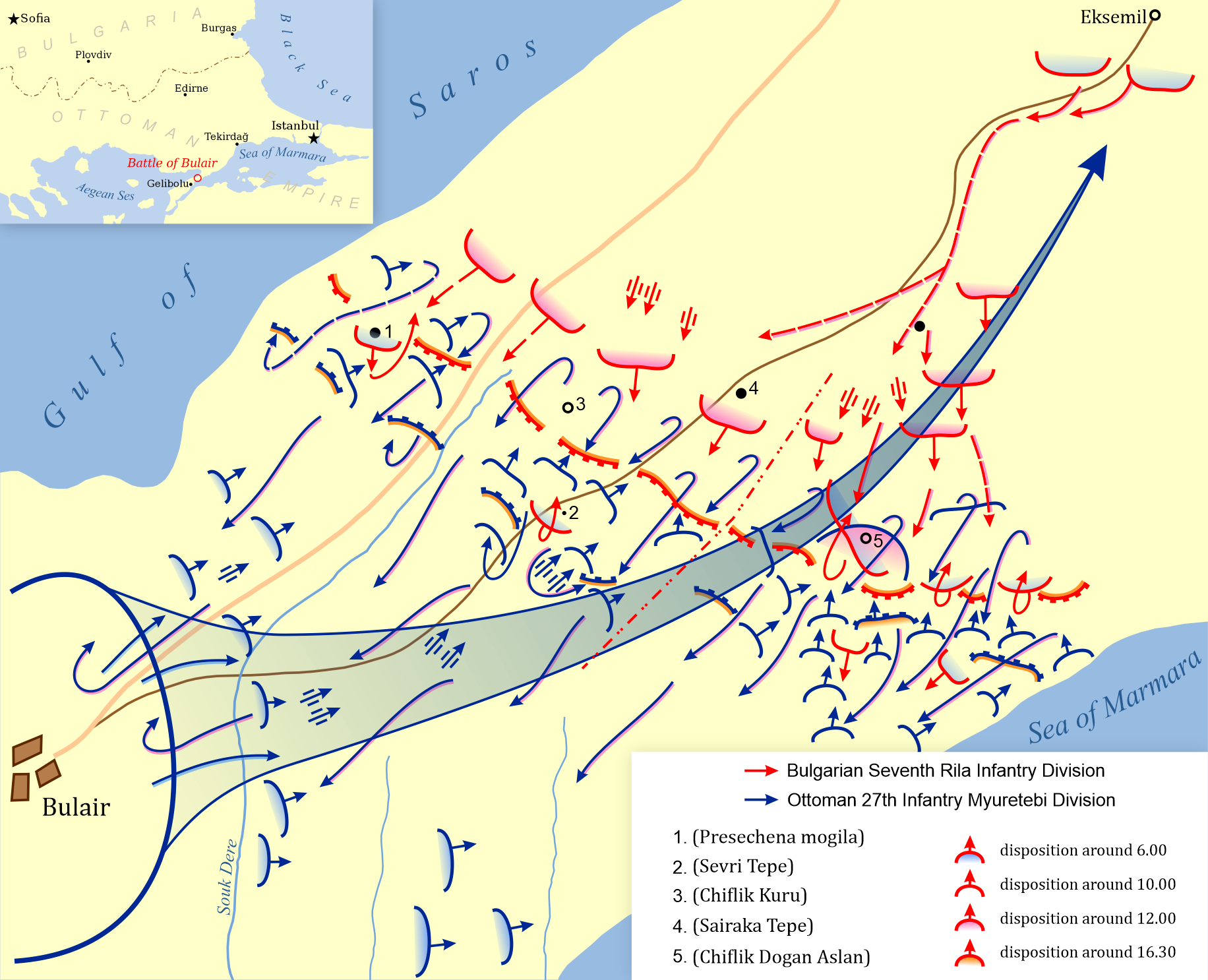
- Battle of Bulair map
Date	8 February 1913
Location	Bulair, Gelibolu District, Adrianople Vilayet, Ottoman Empire, (Bolayır, Turkey) 40.5263°N 26.7948°E
Result	Bulgarian victory

Belligerents
Tsardom of Bulgaria	Ottoman Empire

Commanders and leaders
(Bulgaria) Stiliyan Kovachev (Bulgaria) Georgi Todorov	Enver Pasha; Mustafa Kemal Pasha; Ali Fethi Pasha

Strength
10,000 men 13 companies 3 squadrons 24 machine guns 36 guns	37,355 men 21 camps 1 squadron 12 warships 78 guns

Casualties and losses
530 casualties; 114 killed; 416 wounded	16,000 casualties; 6,000 killed; 10,000 wounded

The Battle of Bulair (Bulgarian: Битка при Була ир, Turkish: Bolayır Muharebesi) took place on 8 February 1913 (O.S. 26 January 1913) between the Bulgarian Seventh Rila Infantry Division under General Georgi Todorov and the Ottoman 27th Infantry Division. The result was a Bulgarian victory. Lack of communication between the Ottoman Vanguard and their landing force and stubbornness of Enver Pasha against the combined criticism from officers Ali Fethi and Mustafa Kemal against his plans costed the Ottoman 27th Brigade their full offensive capabilities. As a result, Ottoman Army could not conduct any further large-scale offensives to relieve the Siege of Edirne.

== Prelude ==
The city of Edirne came under joint siege of Bulgarians and Serbians from the beginning of the war in 1912. Enver Pasha wanted to relieve the city by launching an offensive to hit the besieging forces from the rear.

Enver's plan consisted of combined naval and land assault towards the 7th Rila Regiment which occupied northern parts of the Gallipoli Peninsula. Elements of the 27th would engage the Bulgarian lines around Bulair while more units would land around Saor Bay and flank the 7th, effectively forming an encirclement.

The plan was revealed to the general staff of the 27th aboard one of the ships and immediately came under heavy criticism by Mustafa Kemal, who believed the delay in the offensive to be a strategic mistake as the landings would take a few days to prepare and initiate. Kemal offered to attack the unorganised Bulgarians in a night raid while they lacked any defensive cohesion. Despite this, Enver ordered the plan to be set in motion. Landing operations took 2 days to prepare, which gave Bulgarians valuable time to prepare defensive positions and to also bring in the 13th Regiment alongside their auxiliary artillery.

== The Battle ==
The advance began on the morning of 8 February (O.S. 26 January) when the Ottoman Auxiliary Platoons made up of Irregular Reservists of the 27th Division headed from Saor Bay towards the road to Bulair. At 7 a.m. Bulgarian 13th Regiment uncovered the Ottoman attack and fired accurate volleys in addition to artillery fire. The Ottoman artillery simultaneously opened fire as well with little effectiveness due to the thick fog that formed. Some elements of Bulgarian Artillery repositioned on the hills overlooking Saor Bay from where they later fired shots on Doganarslan Chiflik.

The Ottomans captured the position at the Doganarslan Chiflik after routing the outnumbered Bulgarians there and began to surround the left wing of the 22nd Infantry Regiment. The Bulgarians made a counter-attack from the flank, which forced the Irregulars to pull back in a full rout.

Bulgarian soldiers at the Battle of Bulair

The Bulgarian artillery now concentrated its fire on Doganarslan Chiflik. Around 3 p.m. 22nd Regiment counter-attacked the right wing of the Ottoman forces and after a short but fierce fight the Ottoman troops began to retreat disorderly. The Bulgarian center briefly regrouped and then struck the Ottoman left wing which broke without much resistance.

Around 5 p.m. regulars Ottoman units regrouped and attacked the Bulgarian center but were repulsed before reaching the lines.

Mustafa Kemal Pasha re-organised the forces and maintained an orderly retreat to establish defensive positions half a kilometre south. Bulgarians established a defensive line of their own around Tzympe Castle. No further attacks would follow.

== Sources ==
- Peychev, A. (1984). 1300 godini na strazha [1300 Years on Guard] (in Bulgarian). Sofia: Voenno izdatelstvo.
- Markov, Georgi (2012). Balgariya v Balkanskiya sayuz sreshtu Osmanskata imperiya, 1911–1913 [Bulgaria in the Balkan League against the Ottoman Empire, 1911–1913] (in Bulgarian). Sofia: Zahariy Stoyanov. ISBN 978-954-09-0725-3.
- Zafirov, Dimitar; Aleksandrov, Emil (2007). Istoriya na Balgarite: Voenna istoriya [History of the Bulgarians: Military History] (in Bulgarian). Sofia: Trud. ISBN 954-528-752-7.
- Kosev, K. (1983). Podvigat [The Feat] (in Bulgarian). Sofia: Voenno izdatelstvo.
