= Stiliyan Kovachev =

Bulgarian general (1860–1939)

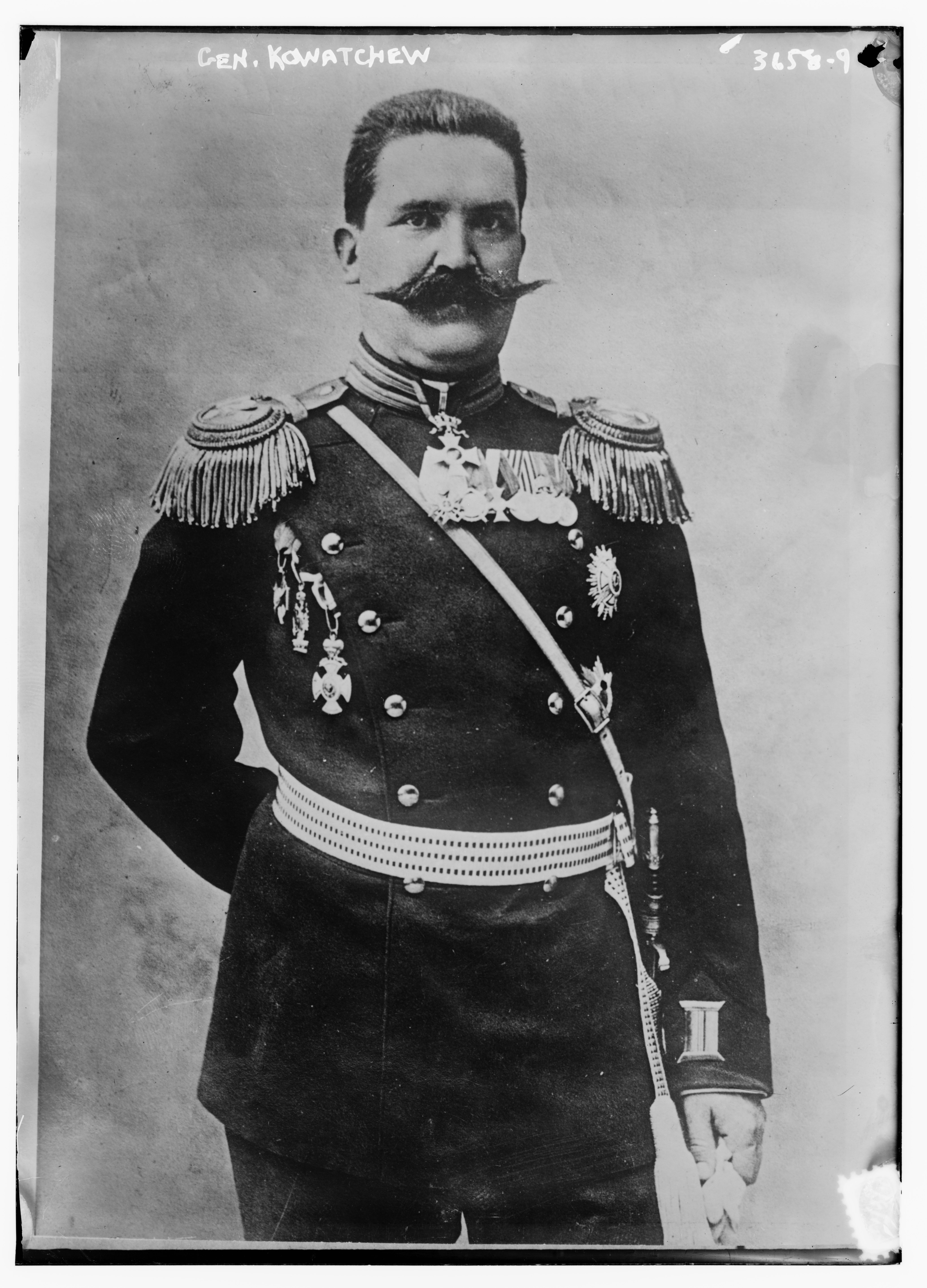
- Born: 26 February 1860; Yanbolu, Ottoman Empire (now Yambol, Bulgaria)
- Died: 11 July 1939 (aged 79); Sofia, Bulgaria
- Children: Dimitrina Kovachev
- Military career
- Allegiance: Bulgaria
- Branch: Bulgarian Army
- Service years: 1879–1918
- Rank: General
- Commands: 4th Preslav Infantry Division (1905 – 1909); 2nd Thracian Infantry Division (1909 – 1912); 4th Army
- Conflicts: Serbo-Bulgarian War; First Balkan War; Bulgarian front; Second Balkan War; First World War
- Awards: See below

Stiliyan Kovachev (Bulgarian: Стилиян Ковачев; 26 February 1860 in Yanbolu (Yambol) – 11 July 1939 in Sofia) was a Bulgarian general. During the First Balkan War he commanded the Rodopi Detachment and later 4th Army. He was a Minister of Defense for short time in the beginning of the Second Balkan War in the government of Stoyan Danev (1913).

== Biography ==
Stiliyan Kovachev was born on 26 February in Yanbolu (Yambol), then under Ottoman rule. He received his elementary education in Yanbolu and in İslimiye (Sliven). Since early age he entered the Yambol Revolutionary Committee where he assisted Dimitar Drazhev helping for the correspondence of the committee. When the April Uprising broke out the cheta of Drazhev joined the squad of Ilarion Dragostinov and Stoil Voyvoda. During battle to the north of Sliven, Georgi Drazhev was captured by the Turks and hanged on 29 June 1876, but Kovachev managed to escape the gallows.

After the Liberation of Bulgaria the 18-year-old Kovachev continued his education in Plovdiv. In November 1878 he moved to Sofia and entered the newly established military school. He graduated the following year and on 10 May was promoted to lieutenant and was appointed as a commander of a platoon in the 2nd company of the training forces of the Eastern Rumelia militia.

On 9 July he was promoted to first lieutenant. Between 1882 and 1883 he studied in the Military Engineering Academy in Saint Petersburg but fell ill and had to return to Bulgaria. On 7 March 1884 he was promoted to captain, and in the spring of 1885 his company was sent to the Rhodope Mountains to the south of Pazardzhik to protect the Bulgarian population from Turk and Greek bands.

=== Serbo-Bulgarian War ===
During the Serbo-Bulgarian War in 1885 his company was transferred from the south-eastern border and took part in the battle of Slivnitsa. Kovachev participated in the advanced guard of the army during the advance to Tsaribrod (11 November) and Pirot (14–15 November). For his achievements during the war he was awarded Order "For Bravery" IV Grade.

After the war he became chief of the chancellery of the Military Ministry (1886–1894). On 13 August 1886 he was promoted to major and on 1 January 1892 to lieutenant colonel. Between 1894 and 1905 he was in command of the 9th infantry regiment, 12th infantry regiment, 5th infantry brigade and 2nd infantry division. On 1 January 1896 he was promoted to colonel and in 1905 to major general. Between 1905 and 1909 he commanded the 4th Preslav Infantry Division and then 2nd Thracian Infantry Division up to 1912. From September 1912 he commanded the Rodopi Detachment.

=== Balkan Wars ===
In the beginning of the First Balkan War he was in command of the 2nd infantry division and the Rodopi Detachment which advanced in the secondary direction from Plovdiv to Western Thrace. After the success in that operation he was put in charge of the 4th Army which defeated the Ottomans in the battle of Bulair and in the battle of Şarköy.

On 14 July 1913 General Kovachev was appointed Minister of Defense in the new government of Stoyan Danev but due to the tense situation he remained in the front lines. Due to his disapproval of the action of Tsar Ferdinand and the beginning of the Second Balkan War he was removed from office and from command of the 4th Army and on 27 August 1913 went to the reserve.

=== First World War ===
After Bulgaria entered the First World War in 1915, Stiliyan Kovachev was mobilized in the headquarters of the 2nd divisional region and from 1916 he became head of the Main Rear Command of the army. On 15 August 1917 he was promoted to lieutenant general. After the war he resigned from the army. On 6 May 1936 he was promoted to General of the Infantry.

General Stiliyan Kovachev died in Sofia on 11 July 1939.

== Bibliography ==
- Kovachev, Stiliyan (1894). Manual for hand weapons
- Kovachev, Stiliyan (1894). Manual for field fortifications
- Kovachev, Stiliyan (1920–1926). Military notices
- Kovachev, Stiliyan (1921). Memorial pioneer booklet
- Kovachev, Stiliyan (1921–1927). Construction art

== Awards ==
- Order of Bravery 3rd class, 4th class
- Great Cross of the Order of St Alexander 2nd class with swords, 1st class without swords
- Order of Military Merit 2nd class
- Order of Stara Planina, 1st grade with swords - awarded posthumously on 20 December 2012
- Russian Order of St. Anna 2nd class
- Austro-Hungarian Order of the Iron Crown 2nd class
- Montenegrin Order of Prince Danilo I 2nd class
- Romanian Order of the Gold Star 2nd class

== Sources ==
- Rangelov, L. (1985). Hrabri idat tvoite kapitani [Brave, Your Captains Are Coming] (in Bulgarian). Sofia: Voenno izdatelstvo.
- Nedev, S. (1993). Komandvaneto na balgarskata voyska prez voynite za natsionalno obedinenie [The Command of the Bulgarian Army During the Wars for National Unification] (in Bulgarian). Sofia: Voennoizdatelski kompleks "Sv. Georgi Pobedonosets".
- Dimitrov, I. (1985). Saedinenieto 1885 - entsiklopedichen spravochnik [The Unification of 1885 - Encyclopedic Reference Book] (in Bulgarian). Sofia: Darzhavno izdatelstvo "Dr. Petar Beron".

Political offices
Preceded by Nikofor Nikoforov	Minister of War of Bulgaria; 14 June 1913 – 11 July 1913	Succeeded by Georgi Vazov
