= Georgi Todorov (general) =

Bulgarian General

Georgi Stoyanov Todorov
- Born: 10 August 1858; Bolgrad, Principality of Moldavia
- Died: 16 November 1934 (aged 76); Sofia, Bulgaria
- Military career
- Allegiance: Tsardom of Bulgaria
- Branch: Bulgarian Army
- Service years: 1877–1919
- Rank: General
- Commands: Seventh Rila Infantry Division; Second Bulgarian Army; Third Bulgarian Army; Commander-in-chief
- Conflicts: Russo-Turkish War; Serbo-Bulgarian War; First Balkan War; Bulgarian front; Battle of Bulair; Second Balkan War; Battle of Bulair; Battle of Kalimantsi; First World War; Battle of Ovche Pole; Battle of Dobro Pole; Vardar Offensive
- Awards

Georgi Stoyanov Todorov (Bulgarian: Георги Тодоров) (born on 10 August 1858 in Bolgrad; died on 16 November 1934 in Sofia) was a Bulgarian general who fought in the Russo-Turkish War (1877–1878), Serbo-Bulgarian War (1885), Balkan Wars (1912–1913) and First World War (1914–1918).

== Biography ==
At the age of 19, he volunteered in the Bulgarian Corps (Opalchentsi) during the Russo-Turkish Liberation War. After the liberation, he graduated the first course of the Military School in Sofia (1879). In 1882, he entered the Sankt Peterburg Academy but could not graduate it because he returned for the Unification of Bulgaria in 1885 and took part in the war that followed immediately after it. During the war against Serbia, he commanded a unit which fought successfully against the enemy in the area of Vidin and Kula.

After the war, he participated in the dethroning of Alexander I and was dismissed from the Army in 1886. Only a year later, he returned to office. On 13 August 1887, he was promoted to major. On 1 January 1896, Todorov became a colonel. He served in the Military School and as a chief of the Sevlievo garrison. On 1 January 1910 he was promoted major general and a commander of the Seventh Rila Infantry Division.

=== Balkan Wars ===
During the First Balkan War (1912–1913) as a commander of the Seventh Rila Infantry Division, he advanced towards Solun and on 26 January 1913 he defeated the Ottomans in the Battle of Bulair.

During the Second Balkan War (1913), he and his division participated in the Battle of Kalimantsi where the Serbs were defeated.

=== First World War ===
After the accession of Bulgaria in the First World War, he commanded the 2nd Army. He led the operations in Macedonia which ended with the defeat of the Serbs in the Battle of Ovche Pole. With that success, the Bulgarians did not allow the meeting of the Serbian Army and the Anglo-French forces who embarked in Solun. In February 1917, he was in command of the 3rd Army and defeated the Romanians in Dobrudzha. From 8 September 1918, he became commander-in-chief of the Bulgarian Army after the illness of General Nikola Zhekov. He participated in the Battle of Dobro Pole, which was the crucial Serbian victory in 1918. He was dismissed in 1919.

General Georgi Todorov died on 16 November 1934 in Sofia.

== Honours and awards ==
- Kingdom of Bulgaria: Order of Bravery, 2nd, 3rd and 4th classes
- Kingdom of Bulgaria: Order of St Alexander, 1st class with Swords, 4th and 5th classes without swords
- Kingdom of Bulgaria: Order of Military Merit, 1st class
- Republic of Bulgaria: Order of Stara Planina, 1st grade with swords - awarded posthumously on 20 December 2012
- German Empire: Pour le Mérite
- German Empire: Iron Cross, 1st and 2nd classes
- Ottoman Empire: Liakat Medal
