= Nikola Genev =

Bulgarian volunteer, officer, lieutenant general and commander

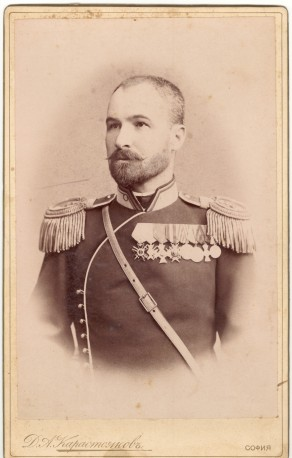
- Born: 18 January 1856; Sevlievo, Silistra Eyalet, Ottoman Empire
- Died: 12 April 1934 (aged 78); Sofia, Sofia City Province, Bulgaria
- Military career
- Allegiance: Principality of Bulgaria; Kingdom of Bulgaria
- Branch: Bulgarian Volunteer Corps; Bulgarian Land Forces
- Service years: 1877 – 1915
- Rank: Lieutenant General
- Conflicts: Russo-Turkish War (1877-1878); Battle of Shipka Pass; Serbo-Bulgarian War; First Balkan War; Battle of Merhamli; Second Balkan War

Nikola Genev Kolchev was a Bulgarian volunteer, officer, a lieutenant general, and a commander of the Macedonian-Adrianopolitan Volunteer Corps during the First Balkan War and the Second Balkan War.

== Biography ==
Nikola Genev was born to a Bulgarian family on 18 January 1856 in Sevlievo and Ottoman Empire. He took part in the April Uprising of 1876 as a member of the revolutionary committee in his hometown. He was arrested and tortured by the Turks, and later managed to emigrate to Romania, after which he moved to Russia.

=== Russo-Turkish War (1877-1878) ===
During the preparation of the Russo-Turkish War (1877-1878) he enlisted in the Bulgarian Volunteer Corps as a Volunteer from the III Volunteer Company. He took part in the Battle of Shipka Pass. For his personal bravery he was awarded the military Order of St. George, IV degree. At the end of the war he was promoted to the rank of junior non-commissioned officer.

After the Liberation he entered the Military School in Sofia. He graduated from the first class in 1879. On 10 May he was promoted to the rank of lieutenant . At his own request he was assigned to the III Radomir Infantry Company (inherited the III Company from the Bulgarian Volley). In 1883 he graduated from the Rifle Officer School in St. Petersburg .

=== Serbo-Bulgarian War ===
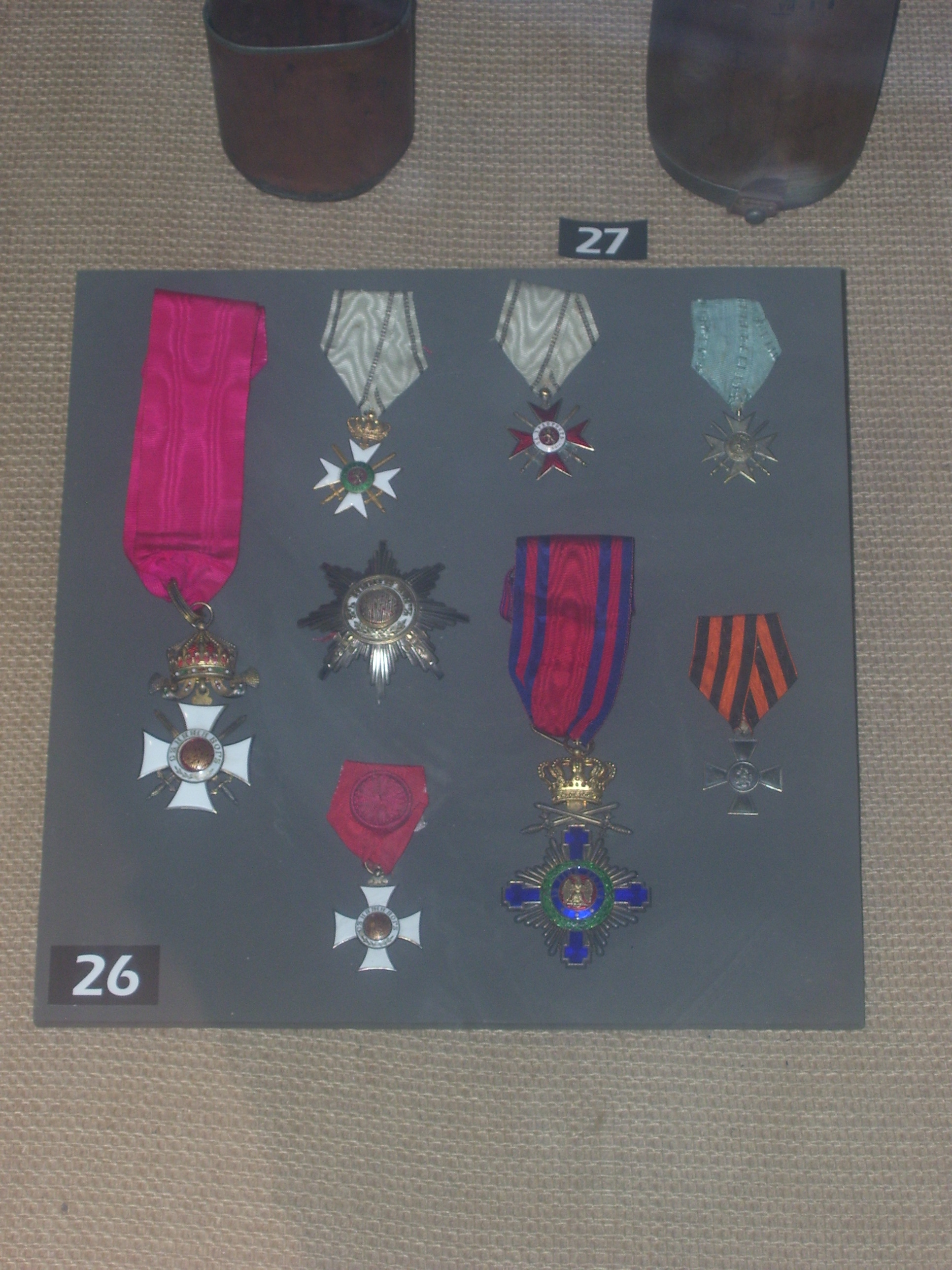
Nikola Genev's crosses and awards in the National Museum of Military History

During the Serbo-Bulgarian War, Captain Genev was commander of the III Company of the II Struma Infantry Regiment from 27 September 1885, as well as commander of the Trun detachment. Despite its small composition, it was given the task of slowing down the Moravian Division, which was moving towards the Slivnitsa position. The detachment gained valuable time needed to further strengthen and replenish the army's fighting force. For his participation in the war he was awarded the Order of Bravery, IV st.

From 13 August 1887 he was a senior officer with the rank of major, and in 1892 he was promoted to the rank of lieutenant colonel. From 1893 to 1900 Nikola Genev was successively commander of the II Infantry Regiment, the XIX Shumen Infantry Regiment and the VII Preslav Infantry Regiment. From 1900 to 1904 he was commander of the 1st Brigade in the VI Bdina Infantry Division. On 4 March 1904 he was promoted to the rank of Major General. He voluntarily went to the reserves.

=== The Balkan Wars ===
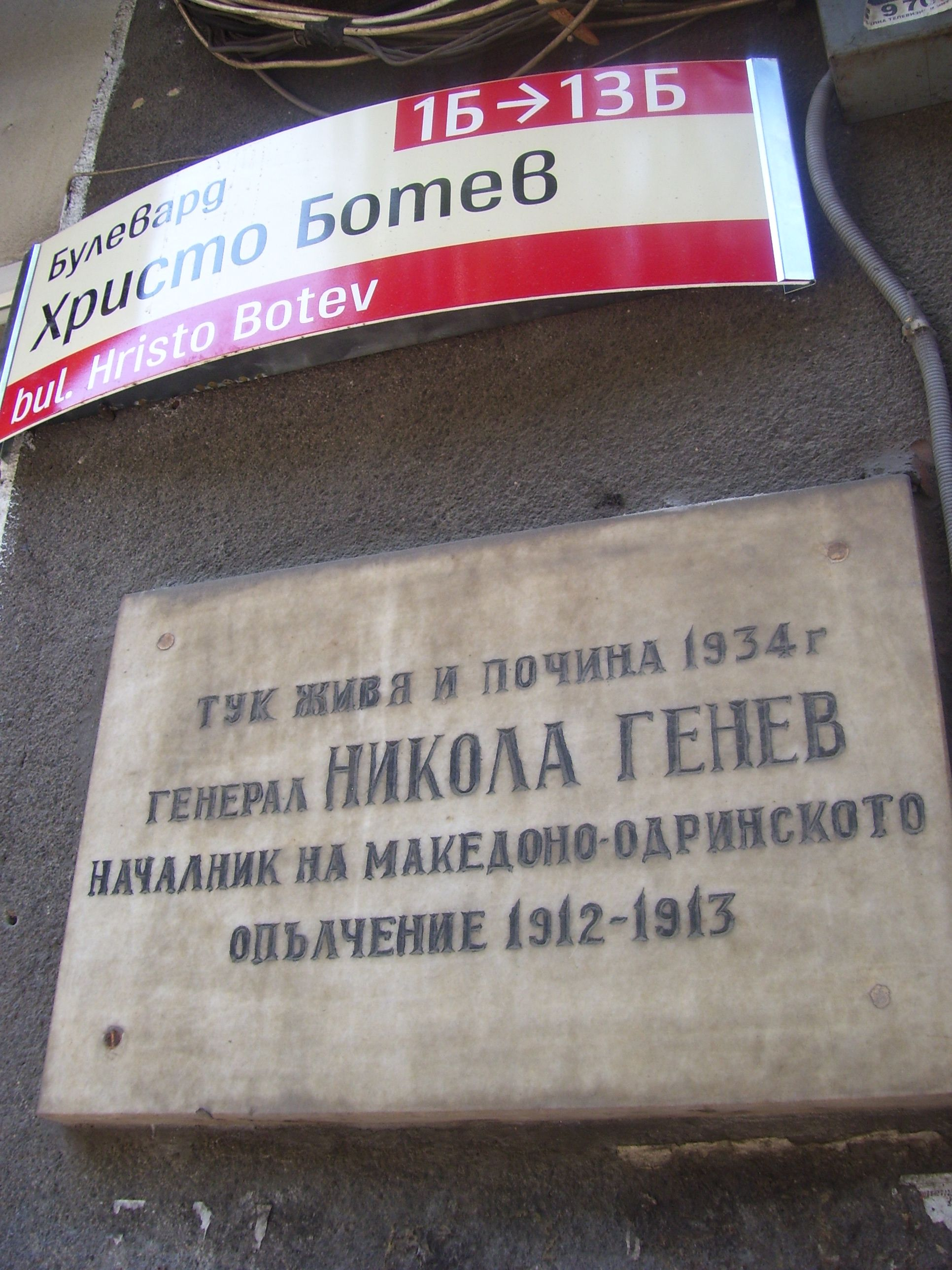
Memorial plaque of Nikola Genev's home on Hristo Botev Boulevard in Sofia.

During the First Balkan War, Major General Genev returned to the Bulgarian Land Forces. He was appointed commander of the Macedonian-Adrianopolitan Volunteer Corps, and from 11 October 1912, of the Kardzhali detachment. He took part in the fighting in Aegean Thrace, which ended with the capture of the corps of Yaver Pasha in November that year. At the beginning of 1913, the militiamen under his command took part in the Battle of Şarköy, where they repulsed a large Turkish landing party.

During the Second Balkan War in 1913, the militia waged military operations against the Serbs near Kochani and Tsarevo Selo. After the end of the war, Lieutenant General Nikola Genev again went into the reserves of the Bulgarian Land Forces.

Nikola Genev was one of the officers who signed the protest letter to Tsar Ferdinand I against Bulgaria's participation in the First World War on the side of the Central Powers and thus, resigned from military service.

Lieutenant General Nikola Genev died on 12 April 1934 in Sofia.

== Awards ==
- Order of Bravery, III grade, 2nd class
- Order "For Courage" IV grade, 2nd class
- Order of Saint Alexander
- Stara Planina, I degree with swords, posthumously

=== Foreign Awards ===
- Russian Empire: Order of St. George, IV degree

== Bibliography ==
- Dimitrov, I., The Union 1885 - encyclopedic reference book, Sofia, 1985, State Publishing House "Dr. Peter Beron", p. 77
- Nedev, S., The Command of the Bulgarian Army during the Wars of National Unification, Sofia, 1993, Military Publishing Complex "St. George the Victorious"
- The compound 1885 - encyclopedic reference book. Sofia: State Publishing House "Dr. Peter Beron". 1985.
