= List of Bulgarian generals from 1878 to 1946 =

This is a list of Bulgarian generals from the period of the Principality (1878–1908) and Kingdom (1908–1946). The year each became a general is given in parentheses.

== List ==
=== A ===
- Abadzhiev, Georgi — Major General (1913)
- Avramov, Ivan — Major General (1921)
- Agura, Georgi — Major General (1900)
- Azmanov, Stefan — Major General (1918)
- Atanasov, Rashko — Major General (1935)

=== B ===
- Bakardzhiev, Nikola — Infantry General (1934)
- Balabanov, Boncho — Major General (1900)
- Balkanski, Milenko — Major General (1917)
- Batsarov, Ivan — Major General (1917)
- Belov, Stefan — Major General (1917)
- Blaskov, Andrey — Major General (1904)
- Bonchev, Ivan — Major General (1918)
- Bogdanov, Stefan — Lieutenant General (1920)
- Botev, Kiril — Lieutenant General (1912)
- Bocharov, Stefan — Major General (c. 1910)
- Bochev, Nikola — Major General (1900)
- Boshnakov, Georgi — Major General (1918)
- Boyadzhiev, Kliment — Lieutenant General (1915)
- Bradistilov, Stoyu — Lieutenant General (1917)
- Burmov, Hristo — Lieutenant General (1936)
- Barnev, Panayot — Lieutenant General (1918)
- Boydev, Vasili — Lieutenant General (1939)

=== C ===
- Charakchiev, Hristo — Major General (1917)

=== D ===
- Davidov, Aleksandar — Major General (1925)
- Daskalov, Teodosi — Infantry General (1942)
- Delov, Vasil — Major General (1913)
- Dikov, Vicho — Lieutenant General (1913)
- Dimitriev, Iliya — Major General (1908)
- Dimitriev, Radko — Lieutenant General (1912)
- Dipchev, Ivan — Major General (1934)
- Draganov, Yanko — Lieutenant General (1917)

=== F ===
- Fichev, Ivan — Lieutenant General (1914)

=== G ===
- Genchev, Nikola — Lieutenant General (1945)
- Genev, Nikola — Major General (1904)
- Georgiev, Konstantin — Major General (1920)
- Georgiev, Todor — Lieutenant General (1934)
- Geshev, Dimitar — Infantry General (1919)

=== H ===
- Hadzhipetkov, Nikola — Lieutenant General (1940)
- Hesapchiev, Hristofor — Major General (1910)
- Hristov, Pavel — Infantry General (1917)
- Hristov, Nikola - Lieutenant General (1944)

=== I ===
- Ivanov, Georgi — Major General (1909)
- Ivanov, Nikola — Infantry General (1936)
- Ilyev, Stefan — Major General (1900)

=== K ===
- Kantardzhiev, Todor — Lieutenant General (1917)
- Ketskarov, Vladimir — Major General (1935)
- Kirkov, Dimitar — Major General (1912)
- Kirkov, Konstantin — Major General (1918)
- Kiselov, Panteley — Infantry General (1920)
- Kisyov, Aleksandar — General of the Cavalry (1931)
- Kovachev, Stiliyan — Infantry General (1936)
- Kolev, Ivan — Lieutenant General (1917)
- Kolev, Krum — Major General (1944)
- Krayovski, Stanislav — Major General (1935)
- Krstev, Asen — Major General (1941)
- Kutinchev, Vasil — Infantry General (1918)

=== L ===
- Lazarov, Velizar — Infantry General (1929)
- Lilkov, Hristo — Major General (1944)
- Lolov, Petar — Major General (1917)
- Lukash, Konstantin — Lieutenant General (1940)
- Lukov, Ivan — Lieutenant General (1920)
- Lukov, Hristo K. — Lieutenant General (1938)
- Lukov, Hristo Ts. — Major General (1907)
- Lyubomski, Stefan — Major General (1892)

=== M ===
- Marinkov, Sotir — Lieutenant General (1933)
- Marinov, Ivan — Lieutenant General (1944)
- Marinov, Krastyu — Major General (1900)
- Markov, Ivan — Major General (1919)
- Markov, Ivan — Lieutenant General (1940)
- Markov, Petar — Cavalry General (1918)
- Markov, Todor — Major General (1917)
- Marholev, Genko — Major General (1936)
- Marchin, Georgi — Major General (1913)
- Midilev, Petar — Major General (1930)
- Mitov, Todor — Major General (1915)
- Mikhov, Nikola — Lieutenant General (1942)
- Mutkurov, Sava — Major General (1891)
- Nam, My - Supreme Commander (1878)

=== N ===
- Nakov, Nikola - Lieutenant General (1944)
- Nazlamov, Atanas — Lieutenant General (1918)
- Naydenov, Kalin — Lieutenant General (1917)
- Nedev, Nikola — Major General (1935)
- Nedyalkov, Hristo — Lieutenant General (1919)
- Nerezov, Stefan — Infantry General (1920)
- Nikiforov, Nikifor — Lieutenant General (1912)
- Nikolaev, Danail — Infantry General (1909)
- Nikolov, Asen N. — Major General (1917)
- Nikolov, Kosta — Major General (1937)

=== P ===
- Pakov, Hristo — Major General (1936)
- Papadopov, Asen — Major General (1914)
- Paprikov, Stefan — Lieutenant General (1908)
- Peev, Yordan — Major General (1936)
- Peev, Panayot — Major General (1905)
- Pernikliyski, Dimitar — Major General (1917)
- Petrov, Ivan — Major General (1917)
- Petrov, Racho — Infantry General (1936)
- Petrunov, Hristo — Major General (1900)
- Pisarov, Nikola — Major General (1919)
- Popdimitrov, Aleksander — Major General (1943)
- Popov, Georgi — Artillery General (1941)
- Popov, Ivan T. — Major General (1909)
- Popov, Stefan — Major General (1918)
- Popov, Hristo — Lieutenant General (1919)
- Protogerov, Aleksandar — Lieutenant General (19??)
- Pushkarov, Stoyan — Major General (1918)

=== R ===
- Radev, Todor — Major General (1934)
- Ribarov, Nikola — Lieutenant General (1917)
- Rusev, Ivan — Major General (1917)
- Rusev, Rusi — Artillery General (1944)
- Ryaskov, Nikola — Major General (1905)

=== S ===
- Savov, Sava — Infantry General (1919)
- Savov, Mihail — Lieutenant General (1908)
- Sapov, Georgi — Major General (1928)
- Sapunarov, Mihail — Major General (1918)
- Sarafov, Ivan — Major General (1905)
- Shkoynov, Ivan — Major General (1919)
- Sirakov, Asen — Major General (1943)
- Sirakov, Radoy — Major General (1906)
- Sirmanov, Ierotey — Major General (1918)
- Slavkov, Raycho — Lieutenant General (1944)
- Slavchev, Stefan — Lieutenant General (19??)
- Solarov, Konstantin — Infantry General (1934)
- Stanchev, Kiril — Lieutenant General (1944)
- Stefanov, Atanas — Lieutenant General (1943)
- Stoykov, Ivan — Major General (1917)
- Stoychev, Vladimir — Lieutenant General (1944)
- Stoychev, Nikola — Lieutenant General (1942)
- Stoyanov, Vladimir — Major General (1925)
- Stoyanov, Konstantin — Major General (1941)

=== T ===
- Tabakov, Ivan — Major General (1918)
- Tanev, Aleksandar — Lieutenant General (1918)
- Tanintchev, Vladimir - Artillery Major General (1930)
- Tanovski, Georgi — Major General (1936)
- Tantilov, Petar — Lieutenant General (1918)
- Tasev, Stefan — Major General (1917)
- Tenev, Pravoslav — Infantry General (1918)
- Todorov, Georgi — Infantry General (1917)
- Topaldzhikov, Nikola — Major General (1923)
- Toshev, Stefan — Infantry General (1917)
- Trifonov, Trifon — Major General (1943)
- Tsanev, Stefan — Lieutenant General (1936)
- Tsenov, Panteley — Lieutenant General (1918)
- Tserkovski, Vaklin — Major General (1907)
- Tsonchev, Ivan — Major General (1901)
- Tsaklev, Petko — Major General (1918)

=== U ===
- Uzunski, Konstantin - Major General (unknown)
- Urumov, Boyan - Major General (1938)

=== V ===
- Vazov, Vladimir — Lieutenant General (1920)
- Vazov, Georgi — Lieutenant General (1913)
- Vasilev, Valko — Major General (1916)
- Vatev, Anastas — Major General (1930)
- Velchev, Damyan — Colonel General (1945)
- Velchev, Valko — Major General (1901)
- Venedikov, Yordan — Major General (1935)
- Vinarov, Varban — Major General (1900)
- Valkov, Ivan — Infantry General (1928)
- Valnarov, Dimitar — Major General (1907)

=== Y ===
- Yankov, Simeon — Major General (1910)
- Yanchulev, Kiril — Major General (1943)
- Yovov, Mihail — Major General (1933)

=== Z ===
- Zagorski, Stoyan — Lieutenant General (1918)
- Zafirov, Atila — Major General (1917)
- Zaimov, Vladimir - Major General (1935)
- Zhekov, Nikola — Infantry General (1936)
- Zhelyavski, Nikola — Lieutenant General (1918)
- Zhostov, Konstantin — Major General (1915)
- Zlatarev, Krastyu — Lieutenant General (1919)
- Zlatev, Pencho — Lieutenant General (1934)
