= Mihail Savov =

Bulgarian general (1857–1928)

Mihail Popov Savov
- Михаил Попов Савов

Minister of War of the Principality of Bulgaria
- In office 16 February 1891 – 27 April 1894
- Monarch: Ferdinand I
- Prime Minister: Stefan Stambolov
- Preceded by: Sava Mutkurov
- Succeeded by: Racho Petrov

Minister of War of the Principality of Bulgaria
- In office 31 March 1903 – 4 May 1907
- Monarch: Ferdinand I
- Prime Minister: Stoyan Danev; Racho Petrov; Dimitar Petkov; Dimitar Stanchov; Petar Gudev
- Preceded by: Stefan Paprikov
- Succeeded by: Danail Nikolaev

Minister Plenipotentiary of Bulgaria to France
- In office 1920–1923
- Monarch: Boris III

Minister Plenipotentiary of Bulgaria to Belgium
- In office 1922–1923
- Monarch: Boris III

Personal details
- Born: 26 November 1857 Eski Zagra, Ottoman Empire (today Stara Zagora, Bulgaria)
- Died: 21 July 1928 (aged 70) Saint-Vallier-de-Thiey, France
- Awards: See below

Military service
- Allegiance: Bulgaria
- Branch/service: Bulgarian Army
- Years of service: 1879–1913
- Rank: Lieutenant general
- Commands: Left flank at Slivnitsa (1885); Military School in Sofia (director, 1897–1903); Assistant Commander-in-Chief of the Active Army (1912–1913); United 4th, 5th, 2nd Armies (1913)
- Battles/wars: Serbo-Bulgarian War; Battle of Slivnitsa; Battle of Pirot; First Balkan War; Bulgarian front; Second Balkan War; Battle of Kalimanci; Battle of Kresna Gorge

Mihail Popov Savov (Bulgarian: Михаил Попов Савов) (born 26 November 1857 in Stara Zagora - died 21 July 1928 in Saint-Vallier-de-Thiey, France) was a Bulgarian lieutenant general, government minister and diplomat who played a central role in Bulgaria’s military affairs during the late 19th and early 20th centuries. A veteran of the Serbo-Bulgarian War of 1885, he served twice as Minister of War, from 1891 to 1894 and from 1903 to 1907. Savov served as assistant commander-in-chief (de facto commander-in-chief) of the Bulgarian Army during the Balkan Wars of 1912–1913. After his military career, he also served as a Bulgarian diplomatic representative in France and Belgium.

== Early life and Careeer ==
He was born on 26 November 1857 in Stara Zagora into a modest merchant family. The young Mihail Savov received his early education in Haskovo and Plovdiv, and finally completed the fifth class at the First Aprilov High School in Gabrovo. After that, he went to study at the Imperial Lyceum in Galatasaray in the capital of the Ottoman Empire, Constantinople. There he received a high-quality education, with instruction conducted in Turkish and French, and graduated in 1876. The Russo-Turkish War of 1877–1878 and the Liberation of Bulgaria in 1878 prompted Mihail Savov to become a military officer, for which purpose he enrolled in the first class of the Military School in Sofia. There Savov studied tactics, field fortifications, topography and photography, and military administration, among other things. On 22 May 1879 he graduated from the Military School and was promoted to the rank of second lieutenant.

After his graduation, Savov arrived in Plovdiv, the capital of Eastern Rumelia, and was appointed first to the 12th Infantry Company of the Eastern Rumelian Militia and later as the head of a section in the staff of the Eastern Rumelian Militia. His qualities were noticed by the militia command, which gave him the opportunity to pursue advanced military education abroad; thus, he was sent first to France, and from 1882 he attended the Nicholas General Staff Academy in Saint Petersburg, Russia, for a three-year course, which he completed on 13 April 1885. After his return to the militia of Eastern Rumelia, Savov was appointed adjutant to Governor-General Gavril Krastevich. In this post, Savov experienced the Unification of the Principality of Bulgaria with Eastern Rumelia. Three days later, on 21 September 1885, he was promoted to the rank of captain and appointed to the post of adjutant to Prince Alexander Battenberg and to the Army.

== Serbo-Bulgarian War ==
With the outbreak of the Serbo-Bulgarian War, Captain Savov quickly became noticed for his command and organizational abilities. He contributed to the fast integration of units from the former Eastern Rumelian Militia into the Bulgarian army. Captain Mihail Savov served as Assistant Chief of the General Staff of the Army, and as head of the Structural Department within the General Staff, and directed the operational planning of the Bulgarian army throughout the war. Savov played a significant role in organizing and carrying out the Bulgarian mobilization and in the march of the Bulgarian Eastern Corps from the Bulgarian-Ottoman frontier westward toward the front with Serbia.

He was appointed commander of the Bulgarian left wing at the Battle of Slivnitsa, where he played a key role in repelling the Serbian Morava Division. Later, he also took part in the final Battle of Pirot. At the end of the war, Mihail Savov also served for a short time as Chief of Staff and commander of the 5th Infantry Brigade. He was awarded with Order of Bravery III grade.

== Military Career until the Balkan Wars ==
In 1886, he participated in the commission for the settlement of the Bulgarian-Ottoman border in the Rhodope Mountains and served in the headquarters of the Minister of Defence. Between 1886 and 1887 he was assistant of the Defence Minister. On 17 April 1887 he was promoted to major and worked in the Department of the General Stuff as officer in the 5th infantry brigade.

In 1887 Mihail Savov was appointed for Fligel Adjutant of Knyaz Ferdinand. On 16 February he became Minister of Defence in the cabinet of Stefan Stambolov and on 2 August in the same year was promoted to lieutenant colonel. After the fall of Stambolov in 1894, he was dismissed from the army, but in 1897 his position was restored and he became director of the Military School until 1903. On 1 January 1899 he was promoted to colonel.

Between 1903 and 1908 Savov was again Minister of Defence in the third cabinet of Stoyan Danev, in the second cabinet of Racho Petrov and in the cabinets of Dimitar Petkov, Dimitar Stanchov and Petar Gudev. On 1 January 1904 he was promoted to major general. In 1907 he was charged for corruption and malpractice with the supply of weapons. On 30 October 1908 he was promoted to lieutenant general and left the army for the second time.

In the weeks before the start of the First Balkan War, Mihail Savov was again drawn into discussions about Bulgaria's military preparations and organization. At the time, he was living in a village called Ferdinandovo near Plovdiv and was awaiting judicial proceedings connected with corruption scandals from his previous ministership. When Prime Minister Ivan Geshov visited him on 15 September to ask for his opinion on the chances of the Balkan League in a war against the Ottoman Empire, Savov estimated the chances of victory for the Balkan League at around 85 percent, given that the mobilization, supply, and deployment went according to plan.

During the mobilization of the Bulgarian Army in September 1912, Ferdinand considered placing Savov as commander-in-chief. Savov was regarded as a capable, experienced, and energetic commander and had considerable prestige within the army. His confidence stood in contrast to the more cautious Fichev. On 22 September 1912, Ferdinand created the Main Headquarters of the Active Army and formally assumed the position of commander-in-chief. Savov was appointed his assistant, while Fichev became chief of staff. Savov's exact position within the high command, however, was not clearly defined as he wished. As assistant to the commander-in-chief, he was directly subordinate to Ferdinand, while the relationship between the monarch, the government, and the Main Headquarters remained constitutionally unclear.

== First Balkan War ==
=== Bulgarian offensive in Thrace ===
With the beginning of operations around Lozengrad in Eastern Thrace, Savov's outlook differed from the position taken by Chief of Staff Ivan Fichev. Fichev was worried about a possible Ottoman counter-offensive and already started considering defensive plans in case the Bulgarian offensive failed, while Savov remained confident in the Bulgarian army and its ability. On 9 October 1912, Stoyan Danev met Ferdinand after being told that Fichev panicked and said the fighting around Lozengrad could develop into another prolonged siege similar to Pleven and that diplomatic intervention might be necessary. Ferdinand was furious with Fichev's conduct. Savov intervened in the discussion and reassured Danev by telling him not to be influenced by overly theoretical assessments and confidently predicted that Lozengrad would fall the following day. The Bulgarian success later confirmed Savov's prediction. Ferdinand discussed his dissatisfaction with the chief of staff directly with Savov and blamed Fichev's pessimistic views for spreading uncertainty among the political and military leadership of Bulgaria.

After the Bulgarian victory at Lule Burgas, Savov at first supported the possibility of bringing the war to an end by means of diplomatic mediation. However, his position soon changed with the Bulgarian armies continuing their offensive toward Çatalca. On 25 October, Ferdinand, ever more focused on the possibility of reaching Constantinople, ordered Savov by telephone to continue the offensive towards the Çatalca defensive line. Savov argued that an armistice at this stage of the campaign would be harmful to Bulgarian interests. On 28 October, Savov sent an inquiry to the armies concerning their strength, morale, ammunition, and food supplies. The responses indicated that they were considered capable of continuing the advance. The Bulgarian armies, however, also started facing more serious logistical difficulties, including long supply lines, poor roads, and shortages of food and transport.

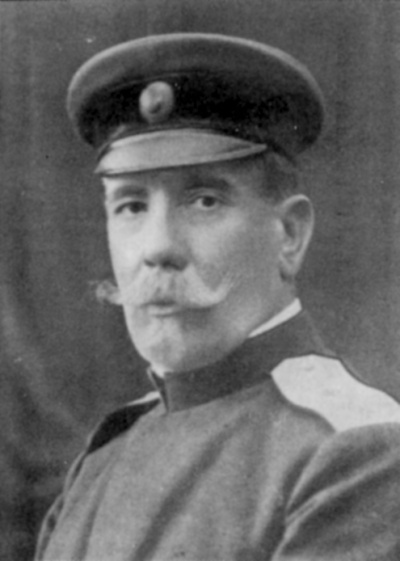
Mihail Savov

On 30 October, the Bulgarian armies started to prepare their positions for an eventual assault on Çatalca. Savov informed Ferdinand that the troops were strengthening their positions in preparation for an attack. At first, Savov and Fichev agreed that the attack should not be rushed. On the morning of 1 November, after considering the arguments for and against an assault, they decided that the armies first needed to be properly coordinated and prepared. The rapidly spreading cholera epidemic made a prolonged delay increasingly dangerous. The disease coincided with a wider deterioration of the Bulgarian medical and logistical system: the rapid advance had stretched field hospitals and transport, while the troops arriving to Çatalca were increasingly tired and undersupplied. Savov was sent to the front to examine the condition of the troops, meet with the commanders of the armies, and report their views before a final decision could be made. Savov thought the authority given to him allowed him to order the attack if he considered the circumstances favorable.

Ferdinand personally authorized Savov to order an attack if he found the operation feasible. Savov went to the headquarters of the United First and Third Armies, and there he discussed the readiness and supply of the troops with Generals Radko Dimitriev and Vasil Kutinchev. After several meetings, Savov ordered the United First and Third Armies to begin their offensive against the Çatalca position on the morning of 4 November. Dimitriev asked Savov to assume direct command of the United Armies for the battle, but Savov declined, explaining that he did not know the terrain well enough and was expected to return to Lozengrad.

The attack on the Çatalca position began before dawn on 4 November 1912. Savov remained near the front with Radko Dimitriev and observed the fighting. The strength of the Ottoman artillery and the limited effect of the Bulgarian artillery quickly became apparent, although the Bulgarian command still believed that the attack could succeed. Bulgarian artillery failed to achieve superiority like in the previous battles in Thrace; much of it lacked the range and weight necessary to suppress the Ottoman batteries, while Ottoman artillery and naval gunfire strengthened the defenses, particularly on the southern part of the line. During the evening Dimitriev again asked Savov to assume direct command of the United First and Third Armies, but Savov declined and returned to Lozengrad, still expressing confidence that the battle would be resolved quickly.

First battle of Çatalca

By 5 November the offensive had stalled and Dimitriev ordered the attack to stop. The failure reflected a combination of strong Ottoman defenses, ineffective concentration and weight of Bulgarian artillery, exhaustion, worsening weather and disease. The attacks had been dispersed across much of the front rather than concentrated against a decisive point, exposing the infantry to heavy fire. Savov's responsibility for the decision to attack became controversial later. Although he had ordered the operation, he was not in direct command during the battle. Savov defended the operation by arguing that its strategic conception had been sound but that errors had been made in its tactical execution.

The failure at Çatalca changed Savov's attitude toward further offensives. By 8 November Savov and Fichev had concluded that the United Armies were not capable of further offensive action and estimated that the troops required at least twenty days of rest because of the cholera, exhaustion and supply difficulties. Together with Fichev, he opposed proposals requiring the United Armies to withdraw from their positions at Çatalca, believing that such a move could leave them vulnerable if the war continued. By 19–20 November Savov's main worry was the condition and supply of the armies. He and Fichev warned Stoyan Danev that excessive political demands should not prevent the conclusion of an armistice and leave the exhausted troops indefinitely in the cholera-stricken positions at Çatalca.

=== Armistice and the London Peace Conference ===
Mihail Savov (in the front) and other Bulgarian officers during the First Balkan War

The armistice brought the fighting on the front to an end, leaving the opposing armies in their existing positions and allowed Bulgaria to use the railway passing Adrianople to supply its exhausted forces before Çatalca. He regarded the suspension of hostilities mostly as an opportunity to restore the effectiveness and supply of the armies and estimated that around twenty-five days would be required to provision the field army adequately. At the beginning of December Savov received broader authority over the acting army and effectively assumed the day-to-day functions of commander-in-chief, although Ferdinand remained formally supreme commander. The opening of the London Peace Conference on 3 December did not lead Savov to abandon preparations for renewed war. The Ottoman delegation also sought to prolong the negotiations, using the suspension of hostilities to rest and reinforce its forces while hoping to benefit from growing disagreements within the Balkan League. On 7 December Savov ordered that, if hostilities resumed, the First and Third Armies were to defend their existing Çatalca positions, arguing that their abandonment was unacceptable for both military and political reasons.

On 6 December Savov appointed a commission to examine an eventual assault on Adrianople. Its conclusions rejected an immediate frontal attack as too costly and instead called for stronger siege artillery, additional infantry and engineers before a final assault could be attempted. The shortage of sufficiently powerful siege artillery had constrained Bulgarian operations around Adrianople from the beginning of the siege and limited the effectiveness of the bombardment against its prepared defenses. Savov simultaneously warned that illness, frostbite, inadequate clothing and shortages of food and fodder threatened to immobilize the army, and he pressed the government to improve its supply.

On 22 December Savov went to the Çatalca front, where the condition of the Third Army had improved considerably, strengthening Savov's belief that Bulgaria could resume operations. The Bulgarian High Command planned a renewed offensive in which the First and Third Armies would cooperate with each other and attack Çatalca while the Fourth Army prevented Ottoman troops from threatening the Bulgarian flank on the Gallipoli front. On 25 December he and Colonel Stefan Nerezov met Ottoman representatives, including Foreign Minister Gabriel Noradoungian and War Minister Nazım Pasha, near Constantinople. The Ottoman side indicated that it was prepared to make concessions in Macedonia but remained unwilling to surrender Adrianople. Savov replied that Bulgarian policy on Adrianople was unified and that no Bulgarian government could abandon the demand without risking a serious internal backlash.

=== Breakdown of the armistice and Adrianople ===
On 31 December Savov ordered preparations for a possible Ottoman attempt to break through after the armistice ended, while the High Command examined offensive possibilities at Adrianople, Çatalca and Gallipoli. At the military conference of 2 January 1913 he reported about 250,000 men ready for operations. General Nikola Ivanov believed Adrianople could be captured at a cost of roughly 6,000–7,000 casualties, while Dimitriev and Fichev remained much less confident about renewed offensive operations. The Young Turk coup in Constantinople sharply changed the situation. The Young Turks were determined to continue the war rather than surrender Adrianople, one of the principal issues that had helped provoke the overthrow of Kâmil Pasha's government. Savov immediately ordered the armies to prepare and considered the Bulgarian army capable of resuming operations.

Savov's report of 16 January stated that further delay was dangerous because the Ottomans were recovering; nevertheless, major offensive operations at Çatalca and Gallipoli might remain impracticable for two or three months because of winter and the condition of the troops. By the eve of renewed hostilities Savov's strategy was clear: The First and Third Armies at Çatalca were to hold the Ottoman forces in place, while the decisive effort shifted toward Adrianople. On 21 January Savov explicitly identified the fortress as Bulgaria's main objective, with the Second Army responsible for its reduction and the Fourth Army maintaining pressure on the Gallipoli front.

Mihail Savov on a postcard

With the resumption of the war, Savov sought to tighten the connection between the High Command and the field armies. He required regular reports from the commanders and initially resisted committing the army to major offensive operations. At the siege of Adrianople, he wanted the necessary heavy artillery concentrated before an assault, while the armies at Çatalca and Gallipoli were primarily to hold the Ottoman forces and prevent them from relieving the fortress. The Ottoman operations on the Gallipoli Peninsula and along the Sea of Marmara were intended to break the Bulgarian position there, threaten the rear of the forces besieging Adrianople and create an opportunity for the relief of the fortress. Savov warned the Fourth Army against attacking at Bulair without sufficient reconnaissance, but authorized more active operations as the enemy's intentions became apparent. The Bulgarian victory at the Battle of Bulair and the defeat of the Ottoman landing during the Battle of Şarköy removed the threat to the Bulgarian flank and prevented the Gallipoli army from intervening around Adrianople.

Savov was cautious to order an attack on Adrianople. This hesitation reflected the material condition of the besieging army. The Bulgarians still lacked sufficient heavy artillery and Savov preferred to allow hunger and continued pressure to weaken the fortress, if possible, rather than incur major loss of infantry like at Çatalca. The siege was becoming increasingly severe. Adrianople contained both a large garrison and a substantial civilian population that had to be fed, while the besieging forces also depended on long supply routes and increasingly suffered from the effects of winter conditions. Savov's decisions were also influenced by the deteriorating relations inside the Balkan League. The growing disputes over Macedonia placed additional pressure on Bulgaria to bring the campaign in Thrace to an end, since both Serbia and Greece were consolidating their positions in territories claimed by Bulgaria. On 16 February Savov described the fortress as no longer a first-class strategic objective, but emphasized that its political importance had become greater than ever.

=== Capture of Adrianople and renewed armistice ===
The Bulgarian General Staff at Adrianople after its capture. Mihail Savov is in the center without a belt and with two hands on his sword.

By mid-March Savov was still reluctant to order an assault on Adrianople. Reports indicated that the fortress was increasingly isolated and the garrison weakening, but he was still concerned about ammunition and the lack of heavy artillery. General Nikola Ivanov, commander of the Second Army, argued that further delays would make the operation even more difficult. Food shortages were meanwhile worsening inside the fortress, while Serbian heavy artillery strengthened the besieging forces. On 23 March Savov ordered the Second Army to attack the following day, with the decisive effort directed against the eastern sector. The other sectors were to prevent Ottoman reinforcements from being transferred to said sector, while Bulgarian forces at Çatalca and Gallipoli maintained pressure on the Ottoman field armies.

The assault began during the night of 24–25 March with Bulgarian infantry breking through the forward defenses of the eastern sector and forced the defenders back toward the main fortifications. By the evening of 25 March the attackers had reached the principal fortress line, and the attack continued during the night. The concentration of artillery and infantry against the eastern sector proved decisive against an increasingly exhausted and undersupplied garrison. During the early hours of 26 March Bulgarian troops broke into the eastern forts and Ottoman defenses began to collapse. Savov telegraphed Ferdinand and the government that the fall of Adrianople during the day was inevitable. Şükrü Pasha was taken into Bulgarian custody and formally surrendered to Ivanov. Artillery had played a central role in weakening the defenses and preparing the final infantry assault. The capture of Adrianople released substantial Bulgarian forces and artillery for use elsewhere in Thrace and gave Bulgaria a major military success at a moment when disputes with Serbia and Greece over Macedonia were becoming increasingly urgent.

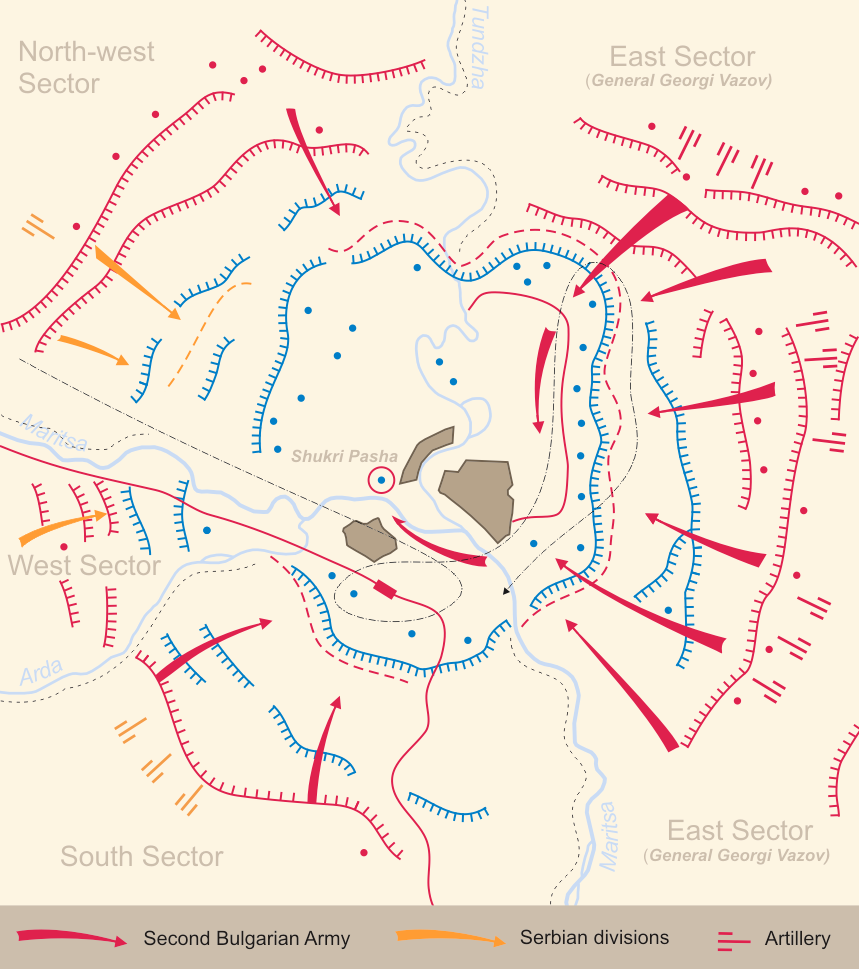
Siege of Adrianople 1912-13

On 30 March Savov argued that the victory should be used to accelerate peace and was also concerned that the army was not adequately supplied for a prolonged summer campaign. Fighting still continued around Çatalca and Savov explained on 5 April that recent Bulgarian operations were intended to support the Adrianople campaign and recover useful positions, not to begin a general advance to Constantinople. Savov then proposed the establishment of a ceasefire and neutral zones. Savov instructed General Stefan Toshev to negotiate with the Ottoman representatives. Talks opened on 13 April east of Çatalca, and the Bulgarian conditions were accepted in principle. That evening Savov ordered hostilities to cease at noon on 14 April. Although initially an oral arrangement rather than a formal armistice, it effectively ended the fighting between the Bulgarian and Ottoman armies while peace negotiations continued.

=== Treaty of London and the Macedonian crisis ===
With operations against the Ottoman Empire practically over, Savov increasingly turned his attention toward the deteriorating relations with Serbia and Greece and became concerned that Serbia and Greece intended to retain the territories occupied by their armies in Macedonia. Although he continued to support settlement of the Serbian dispute according to the 1912 alliance treaty and Russian arbitration, he increasingly believed that Bulgaria had to prepare militarily in case diplomacy failed. Bulgaria also faced Romanian demands in Southern Dobruja, which were considered at the St Petersburg Ambassadors' Conference.

Savov was highly confident in the Bulgarian army's ability to defeat its former allies and reported to the government that once Bulgaria had disengaged from the Ottoman front and concentrated its forces, the Serbian and Greek armies could be defeated and that Bulgaria would enjoy a favorable military position. He regarded a simultaneous war with Serbia and Greece as winnable provided that Bulgarian forces were concentrated in time and not left dispersed between Thrace and Macedonia. Savov pressed for the gradual concentration of Bulgarian forces toward Macedonia while attempting to avoid incidents that might allow Serbia or Greece to portray Bulgaria as the aggressor. The Second Army was prepared for transfer toward southeastern Macedonia, and commanders were instructed to retain important positions but to exercise caution toward neighboring allied forces.

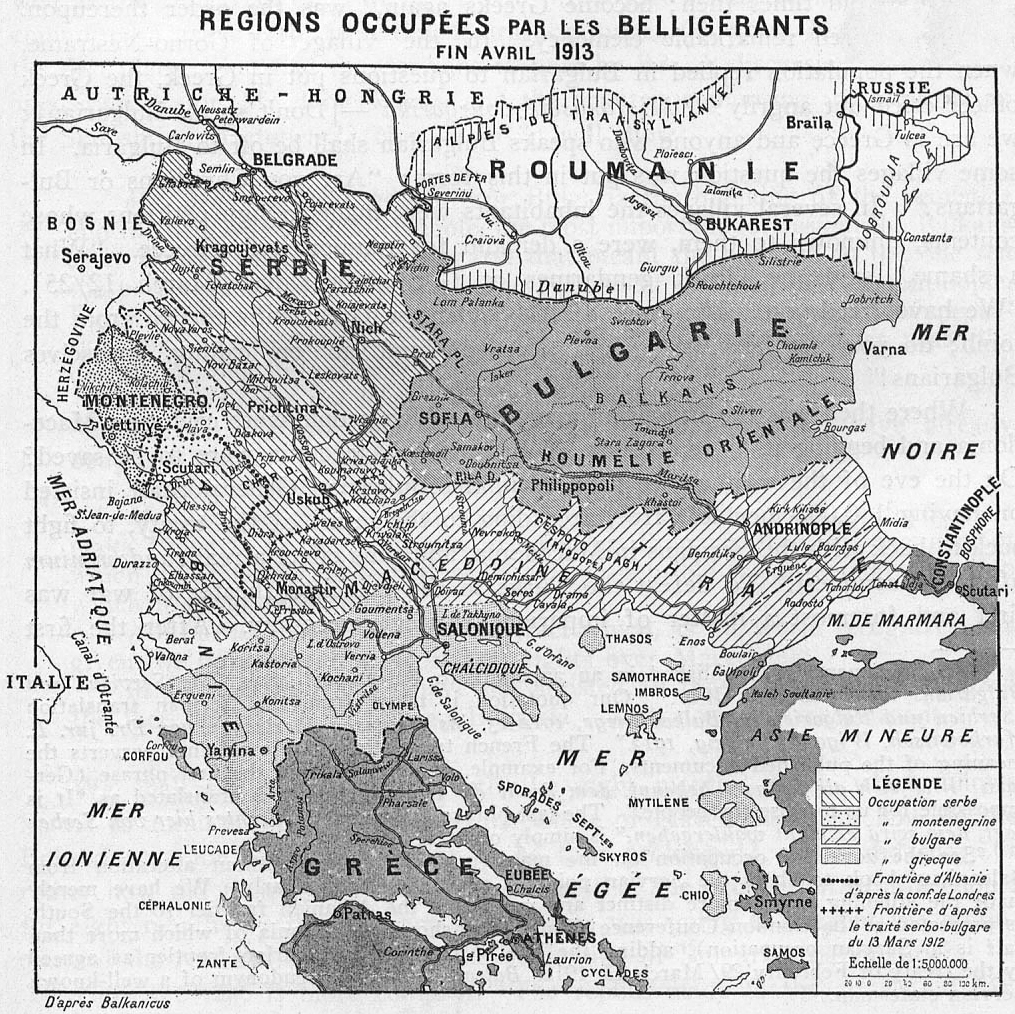
Division of Ottoman territories by the Balkan League

The unresolved Ottoman war increasingly became an obstacle to Bulgaria's position against its allies. Savov repeatedly argued that formal peace had to be concluded as quickly as possible so that the armies in Thrace could be redeployed to Macedonia. Serbia and Greece, by contrast, benefited from delay because it allowed them to strengthen their positions in Macedonia while the largest Bulgarian forces remained tied down in Thrace. Meanwhile, the Great Powers increased their pressure for an immediate settlement with the Ottoman Empire. On 30 May 1913, the Balkan allies and the Ottoman Empire signed the Treaty of London, formally ending the First Balkan War. The Ottoman Empire relinquished its European territories west of the Enos–Midia line, while questions concerning Albania and the Aegean islands were left largely to the Great Powers. The treaty ended the Ottoman war but left unresolved the increasingly dangerous territorial disputes among the victorious allies, above all the division of Macedonia. Savov welcomed the settlement because it finally removed the obstacle of the Bulgarian army to move from Thrace to Macedonia. The Treaty of London gave Bulgaria the military freedom Savov had repeatedly demanded, but it came at a moment when the Balkan League was already close to collapse and Serbian and Greek forces were consolidating against Bulgaria.

== Second Balkan War ==
=== The Savov–Nerezov plan ===
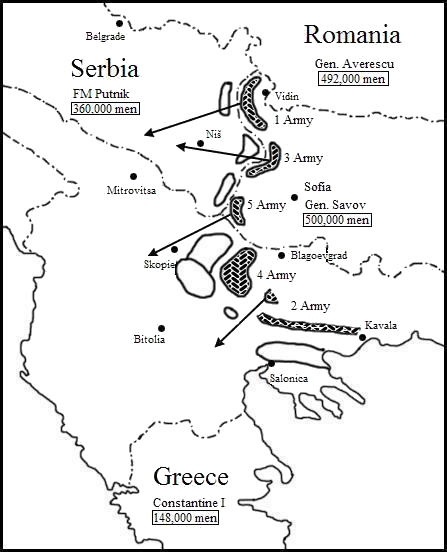
The initial plan of the Bulgarian Army (Savov-Nerezov)

On 31 May General Mihail Savov, together with Colonel Stefan Nerezov, drafted plans for an eventual war with both Serbia and Greece. According to the plan, the First Army under General Vasil Kutinchev was to advance toward Knjaževac and Zaječar in the Timok Valley, after which to move toward Pirot and join up with the Third Army. The Third Army under General Radko Dimitriev was tasked with tying down the Serbian forces near Pirot, leaving a covering force in the direction of Niš, and, together with the First Army, attack and capture Pirot. The two united armies then had to advance along the Morava valley toward Kumanovo and deliver a decisive blow against the main Serbian forces around Ovče Pole. The Cavalry Division was to operate on between the Third and First Armies. The Fifth Army, under General Stefan Toshev, was to serve as the "axis of rotation" of the entire Bulgarian army, drawing as many Serbian forces as possible to the Sultan Tepe–Kriva Palanka–Mount Kitka sector.

The biggest Bulgarian Army, the Fourth, under General Stiliyan Kovachev, was to advance in the Štip–Zletovo sector and capture the Serbian forward positions, while its left wing had to drive the enemy behind the Vardar River. After establishing itself in said positions, the Fourth Army was to send four brigades to reinforce the Second Army, under General Nikola Ivanov, and join the operations against the Greek Army. After awaiting the appearance of the First and Third Armies, the bulk of the Fourth Army, would go on the offensive and join the combined operations of the First, Third, and Fifth Armies and decisively defeat the Serbian army.

The Second Army needed to advance and fortify itself along the Aegean coast and the left bank of the Struma River. The right wing had to seize Gevgelija, while its centre had to occupy favourable starting positions for a general advance toward Thessaloniki after the arrival of reinforcements from the Fourth Army. Savov's overall strategic concept was for a fast and decisive blow against the Serbian army, which he thought was the main military danger for the Bulgarian army, while the reinforced Second Army had to push the Greek army out of Thessaloniki. The plan relied on the speed of the action to take out Serbia and Greece before Romania and the Ottoman Empire could intervene, which he presumed would not dare to go to war against a victorious Bulgaria.

=== Start of the War ===
After the 10-day ultimatum made by General Savov to the government over whether the army would go to war or demobilise had expired, Tsar Ferdinand authorized General Savov to begin a limited military “demonstration”, whose aims were to raise Bulgarian morale, assist the government in its complicated political situation by pressuring Russia, which did not want another Balkan war, to accelerate arbitration and make Serbia and Greece more agreeable through military blows, and seize disputed territory before intervention by the Great Powers. The military demonstration was restricted only to the undisputed zone and involved only the Second and Fourth Armies, which were ordered to push out the Serbian and Greek forces from said area. The Bulgarian headquarters did not intend the operation to develop into an actual war.

The fighting began on the night of 29–30 June. The Bulgarian Fourth Army advanced against the well-prepared Serbian positions. The Bulgarians initially advanced on both flanks and capturied several tactical positions crossed the Zletovska River and, with the capture of Udovo and Gevgelija, severed communications between the Serbian and Greek armies. On 1 July, the Council of Ministers ordered Bulgarian operations to stop. Savov, on the orders of the government, ordered the Fourth Army to stop, while Ferdinand pressed for the attack to continue, showcasing the divide in the Bulgarian government.

=== Command of the United Fourth and Fifth Armies ===
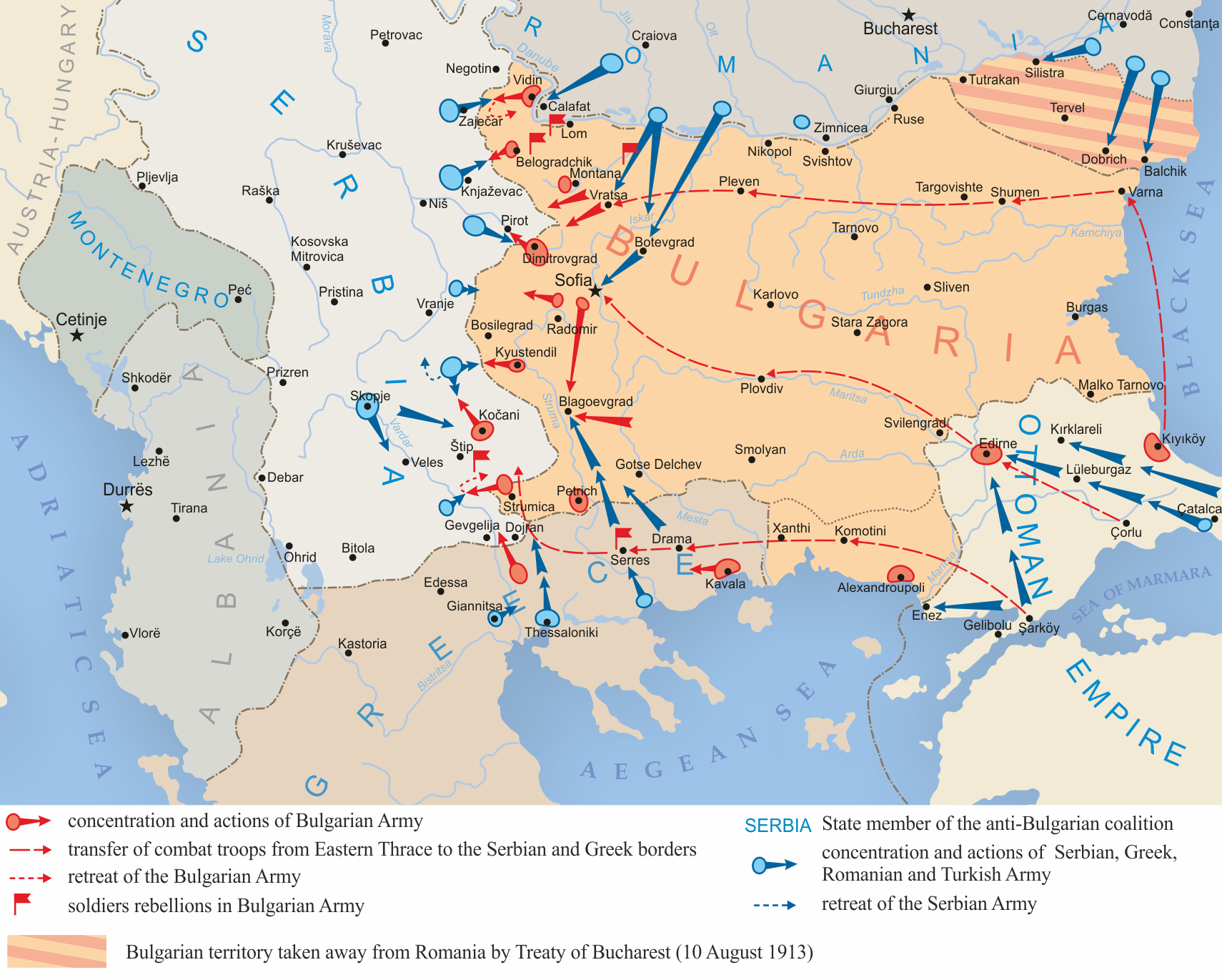
Military operations of the Second Balkan War

On 12 July, General Savov assumed command of the united 4th and 5th Armies and ordered them to continue holding their positions, while preparing for a possible withdrawal to new defensive line around Konyovo. Bulgarian ammunition supplies were becoming severely depleted, averaging about 300 shells per gun. He also increased reconnaissance to gain a better understanding of the Serbian plans and suspected Serbian forces were preparing a wide maneuver against the Bulgarian 4th and 2nd Armies, thus he ordered the restoration of combat effectiveness in the 4th Army. General Savov correctly assumed that the Serbian army planned to pin his attention on the right flank of the 4th Army while the Greek army attacked its left flank and Serbian forces pressured the 5th Army north of the 4th. By the evening the 4th Army repelled all Serbian-Montenegrin assaults. General Savov, encouraged by this defensive success, ordered the 5th Army to advance toward Sultan Tepe.

On 20 July, the advance of the Greek army exposed the rear of the 4th Bulgarian Army. General Savov ordered that the left wing of the 4th Army had to hold to the end; otherwise the position would become critical. However Savov remained composed and still believed the situation could be salvaged with the 4th Army holding a defensive posture, while the 5th Army attacked the Serbs and a possible encirclement of the Greeks in the Kresna Gorge. Later, on 22 July, the armies of Serbia and Greece were trying to envelop and encircle the Bulgarian 2nd, 4th, and 5th Armies, but those plans were uncovered by General Savov. General Savov ordered the recovery lost positions to the Greeks and to hold of them until reinforcements arrived, after which he intended to attack the Greeks with the left wing of the 4th Army and inflict upon them a decisive defeat. By 24 July, Serbian and Montenegrin troops were still repeatedly attacking the 4th Army at the Kalimanci but could not break through the Bulgarian positions.

=== Later life ===
In the next years Mihail Savov lived in France. After the First World War he became Minister Phenipotentiary in France (1920–1923) and Belgium (1922–1923).

Lieutenant General Mihail Savov died on 21 July 1928 in Saint-Vallier-de-Thiey in France and was buried on 18 August in Sofia.

== Awards ==
- Order of Bravery, II grade; III grade
- Order of St Alexander, I and II grade with brilliants
- Order of Military Merit, I grade
- Order of Stara Planina, 1st grade with swords - awarded posthumously on 20 December 2012

== Sources ==
- Dinev, Angel (2012). Vidni starozagortsi, komandvali balgarskata armiya prez Balkanskite voyni (1912–1913 g.) [Prominent People of Stara Zagora Who Commanded the Bulgarian Army during the Balkan Wars (1912–1913)] (in Bulgarian). Stara Zagora. ISBN 978-954-9411-20-1.
- Hall, Richard C. (2000). The Balkan Wars, 1912–1913: Prelude to the First World War. Routledge. ISBN 0-415-22946-4.
- Borodziej, Włodzimierz; Górny, Maciej (2021). Forgotten Wars: Central and Eastern Europe, 1912–1916. Translated by Tilbury, Jasper. Cambridge: Cambridge University Press. ISBN 978-1-108-83715-6.
- Markov, Georgi (2012). Balgariya v Balkanskiya sayuz sreshtu Osmanskata imperiya, 1911–1913 [Bulgaria in the Balkan League against the Ottoman Empire, 1911–1913] (in Bulgarian). Sofia: Zahariy Stoyanov. ISBN 978-954-09-0725-3.
- Markov, Georgi (2017). Balgarskoto krushenie 1913 [The Bulgarian Catastrophe 1913] (in Bulgarian). Sofia: Zahariy Stoyanov. ISBN 978-954-09-1166-3.
- Nedev, S. (1993). Komandvaneto na balgarskata voyska prez voynite za natsionalno obedinenie [The Command of the Bulgarian Army During the Wars for National Unification] (in Bulgarian). Sofia: Voennoizdatelski kompleks "Sv. Georgi Pobedonosets".
- Dimitrov, I. (1985). Saedinenieto 1885 - entsiklopedichen spravochnik [The Unification of 1885 - Encyclopedic Reference Book] (in Bulgarian). Sofia: Darzhavno izdatelstvo "Dr. Petar Beron".

Political offices
Preceded by Sava Mutkurov	Minister of War of Bulgaria; 16 February 1891 – 27 April 1894	Succeeded by Racho Petrov
Political offices
Preceded by Stefan Paprikov	Minister of War of Bulgaria; 31 March 1903 – 4 May 1907	Succeeded by Danail Nikolaev
