= Order of Saint Alexander =

Bulgarian order during the Kingdom of Bulgaria

Royal Order of Saint Alexander Царски орден на свети Александър
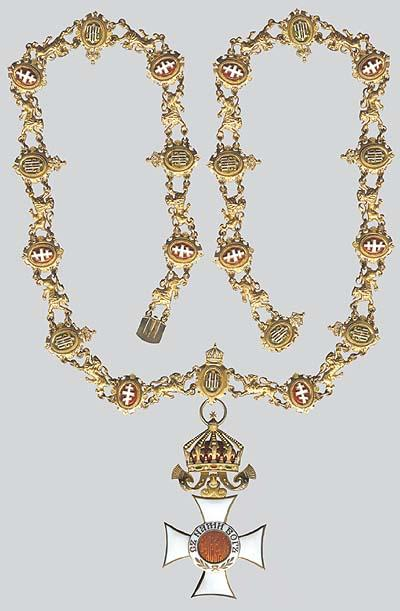
- Collar of the Order

Awarded by The King of the Bulgarians
- Type: Dynastic Order
- Royal house: House of Saxe-Coburg-Gotha-Koháry
- Religious affiliation: Bulgarian Orthodox
- Ribbon: Red
- Eligibility: Bulgarian and Foreign citizens
- Awarded for: Awarded with the personal benevolence of the monarch
- Status: Currently constituted, rarely granted
- Grand Master: King Simeon II
- Grades: Knight Grand Cross with Collar; Knight/Dame Grand Cross with Chain; Knight/Dame Grand Cross; Knight/Dame Grand Officer; Knight/Dame Commander; Knight/Dame Officer; Knight/Dame; Silver Cross

Precedence
- Next (higher): Royal Order of Saints Cyril and Methodius
- Next (lower): Royal Order of Bravery
- The ribbon of the Order

The Order of St Alexander (Bulgarian: Орден "Свети Александър") was the second highest Bulgarian order during the Kingdom of Bulgaria. It was established by Knyaz Alexander I and named after his patron saint (Alexander Nevsky).

== History ==
The order was established with a decree on 25 December 1881, in honour of the patron saint of Alexander Battenberg. Initially it was planned to have five grades and a Necklace but subsequently four grades and Grand and Lesser Necklace were formed and in 1908 a Grand Cross was added. With time wartime grades with swords in the middle and above the cross were added. The order was awarded to Bulgarian and foreign citizens with the personal benevolence of the Bulgarian monarch, who was the Grand Master.

== Description ==
The order had a white enamelled cross pattée with golden or silver edges according to the grade. On the pendant of the obverse there was a stylized inscription with the name of the order and on the surrounding ring there was the motto СЪ НАМИ БОГЪ (God with us) with laurel wreaths below. On the reverse there was a white background with inscription 19 ФЕВРАЛЪ 1878 (19 February 1878) - the date of the signing of the Treaty of San Stefano. Atop the cross was a royal crown. The first grade was worn with a crimson moire ribbon over the right shoulder with a rosette in the edge. It had its own eight-ray silver star with the obverse of the order placed in the middle.

The Grand necklace consisted of thirty interconnected medallions with crowned lions, alternated with the monogram of the founder Knyaz Alexander I and eight edges Orthodox cross. There was a special issue with two field marshal's batons which belonged to Tsar Ferdinand.

The Lesser Necklace was similar to the Grand Necklace but in smaller size.

The Grand Cross, established in 1908, was also similar to the initial issue but the cross was enamelled in green and in the middle of the pendant was placed a crowned Bulgarian lion. The star was of similar design with green ring around the crowned lion on red background.

The other grades are like the first issue but smaller in size. The sixth grade was made in silver without enamel over the shoulders of the cross.

The Ottoman sultans Abdul Hamid II and Mehmed V were respectively awarded the Grand and Lesser Necklace of the Order of St Alexander with diamonds. They are currently kept in the collection of the Topkapı Palace in Istanbul.

== Grades ==
- Great Cross of the Order of St Alexander, Grand and Lesser Necklace
- I grade, Grand Cross. Awarded to senior state officers and military personnel. It was worn with a scarf over the shoulder.
- II grade, Grand Officer Cross. The cross was with white enamel, it was worn with red ribbon and had a star.
- III grade, Commander Cross. The cross was with white or green enamel (according to the emission), it was worn with red ribbon and had no star.
- IV grade, Officer Cross. The cross was with white enamel, it was worn on the chest with triangle red ribbon with rosette, it had no star.
- V grade, Officer Cross. The cross was with white enamel, it was worn on the chest with triangle red ribbon, it had no star.
- VI grade, Silver Cross. The cross was made of silver with no enamel, it was worn on the chest with triangle red ribbon, it had no star.

== Notable recipients ==
I grade, Grand Cross

- Abdul Hamid II
- Giacomo Acerbo
- Duke Adolf Friedrich of Mecklenburg
- Alois Lexa von Aehrenthal
- Albert I of Belgium
- Albert, 8th Prince of Thurn and Taxis
- Alexander I of Yugoslavia
- Alexander of Battenberg
- Prince Alexander of Hesse and by Rhine
- Duke Alexander of Oldenburg
- Alfred, 2nd Prince of Montenuovo
- Grand Duke Andrei Vladimirovich of Russia
- Mustafa Kemal Atatürk
- Prince August Leopold of Saxe-Coburg and Gotha
- Theodor Avellan
- Friedrich von Beck-Rzikowsky
- Leopold Berchtold
- Victor, Prince Napoléon
- Boris III of Bulgaria
- Kiril Botev
- Walther von Brauchitsch
- Bernhard von Bülow
- Prince Carl, Duke of Västergötland
- Charlotte of Schaumburg-Lippe
- Constantine I of Greece
- Duke Constantine Petrovich of Oldenburg
- Théophile Delcassé
- Radko Dimitriev
- Grand Duke Dmitry Konstantinovich of Russia
- Elena of Montenegro
- Eleonore Reuss of Köstritz
- Ernest Louis, Grand Duke of Hesse
- Ernst Gunther, Duke of Schleswig-Holstein
- Ernst II, Duke of Saxe-Altenburg
- Ferdinand I of Bulgaria
- Ferdinand I of Romania
- Prince Francis Joseph of Battenberg
- Frederick VIII of Denmark
- Frederick Francis III, Grand Duke of Mecklenburg-Schwerin
- Frederick Francis IV, Grand Duke of Mecklenburg-Schwerin
- Pietro Gazzera
- Prince Georg of Bavaria
- Giovanna of Italy
- Agenor Maria Gołuchowski
- Sergey Gorshkov
- Wilhelm von Hahnke
- Ulrich von Hassell
- Prince Henry of Prussia (1862–1929)
- Prince Henry of Battenberg
- Duke Henry of Mecklenburg-Schwerin
- Paul von Hindenburg
- Prince Konrad of Hohenlohe-Schillingsfürst
- Dietrich von Hülsen-Haeseler
- Nikola Ivanov
- Duke John Albert of Mecklenburg
- Archduke Joseph August of Austria
- Archduke Joseph Karl of Austria
- Karl August, 10th Prince of Thurn and Taxis
- Gustav von Kessel
- Stiliyan Kovachev
- Hermann Kövess von Kövessháza
- Prince Kuni Kuniyoshi
- Aleksey Kuropatkin
- Vasil Kutinchev
- Kyril, Prince of Preslav
- Velizar Lazarov
- Archduke Leopold Ferdinand of Austria
- Archduke Leopold Salvator of Austria
- Émile Loubet
- Louis IV, Grand Duke of Hesse
- Prince Louis of Battenberg
- August von Mackensen
- Maria of Yugoslavia
- Princess Marie Louise of Bourbon-Parma
- Prince Maximilian of Baden
- Grand Duke Michael Mikhailovich of Russia
- Milan I of Serbia
- Jovan Mišković
- Helmuth von Moltke the Younger
- Sergey Biryuzov
- Benito Mussolini
- Sava Mutkurov
- Nicholas II of Russia
- Prince Nicholas of Romania
- Danail Nikolaev
- Prince Paul of Yugoslavia
- Prince Pedro Augusto of Saxe-Coburg and Gotha
- Racho Petrov
- Philipp, Landgrave of Hesse
- Prince Philippe, Duke of Orléans (1869–1926)
- Hans Heinrich XV, Prince of Pless
- Hans von Plessen
- Erich Raeder
- Prince Rudolf of Liechtenstein
- Mihail Savov
- Margarita Saxe-Coburg-Gotha
- Grand Duke Sergei Alexandrovich of Russia
- Grand Duke Sergei Mikhailovich of Russia
- Duke Siegfried August in Bavaria
- Zahari Stoyanov
- Alfred von Tirpitz
- Georgi Todorov (general)
- Stefan Toshev
- Stefan Tsanev
- Umberto II of Italy
- Prince Valdemar of Denmark
- Illarion Vorontsov-Dashkov
- Prince Waldemar of Prussia (1889–1945)
- Wilhelm II, German Emperor
- Wilhelm, German Crown Prince
- William Ernest, Grand Duke of Saxe-Weimar-Eisenach
- William, Prince of Hohenzollern
- Sergei Witte
- Nikola Zhekov
- Arthur Zimmermann
- August zu Eulenburg

II grade, Grand Officer Cross

- Kliment Boyadzhiev
- Cevat Çobanlı
- Ivan Fichev
- Julius Ringel
- Ferdinand Schörner
- Konstantin Zhostov

III grade, Commander Cross

- Rolf Andvord
- Wladimir Giesl von Gieslingen
- Panteley Kiselov
- Ivan Kolev (general)
- Konstantin Lukash
- Hristo Lukov
- Aleksandar Protogerov
- Vladimir Sukhomlinov
- Ivan Valkov

IV or V grade, Officer Cross

- Petar Darvingov
- Heinrich Jacobi (archaeologist)
- Stefan Nerezov
- Rudolf Toussaint
- Damyan Velchev
- Pencho Zlatev

VI grade, Silver Cross
Unknown Grades

- Michail Arnaudov
- Hans Baur
- Friedrich von Boetticher
- Georgi Bogdanov
- Michael von Faulhaber
- Friedrich von Georgi
- Hristo Matov
- Hans Michahelles
- Igor Moiseyev
- Stevan Mokranjac
- Dumitru C. Moruzi
- Eberhard Graf von Schmettow
- Simeon Saxe-Coburg-Gotha
- Vladimir Vazov

== Sources ==
- „Каталог Български ордени и медали“. Веселин Денков
- „Българските ордени и медали 1878 - 2002“. Тодор Петров
- „Ордени и медали в България“. 1998 Тодор Петров
- „Българска Енциклопедия от А-Я“. 2005 Авторски колектив към БАН
