= Georgi Vazov =

Bulgarian militiaman (1863–1934)

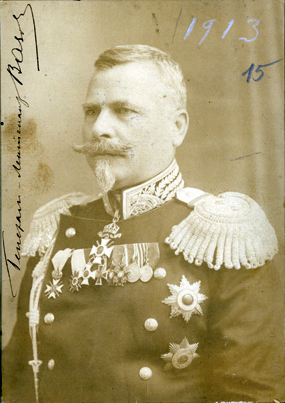
- Lieutenant General Georgi Vazov in a parade uniform.
- Born: January 5, 1860; Sopot, Eyalet of Adrianople, Ottoman Empire
- Died: August 13, 1934 (aged 74); Sofia, Sofia City Province, Bulgaria
- Burial place: Central Sofia Cemetery, Sofia, Bulgaria
- Military career
- Allegiance: Principality of Bulgaria; Kingdom of Bulgaria
- Branch: Bulgarian Land Forces
- Service years: 1880–1913
- Rank: Lieutenant General
- Conflicts: Serbo-Bulgarian War; Battle of Tsaribrod; First Balkan War; Bulgarian front; Siege of Adrianople; Second Balkan War
- Awards: Order of Bravery, III and IV degree, 2nd class Order of St. Alexander, II degree with swords on top, V degree without swords Order of Military Merit III Degree; Order of Saint Stanislaus III degree Order of Saint Vladimir IV degree Order of Saint Anna, I Degree

Georgi Minchov Vazov (January 5, 1860 – August 13, 1934) was a Bulgarian-Russian militiaman. He was one of the main organizers of the 1886 Bulgarian coup d'état, aimed at the dethronement of Prince Alexander Battenberg. During the First Balkan War, he commanded the Eastern Sector during the Siege of Adrianople, where the offensive that led to the capture of the city took place.

== Biography ==
Georgi Vazov was born on January 5, 1860, in Sopot. He is the 5th child in the family of merchant Mincho Vazov and Saba Hadjinikolova-Vazova. He is the brother of the writer Ivan Vazov, the doctor Kiril Vazov, lieutenant general Vladimir Vazov, politician Boris Vazov. He is the father of the director Alexander Vazov and the uncle of the politician Ivan Vazov.

Vazov grew up in a relatively wealthy family. His father Mincho Vazov is a major merchant and entrepreneur, owner of some of the largest shops in the center of Sopot, trading in Wallachia. In 1866, the eldest brother of the Ivan family took young Georgi to the "mutual school" in Klisura with teacher Nacho Trufchev. Georgi Vazov reflects about the school as he comments:

...The ward was located on the lower floor of the school. It was a large room with desks, where a hundred children studied...

In 1873 he graduated from the mutual school in his hometown, but due to the health problems his father had, he had to work in his fathers shop. In the autumn of 1874 he entered the 3rd high school class of the Aprilov High School in Gabrovo, but in 1876 due to a riot that he participated in, he was expelled from the high school and returned to Sopot. Sopot did not revolt during the April Uprising of 1876, but nevertheless the people of Sopot witnessed the atrocities of the Bashi-bazouk.

After the suppression of the uprising in the autumn of the same year, Mincho Vazov decided to send his son Georgi to Oltenitza, Romania, to his brother Kiril. He stayed there for a year and studied at the Bulgarian school there.

=== Russo-Turkish War (1877–1878) ===
During the Russo-Turkish War of 1877–1878, Georgi Vazov worked as a clerk in the Russian administration in Svishtov.

=== After the liberation (1878–1884) ===
In the spring of 1878, under the leadership of the governor of Svishtov, Naiden Gerov, a competition was held, thanks to which 10 boys had the opportunity to study at the Odessa Junker School in Russia. One of the ten lucky ones is Georgi Vazov. At the beginning of May, the group was assembled and the future cadets are preparing to leave for Odessa. They arrived there in June and began their three-month preparation for the entrance exams at the Military School. His military training passed as a "volunteer" in the 55th Podolsk Regiment of the Odessa garrison. Vazov passed his exam on September 1, 1878, and after being admitted he was enlisted in the 2nd Junker Company. He showed special inclinations towards military tactics and artillery. He completed his studies on September 1, 1880, with the rank of senior cadet and returned to Bulgaria.

Upon his arrival in Varna, he was promoted to the rank of lieutenant, which equated him with the graduation of the second class of the Vasil Levski National Military University in Sofia. On October 8, 1880, Lieutenant Vazov in the 1st Company of Alexander of Battenberg with the position of subattler officer in the 2nd Company, and on September 9, 1881, he was appointed head of the garrison warehouse. The young officer did not like the position and with the help of his brother Ivan Vazov, who at that time resided in the capital of Eastern Rumelia, Plovdiv on November 26 of the same year he was transferred to the East Rumelia militia.

In Plovdiv, Georgi Vazov was appointed on December 11, 1881, again as a subattler officer in the 1st Plovdiv Company. Vazov's diligence and intelligence did not go unnoticed by the district 's governor-general, Aleko Bogoridi, and he was appointed his third adjutant. Georgi Vazov became part of Prince Bogoridi's retinue at his meeting with the Sultan in Constantinople in 1882.

As an East Rumelia officer, on November 2, 1882, Lieutenant Vazov left for St. Petersburg, where he initially studied at the Engineering School, and on November 2, 1883, he continued his education in the junior class of the Nikolaev Military Academy, after successfully passing the exams. From the first year, on November 20, 1884, he was transferred to the senior class. As early as 1881, Vazov wrote his first monograph "On Military Gymnastics in Schools and Society", which was published in Sofia during his studies in Russia. On September 10, 1885, Vazov returned to Bulgaria to take part in the Serbo-Bulgarian War.

=== Serbo-Bulgarian War ===
During the Serbo-Bulgarian War, Vazov performed various functions in the Pioneer Company and the artillery. He joined the avant-garde detachment of Major Petko Stoyanov and took part in the Battle of Tsaribrod on November 12. Conducts reconnaissance in the rear of the enemy, capturing enemy soldiers on ( November 14 * ). He was awarded the Order of Bravery, IV degree.

After the war, water course fortification in the Military School in Sofia. In 1886, he was among the leaders of the 1886 Bulgarian coup d'état aimed at the dethronement of Prince Alexander I Battenberg, and after the counter coup he emigrated to Russia. In 1888, he graduated from the Nikolaev Military Engineering Academy, after which he remained in the service of the Russian army. Under his leadership, the Kushka fortress in Central Asia was rebuilt .

After the thawing of Bulgarian-Russian relations in the late 90s, in 1898 Georgi Vazov was returned to service in the Bulgarian Army. From 1899 to 1900, he worked in the Military Engineering Inspectorate, then he was commander of the 2nd Pioneer Company (1900-1903), chief of the engineering troops (1904-1905) and inspector of the engineering troops (1908). In 1906 he was promoted to the rank of Major General . He was later accused of corruption in the supply of explosives and in May 1908 was dismissed from the army.

=== The Balkan Wars ===
At the beginning of the First Balkan War in the autumn of 1912, Georgi Vazov was mobilized and appointed chief of military communications and transport. On November 22, he became military governor of Lozengrad, and from February 1, he was chief of the Eastern Sector at Edirne, who also led during the Siege of Adrianople two months later, during which Edirne was captured. The first forts of Aivazbaba, Aijiolu and others were captured on his section . Participates in the capture of Shukri Pasha . For his participation in the war, General Vazov was awarded the Order of St. Alexander, II degree, which was awarded to him on June 25, 1913, in the Ministry of War.

On March 12, 1913, at 8:30 a.m., Major General Georgi Vazov, commander of the Bulgarian troops besieging Edirne in the eastern sector, issued his remarkable order No. 2887 to attack and capture the forts of the fortress. Point 6 of it has remained in history, it reads:

It must be remembered that on this night it is necessary to decide the fate of the Edirne fortress.

There is no going back! The enemy must be broken!

Glory and peace await us if we go forward, dishonor and death - if we turn back!

After the beginning of the Second Balkan War, Georgi Vazov was appointed Minister of War in the government of Stoyan Danev and in the government of Vasil Radoslavov and was promoted to lieutenant general. He resigned due to political differences and resigned from the army.

=== Public and Political Activity ===
In September 1914, he was accepted as a member of the "Slavic Society", founded in 1899 by Bulgarian citizens to celebrate Slavdom and in particular to celebrate Russia and other countries that helped the Liberation of Bulgaria. He worked together with prominent Russian intellectuals to improve Russian-Bulgarian relations. On March 15, 1915, 115 members of the People's Party, including General Vazov, sent a letter requesting that Bulgaria not interfere in the First World War.

On May 12, 1915, he was elected municipal councilor in Sofia, a position he held until 1919.

On September 10, 1915, in the Sofia Military Club, the reserve general Vazov, in his capacity as chairman of the Sofia bureau of the People's Party, gathered all the chairmen of the opposition parties. There is a telegram to the government, in which the importance of Bulgaria's non-interference in the First World War is emphasized, or if such intervention is necessary, Bulgaria should side with Russia. The telegram was presented by Aleksandar Stamboliyski at an audience with Ferdinand, but he flatly rejected this course of action.

In 1920, his health deteriorated and he was forced to go to Vienna for treatment at the end of the year. His illness necessitated a complex surgical operation, which was performed in February 1922. His rehabilitation lasted almost two years, which he spent in sanatoriums in Switzerland, Germany and Italy. In 1922 he wrote his Memoirs of the Balkan War in Geneva.

Georgi Vazov returned to Bulgaria on May 24, 1924, and 4 days later the leadership of the volunteer "Edirne Society" organized a celebration in his honor, at which he was officially accepted as a member of the society. A survey conducted in 1926 by the Ministry of Defense shows that Vazov devoted himself to his work on historical and memoir works. At that time the manuscripts of the "Monograph on the Participation of the Bulgarians in the Liberation War", "Memories of the Union and the Serbo-Bulgarian War", "Strengthening the Northern Border of Bulgaria" and "The Bulgarian Flotilla" were ready. In 1919, General Vazov published his memoirs "In the Deserts of Central Asia". General Vazov is the author of dozens of articles in the field of military affairs.

Lieutenant General Georgi Vazov died on August 13, 1934, in Sofia. His remains were transported on a gun carriage as was the custom for a burial of a military hero. He was buried in the Central Sofia Cemetery to the sounds of mourning military music.

== Bibliography ==
- Vazov, Georgi (1884). About military gymnastics in schools and in society.
- Vazov, Georgi (1902). Our army and its budget.
- Vazov, Georgi (1909). Short guide for action against fortresses and their attack.
- Vazov, Georgi (1926). Memories of the Balkan War.
- Vazov, Georgi (1929). Memories of the Balkan Wars. History of a 55-day ministry.
- Vazov, Georgi (1938). In the deserts of Central Asia.
- Vazov, Georgi. Monograph on the participation of Bulgarians in the Liberation War.
- Vazov, Georgi. Memories of the Union and the Serbo-Bulgarian War.
- Vazov, Georgi. Strengthening the northern border of Bulgaria.
- Vazov, Georgi. The Bulgarian Flotilla.
- Rumenin, Rumen. The Officer Corps in Bulgaria 1878 - 1944. Vol. 1 and 2. Sofia, Publishing House of the Ministry of Defense "St. George the Victorious ”, 1996. p. 116.
- Mitev, T., General Georgi Vazov, Sofia, 1983, Military Publishing House
- Karastoyanov, G., General Georgi Vazov, Sofia, 1964, State Military Publishing House
- The compound 1885 - encyclopedic reference book. Sofia: State Publishing House "Dr. Peter Beron". 1985.
- Memories of General Georgi Vazov from the website of the Military Publishing House
- "Georgi Vazov - the winner at Edirne", Lyudmila Gabrovska

Political offices
Preceded by Stiliyan Kovachev	Minister of War of Bulgaria; 11 July 1913 – 4 September 1913	Succeeded by Kliment Boyadzhiev
