= Friedrich von Boetticher =

German general and author (1881–1967)

- Born: 14 October 1881; Berthelsdorf, Kingdom of Saxony, German Empire
- Died: 28 September 1967 (aged 85); Bielefeld, West Germany
- Military career
- Allegiance: German Empire; Weimar Republic; Nazi Germany
- Branch: Royal Saxon Army; Reichswehr; Wehrmacht
- Service years: 1900–1945
- Rank: General der Artillerie
- Wars: World War I; World War II
- Awards: Knight's Cross of the House Order of Hohenzollern; Iron Cross (1914) 2nd and 1st class

Friedrich von Boetticher (14 October 1881 – 28 September 1967) was a German career military officer who served in the armies of the German Empire, the Weimar Republic and Nazi Germany. He was the military attaché to Washington D.C. from 1933 to 1942. For the remainder of the war, he served as a department head at the German armed forces high command.

== Early life and World War I ==
Boetticher was born in 1881 at Berthelsdorf in the Kingdom of Saxony, and entered the Royal Saxon Army as an officer cadet in 1900. He participated in World War I chiefly as a staff officer, including assignment as a general staff officer in the Kingdom of Bulgaria, then Germany's ally. He also served on the staff of Generalfeldmarschall Paul von Hindenburg. At the end of the war, he was a Major, the chief German General Staff officer to the 241st Infantry Division and had received numerous war decorations.

== Interwar period and World War II ==
Boetticher remained in the post-war Reichswehr, chiefly serving in staff positions, including the command of the military training academy at Jüterbog. He was promoted to Generalmajor in October 1931, Generalleutnant in October 1933 and General der Artillerie in September 1940. From April 1933 until America's entry into the war, he served as the military attaché to the United States at the German embassy in Washington D.C. While serving as attaché, he provided many intelligence reports to Berlin documenting the isolationist movement in the United States, and the state of military preparedness before Pearl Harbor.

Returning to Germany in June 1942, Boetticher was assigned to the Oberkommando des Heeres (OKH – the army high command) until December. At that time, he was appointed as the chief of the central department at the Oberkommando der Wehrmacht (OKW – the armed forces high command). a post that he retained until Germany's defeat in May 1945. He remained in captivity as a prisoner of war until 1947.

== Awards and decorations ==
- Knight's Cross of the House Order of Hohenzollern with swords
- Iron Cross (1914) 2nd and 1st class
- Service Award Cross of Prussia
- Military Merit Order of Bavaria, 4th class with swords
- Knight's Cross of the Military Order of St. Henry
- Knight's Cross 1st class of the Civil Order of Saxony
- Knight's Cross 1st class of the Albert Order with swords and crown
- Knight's Cross 1st class of the Friedrich Order with swords
- Hanseatic Cross of Hamburg
- Military Merit Cross of Austria-Hungary, 3rd class with war decoration
- Order of Osmanieh 4th class with swords
- Liakat Medal in silver
- Gallipoli Star
- Order of Bravery of Bulgaria 4th class, 1st grade
- Officer's Cross of the Order of Saint Alexander of Bulgaria
- Commander's Cross of the Order of Military Merit of Bulgaria
- Honour Cross of the World War 1914/1918
- Knight's Cross of the War Merit Cross with swords (27 May 1942)
- War Merit Cross 2nd and 1st class

== Personal life ==
Friedrich von Boetticher was married to Olga von Wirsing, and the couple had three children: Friedrich Heinrich (who studied law at the University of Königsberg, Adelheid (who studied medicine at the University of Würzburg), and Hildegard.

== Sources ==
- Webb, James Jack (2024). Generals and Admirals of the Third Reich: For Country or Fuehrer. Vol. 1: A–G. Havertown, PA: Casemate Publishers. ISBN 978-1-952-71512-9.
