= Vladimir Vazov =

Bulgarian general

- Владимир Вазов
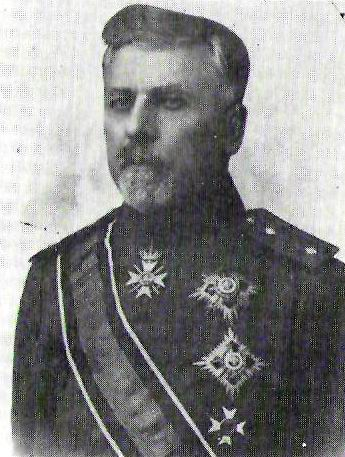
- Born: 14 May 1868; Sopot, Bulgaria
- Died: 20 May 1945 (aged 77); Ribaritsa, Kingdom of Bulgaria
- Burial place: Central Sofia Cemetery
- Education: Vasil Levski National Military University
- Relatives: Ivan Vazov, Georgi Vazov and Boris Vazov (brothers)
- Military career
- Allegiance: Bulgaria
- Branch: Bulgarian Army
- Service years: 1888–1920
- Rank: Lieutenant General
- Commands: 4th Artillery Regiment; 9th Pleven Infantry Division
- Conflicts: First Balkan War; Bulgarian front; Battle of Adrianople; Battle of Kirk Kilisse; Battle of Chataldzha; First World War; Battle of Doiran; Vardar offensive
- Awards: Order of Bravery; Order of St Alexander; Order of Military Merit; Iron Cross; Lyakat Medal
- Other work: Chairman of the Union of Reserve Officers (1920–1921, 1924–1930); Mayor of Sofia (1926–1932)

Vladimir Minchev Vazov (Bulgarian: Владимир Минчев Вазов) (14 May 1868 – 20 May 1945) was a Bulgarian officer. He led the Bulgarian forces during the successful defensive operation at Dojran during the First World War.

== Biography ==
Vladimir Vazov was born on 14 May 1868 to Mincho Vazov and Suba Hadjinikolova. His brothers were the writer Ivan Vazov, the officer Georgi Vazov and the politician Boris Vazov.

In 1886 Vladimir Vazov entered the Military School in Sofia. After he graduated in 1888 he was assigned as a second lieutenant to the 5th artillery regiment in Shumen.

On 18 May 1890 Vladimir was promoted to lieutenant and continued his specialization in Hessen, Germany. On 2 August 1894 he received the rank of captain and in 1896 was transferred to the 4th Artillery Regiment in Sofia and served as the commander of an artillery battery. During 1902 and 1903 he attended Artillery School in Tsarskoye Selo, Russia. In 1904 Vladimir was part of a special Bulgarian delegation which visited France and Germany to assess the capabilities of their newest artillery equipment and choose a supplier for the Bulgarian Army. On 17 February 1906 the minister of war decreed the establishment of a special Artillery School in Sofia and Vladimir Vazov was assigned as its assistant principal. On 31 December 1906 he was promoted to the rank of lieutenant colonel. In 1909 he was the commander of an artillery section in the 4th Artillery Regiment but was soon made a brigade commander.

== Balkan Wars ==
During the First Balkan War Vladimir Vazov served as commander of the 4th Quick-Firing Artillery Regiment of the 1st Sofia Infantry Division. When war was declared on 5 October 1912 some 21 officers and 1168 soldiers were serving in his regiment.

On 9 October Vazov fought around the village of Geçkinli where the Bulgarians defeated the Ottomans despite the latter's sizable numerical advantage. After that he took part in the Battle of Kirk Kilisse and later fought in the First Battle of Çatalca.

During the Second Balkan War Vladimir retained the command of his regiment and participated in the fighting around Tsaribrod, Pirot, Bubliak and Gradoman.

== First World War ==
By August 1915 lieutenant colonel Vazov was serving as commander of the 5th Division's artillery brigade. In October of the same year the division was subordinated to the Bulgarian 2nd Army which was conducting operations against the Serbians in Vardar Macedonia. Here the lieutenant-colonel and his brigade took part in the heavy fighting around the town of Gnjilane, during the Battle of Kosovo. With the final defeat of the Serbian army in November the 5th Division was turned south to face the French forces advancing up the river Vardar. On 28 November Vazov was severely wounded and forced to take leave from active frontal duties during the next several months. Soon afterwards he was promoted to colonel.

In 1916 he was made commander of the 1st Infantry Brigade of the 5th Division and successfully led it in action against Allies during their Autumn Offensive on the Macedonian front.

On 1 March 1917 he took the command of the 9th Pleven Infantry Division which was part of the First Bulgarian Army. Beginning in 1916 the division occupied a stretch of the Macedonian front between the river Vardar and lake Dojran.

As soon as he was appointed he inspected the entire section of the front that was under his command and took measures to strengthen and fortify it. Under his guidance the forces were deployed in order to create a defence in depth.

His efforts to improve the positions were soon tested during the Second Battle of Doiran between 22 and 26 April 1917. Some 86 heavy and 74 field British guns bombarded the line with more than 100,000 shells but caused insignificant damage and the following infantry attack suffered a heavy defeat. In early May, the British resumed their assault but were again defeated and suffered heavy casualties. Following this attack the Bulgarian 34th Troyan Regiment alone buried the bodies of some 2,290 Allied officers and soldiers. Due to his significant contribution for the victory on 20 May 1917, Vladimir Vazov was promoted to major general.

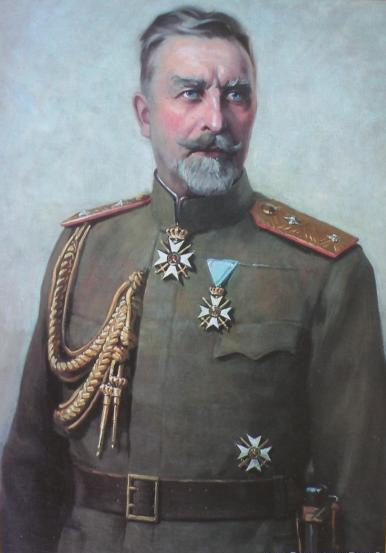
Lieutenant General Vladimir Vazov.

The location of the Doiran Sector was crucial as it represented the shortest possible route to the valley of the Vardar and during the summer of 1918 its defence was expanded to consist of four lines arrayed in depth. Hence it was much better prepared to face an attack than the previous year.

When the Allied Vardar Offensive began, the British and two Greek divisions once again attacked the 9th Pleven Division at Doiran. During this Third Battle of Doiran the Allies once again enjoyed significant advantage in firepower and manpower, being able to bombard the Bulgarian position with over 300,000 ordinary and gas shells. Despite this, the damage to the fortifications was limited and the fighting again resulted in a decisive Bulgarian victory. According to official British sources the Allied losses totalled just over 7,000. Bulgarian sources however, report a figure of over 11,000. The Bulgarian and German commanders on the Macedonian front were not able to fully use the results of the decisive victory at Doiran to their advantage and Bulgaria signed an armistice on 29 September 1918 thus ending its participation in the First World War.

== 1920s and 1930s ==
On 24 February 1920 lieutenant-general Vazov went into the reserve. In 1926 he became mayor of Sofia. During his mandate (until 1932) the fire department was reformed, the electrical network expanded, and the public transport improved. Sofia became one of the “greenest” capitals in Europe.

Among the most notable moments of Vladimir Vazov’s life was his visit to England in 1936. The British legion were celebrating the British victory in World War I. The British veterans invited one of their worthiest opponents on the battlefield Vazov. He was personally greeted by Lord Milne, who shook his hand with the words "It is a pleasure to meet the Bulgarian delegation, as, even though we were enemies, you – like us – fought not only like brave men, but also like gentlemen." The British paid great honour to General Vazov as they lowered their regimental flags in his name. The chairman of the British legion Major Goldy said in his speech: “He is one of the few foreign officers whose name features in our history”.

Lieutenant-General Vladimir Vazov was banished by the communist authorities, from September 9, 1944, to the village of Ribaritsa (near Lovech), where he died in deep poverty on 20th May 1945.

== See also ==
- List of Bulgarian generals in the Kingdom of Bulgaria

== Sources ==
- Vazov, V. (1992). Zhivotopisni belezhki [Biographical Notes] (in Bulgarian). Sofia: Voennoizdatelski kompleks "Sv. Georgi Pobedonosets". ISBN 954-509-002-2.
- Gen. Vladimir Vazov
