= Sultana Racho Petrova =

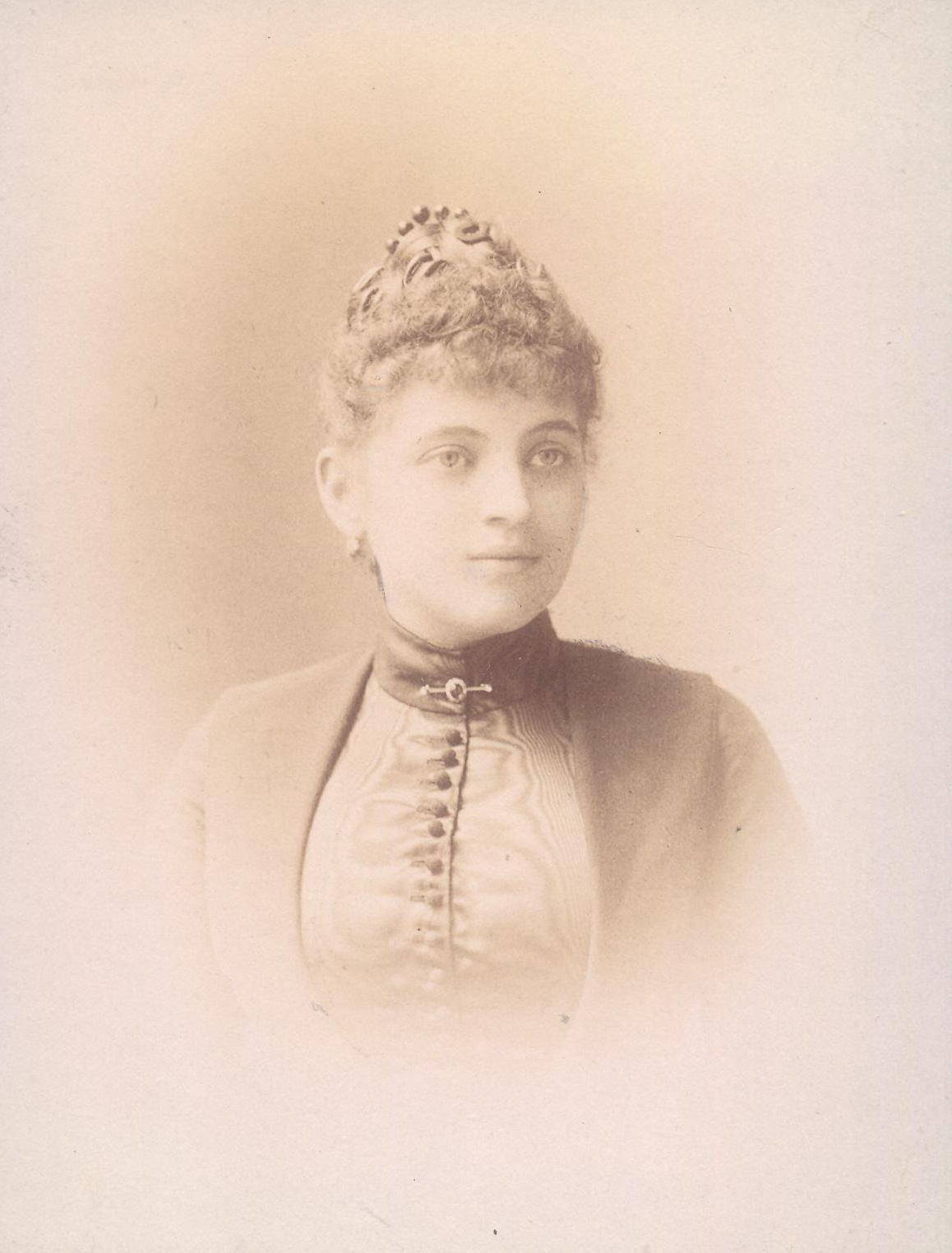
- Born: Sultana Pantaleeva Minchovich; 15 July 1869; Tulcea, Danube Vilayet, Ottoman Empire (now Romania)
- Died: 16 November 1946 (aged 77); Sofia, Bulgaria
- Occupations: writer and memoirist

Sultana Racho Petrova (15 July 1869 – 26 November 1946) was a Bulgarian memoirist.

== Early life and family ==
Sultana Petrova was born Sultana Pantaleeva Minchovich in the Ottoman city of Tulcea, on 15 July 1869, the daughter of Dr. Pantaley Minchovich. Petrova's father studied in Paris, was employed by the Turkish navy and later became a politician. Her mother died when she was 27, leaving her father to raise three children. She was educated in the Royal College of French in Bucharest, capital of the Romanian Old Kingdom. As a young woman, Petrova was noticed by Queen Carmen Sylva who wished to help her to go to Paris to become an opera singer. Her father objects to this, and when Petrova was 16, the family moved to Sofia. At age 24, she met Racho Petrov whom she married in 1887. They had three children, Maria, Vlada and Blagoi. They eventually divorce in 1919.

== Memoirs and legacy ==
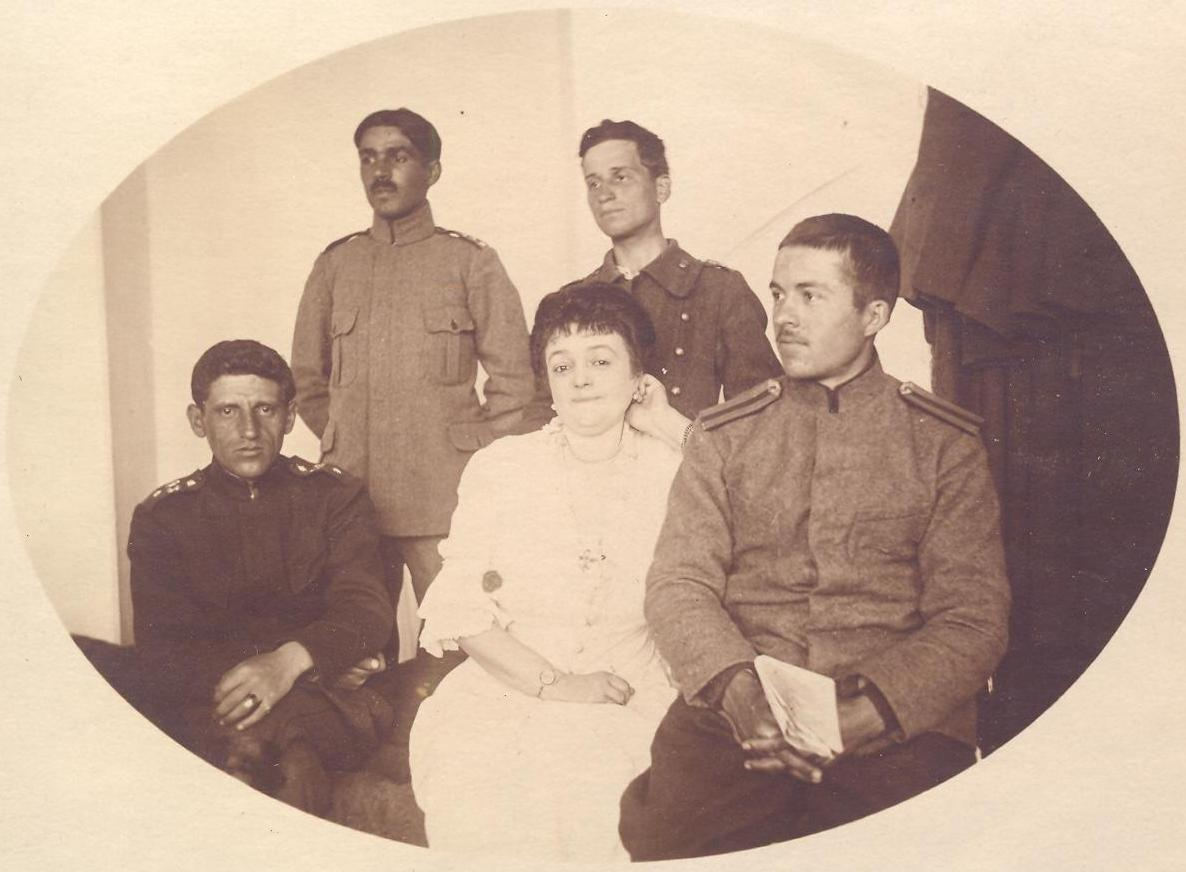
Sultana Racho Petrova in 1913

The marriage was an unhappy one, compounded by an alleged affair which Petrova had with Prince Ferdinand of Bulgaria. She was close to the prince, and was privy to much of the personal affairs and meetings of the prince and Prime Minister Stefan Stambolov. She published her memoirs in 1922, entitled From My Memories, with a second volume being published posthumously. It is her involvement in the Bulgarian government which has led to her memoirs being an important primary source for the time.

During World War II, Petrova was sent to the St. Kirik concentration camp, due to her condemnation of Bulgaria's support of Nazi Germany.

It is also believed that Petrova was the first woman in Bulgaria to undergo plastic surgery. She died in Sofia on 26 November 1946.
