= Konstantin Lukash =

Bulgarian general

Konstantin Ludvig Lukash
- Born: 16 September 1890; Plovdiv, Bulgaria
- Died: March 15, 1945 (aged 54); Sofia, Bulgaria
- Military career
- Allegiance: Kingdom of Bulgaria
- Branch: Bulgarian Army
- Service years: 1909 – 1944
- Rank: Lieutenant General
- Commands: Twenty Second Infantry Division
- Awards: Order of Bravery; Order of St Alexander; Order of Military Merit

Konstantin Ludvig Lukash (Bulgarian: Константин Лудвиг Лукаш; September 16, 1890 in Plovdiv – March 15, 1945) was a Bulgarian officer and Chief of Staff of the Bulgarian Army from 11 August 1941 until the 11 May 1944.

== Biography ==
Lukash was born on 16 September 1890 in Plovdiv, Bulgaria. He successfully applied at the Military School in Sofia. After he graduated on 22 September 1909 he was assigned as lieutenant to a regiment in the 22nd infantry division. On 1 January 1940 he was promoted to Lieutenant General. On 11 August 1941 he became Chief of Staff of the Bulgarian Army until May 11, 1944.

After the Bulgarian coup he was arrested on 21 September 1944, sent to the Soviet Union for interrogation on 2 January 1945, sentenced to death by the People's Court established by the government of the Fatherland Front and executed on 15 March 1945 in Sofia.

== Sources ==
- Oleg Beyda: "Wehrmacht Eastern Tours": Bulgarian Officers on the German-Soviet Front, 1941–1942, in: The Journal of Slavic Military Studies, Vol. 33 (2020), No. 1, pp. 136–161. Available here.
