= Saint-Vallier-de-Thiey =

Commune in Provence-Alpes-Côte d'Azur, France

- Commune
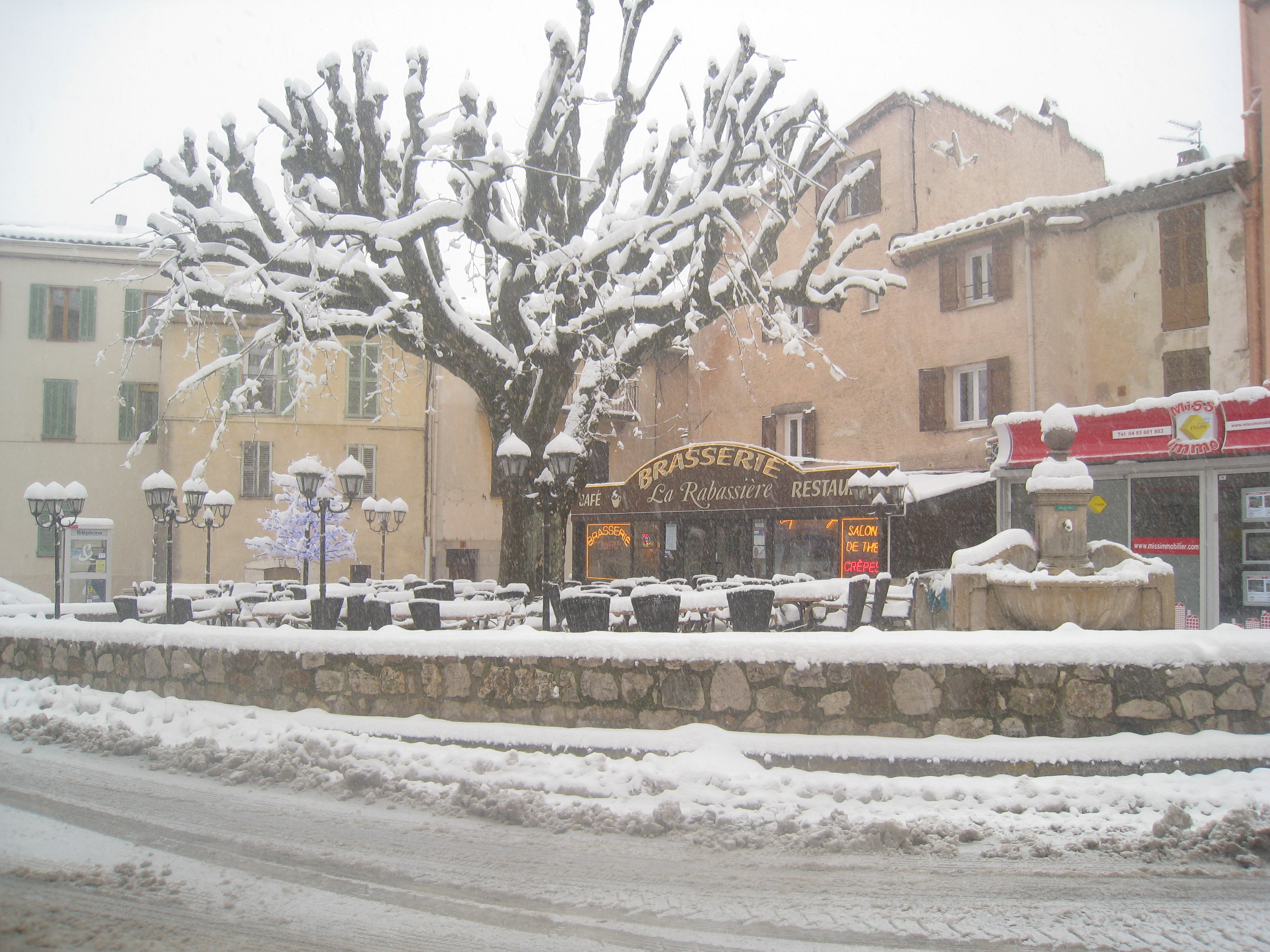
- Saint-Vallier-de-Thiey under snow, in February 2010

- Coat of arms
- Location of Saint-Vallier-de-Thiey
- Location within France Location within Provence-Alpes-Côte d'Azur
- Coordinates: 43°41′59″N 6°50′54″E
- Country: France
- Region: Provence-Alpes-Côte d'Azur
- Department: Alpes-Maritimes
- Arrondissement: Grasse
- Canton: Grasse-1
- Intercommunality: CA Pays de Grasse

Government
  - Mayor (2026–32): Jean-Marc Delia
- Area^{1}: 50.68 km^{2} (19.57 sq mi)
- Elevation: 730 m (2,400 ft)
- Highest elevation: 1,542 m (5,059 ft)
- Lowest elevation: 460 m (1,510 ft)
- Population (2023): 3,658
  - Density: 72.18/km^{2} (186.9/sq mi)
- Demonym: Vallerois
- Time zone: UTC+01:00 (CET)
  - Summer (DST): UTC+02:00 (CEST)
- INSEE/Postal code: 06130 /06460
- ^{1} French Land Register data, which excludes lakes, ponds, glaciers > 1 km^{2} (0.386 sq mi or 247 acres) and river estuaries.

Saint-Vallier-de-Thiey (French pronunciation: [sɛ̃ valje də tjɛ]; Provençal: Sant Valier de Tièir) is a commune in the Alpes-Maritimes department in southeastern France.

== Geography ==
It is located some 12 kilometres northwest of the famed perfume centre of Grasse on the D6085 highway.

Saint-Vallier-de-Thiey and its surrounding area are rich in stone megaliths (particularly great table-shaped stone dolmens) and Bronze Age relics, probably more than anywhere else in the South of France. The most impressive dolmen is called "Verdoline," just south of the village; it may date from as early as 4500 BC and its chamber measures some 1½ X 2 metres (5 X 6½ feet). Near this dolmen is the "Druids' Stone," a rock cylinder created by erosion.

Along the roads from Saint-Vallier-de-Thiey toward Saint-Cézaire-sur-Siagne and going west into the valley of the Siagne River a number of ancient tumuli burial mounds many may be seen.

=== Landforms ===
Saint-Vallier-de-Thiey has woodlands which overhang both environmental and landscaping points of view. These woodlands are classified under L.130-1 of the Town Planning Code.

The main surrounding peaks are:

- Sommet de Thiey (1 553 m)
- Montagne du Cheiron (1 778 m)
- Montagne de l'Audibergue3

=== Hydrography and groundwater ===
The following rivers flow through Saint-Vallier-de-Thiey:

- Siagne,
- Vallon de Nans,
- Vallon de la Combe.
- Vallon de Saint-Christophe.

The village has a purification plant with a capacity of 2500 equivalent-inhabitants.

== Population ==
Historical population
Year	Pop.	±% p.a.
1968	505	—
1975	575	+1.87%
1982	912	+6.81%
1990	1,536	+6.73%
1999	2,261	+4.39%
2007	3,142	+4.20%
2012	3,478	+2.05%
2017	3,594	+0.66%
2023	3,658	+0.29%
Source: INSEE

== Sport ==
Saint-Vallier-de-Thiey is home to the Riviera Cricket Club and Beausoleil Cricket Club.

== See also ==
- Route Napoléon
- Communes of the Alpes-Maritimes department
