= Dimitar Petkov =

Bulgarian politician (1858–1907)

Dimitar Petkov Димитър Петков
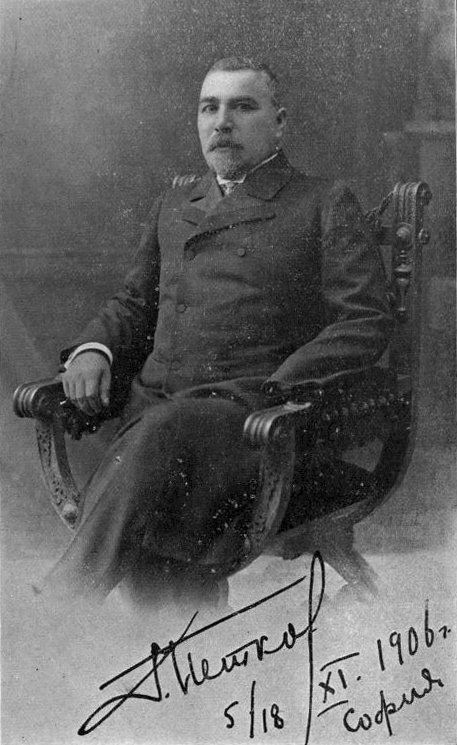

14th Prime Minister of Bulgaria
- In office 6 December 1906 – 11 March 1907
- Monarch: Ferdinand
- Preceded by: Racho Petrov
- Succeeded by: Dimitar Stanchov (Acting)

Personal details
- Born: 2 November 1858 Tulcea, Ottoman Empire (now in Romania)
- Died: 11 March 1907 (aged 48) Sofia, Bulgaria
- Party: People's Liberal Party

Dimitar Nikolov Petkov (Bulgarian: Димитър Петков) (2 November 1858, Tulcea – 11 March 1907, Sofia) was a leading member of the Bulgarian People's Liberal Party and the country's Prime Minister from 5 November 1906 until he was assassinated in Sofia the following year.

A veteran of the Russo-Turkish War of 1877-1878 he fought for the Russian Imperial Army at the Battle of Shipka Pass where he lost an arm during the combat.

Petkov spent five years (1888–1893) as mayor of Sofia and during his time in charge he undertook an extensive redevelopment of the city.

Following the death of Stefan Stambolov in 1895 he took over as leader of People's Liberal Party, a role he held until his own death when Nikola Genadiev succeeded him. Petkov's party took office in 1903 following the resignation of Stoyan Danev but Ferdinand I of Bulgaria chose a non-party Prime Minister, his close friend Racho Petrov, instead of Petkov.

Petkov was finally appointed Prime Minister in November 1906, but held the post for only a few months; on 11 March 1907, he was assassinated by gunshot in Sofia's Tsar Osvoboditel Boulevard by Aleksandar Petrov, a disgruntled former employee of the Bulgarian Agricultural Bank. Petrov was put on trial, handed a death sentence and executed by hanging in July 1907.

His son Nikola Petkov was also a politician in post-war Bulgaria before being put to death in 1947.

Political offices
Preceded by Racho Petrov	Prime Minister of Bulgaria; 1906–1907	Succeeded by Dimitar Stanchov
