= 1886 Bulgarian coup d'état =

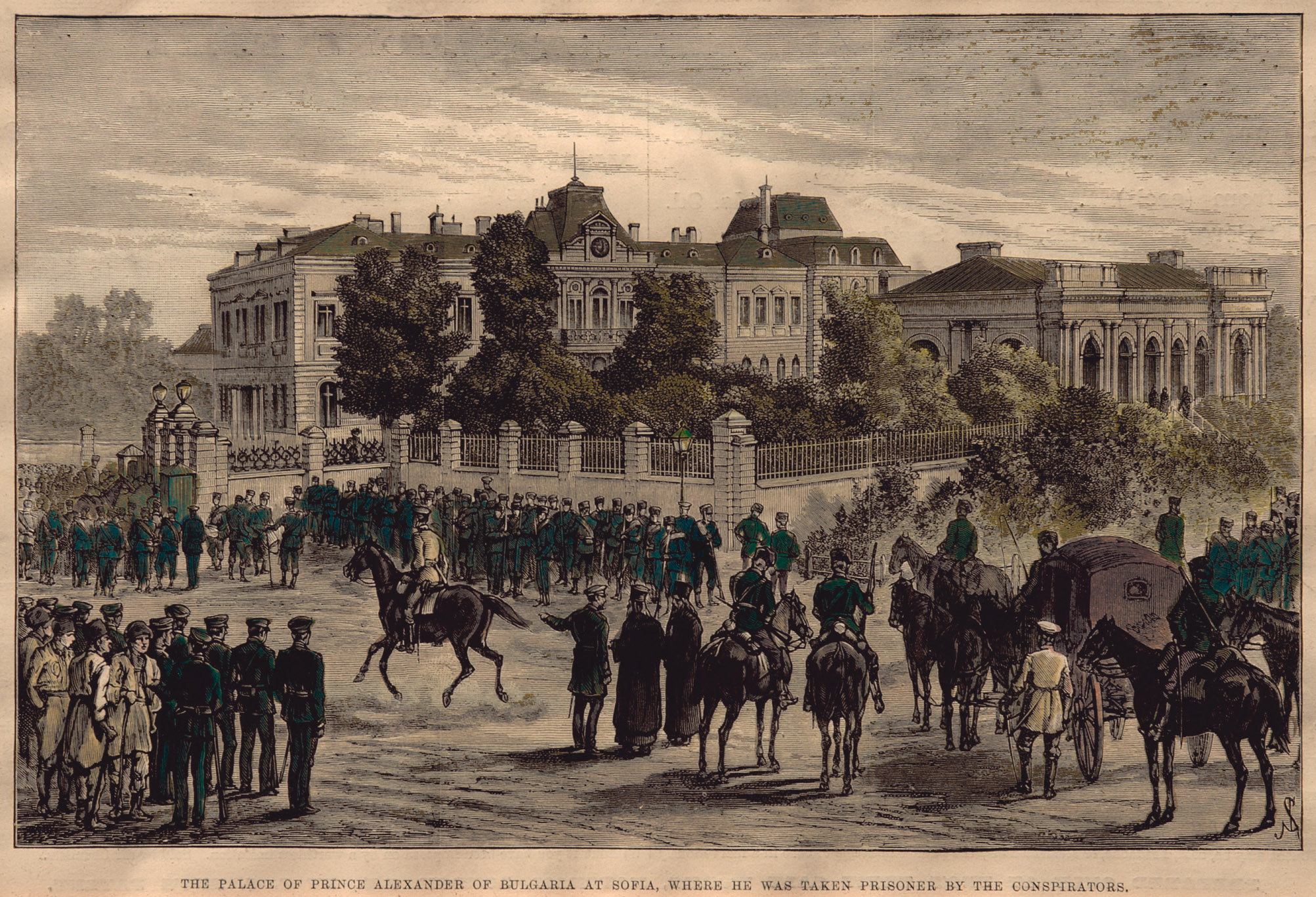
The Royal Palace of Sofia, where Knyaz Alexander was taken prisoner by the conspirators of the 1886 coup

The Bulgarian coup d'état of 1886, also known as the 9 August coup d'état (Bulgarian: Деветоавгустовски преврат, Devetoavgustovski prevrat) was an attempted dethronement of Knyaz Alexander Battenberg in Principality of Bulgaria, carried out on 9 August 1886. Although unsuccessful, the event led to the abdication of Alexander Battenberg.

== Background ==
After the Russo-Turkish War (1877–78) Bulgaria was liberated from Ottoman rule and Knyaz Alexander Battenberg was elected in 1879 as Prince of Bulgaria at the request of the Russian Emperor, his uncle, Alexander II. The latter was assassinated in 1881 and was succeeded by the conservative Alexander III.

The relations between Bulgaria and Russia suffered after the Bulgarian unification with Eastern Rumelia in 1885, which had not been approved by Russia. Prior to the subsequent Serbo-Bulgarian War, Russia had withdrawn Imperial Russian Army officers, who had commanded all larger units of Bulgaria's young army until that point.

Despite the successful unification, the Rusophile circles in the country held Knyaz Alexander Battenberg responsible for the deterioration of relations with Russia. The Rusophiles had valued Russia's role in supporting the restoration of Bulgaria as a state in the boundaries, promised by the preliminary Treaty of San Stefano.

== Coup ==
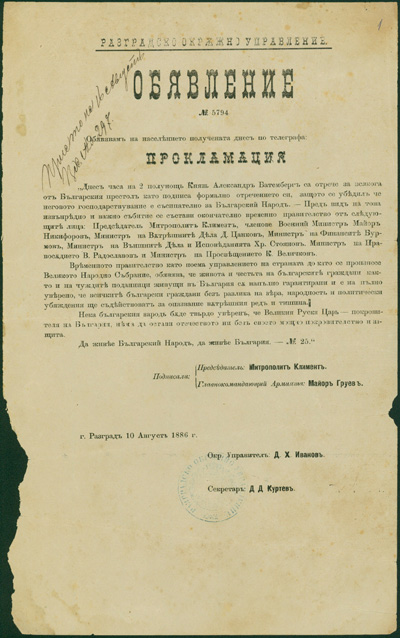
Abdication proclamation of Alexander Battenberg.

On the eve of 8 to 9 August 1886 Alexander Battenberg was arrested in his palace in Sofia, forced to sign a decree for his abdication, and expelled from Bulgaria to Russia by boat. A provisional government was installed, led by Kliment of Tarnovo. However, the coup was not backed by many Bulgarian officers and politicians, including the chief of the National Assembly, Stefan Stambolov. A counter-coup, led by Sava Mutkurov, was organized in Plovdiv and the members of the original coup were quickly isolated. On 17 August 1886, Alexander Battenberg returned to Bulgaria, but his reign lasted only till 26 August 1886, when he abdicated of his own recognizance in an attempt to calm down the crisis in relations with Russia.

== Aftermath ==
The relations between Bulgaria and Russia continued to be hostile in the years following the coup. Bulgaria elected a new Knyaz on 7 July 1887, Ferdinand I of the House of Saxe-Coburg and Gotha, an Austrian Emperor's nephew and an officer in the Austrian army. Bulgaria's domestic political life was dominated during the early years of Ferdinand's reign by liberal party leader Stefan Stambolov, whose foreign policy saw a marked cooling in relations with Russia, formerly seen as Bulgaria's protector.
