= Racho Petrov =

Bulgarian general and politician

Racho Petrov; Рачо Петров
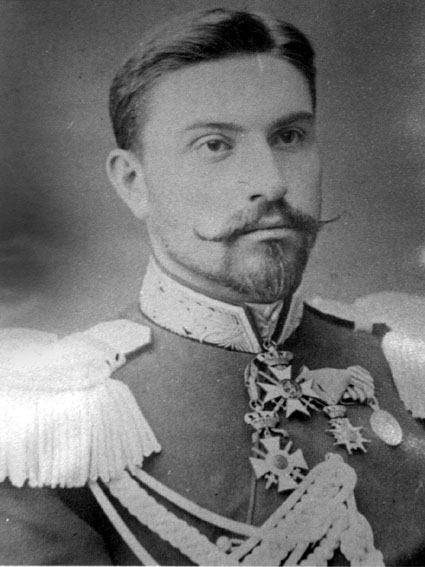

12th Prime Minister of Bulgaria
- In office 25 January 1901 – 5 March 1901
- Monarch: Ferdinand
- Preceded by: Todor Ivanchov
- Succeeded by: Petko Karavelov
- In office 19 May 1903 – 5 November 1906
- Monarch: Ferdinand
- Preceded by: Stoyan Danev
- Succeeded by: Dimitar Petkov

Chief of the General Staff
- In office 9 September 1885 – 29 April 1887
- Monarch: Alexander
- Preceded by: Office Established
- Succeeded by: Stefan Paprikov
- In office 23 October 1887 – 15 April 1894
- Monarch: Ferdinand
- Preceded by: Stefan Paprikov
- Succeeded by: Nikola Ivanov

War Minister
- In office 10 July 1887 – 1 September 1887
- Monarch: Ferdinand
- Preceded by: Danail Nikolaev
- Succeeded by: Sava Mutkurov
- In office 27 April 1894 – 29 November 1896
- Monarch: Ferdinand
- Preceded by: Mihail Savov
- Succeeded by: Nikola Ivanov

Minister of Interior
- In office 10 December 1900 – 4 March 1901
- Monarch: Ferdinand
- Preceded by: Vasil Radoslavov
- Succeeded by: Mihail Sarafov

Minister of Foreign Affairs
- In office 21 January 1901 – 4 March 1901
- Monarch: Ferdinand
- Preceded by: Dimitar Tonchev
- Succeeded by: Stoyan Danev
- In office 18 May 1903 – 4 November 1906
- Monarch: Ferdinand
- Preceded by: Stoyan Danev
- Succeeded by: Dimitar Petkov

Personal details
- Born: 3 March 1861 Shumen, Ottoman Empire
- Died: 22 January 1942 (aged 80) Belovo, Bulgaria

Military service
- Allegiance: Bulgarian Army
- Branch/service: Infantry
- Years of service: 1878–1917
- Rank: General of the Infantry
- Battles/wars: Serbo-Bulgarian War; First Balkan War; Bulgarian front; Second Balkan War; World War I; Balkans Campaign

Racho Petrov Stoyanov (Bulgarian: Рачо Петров Стоянов) (3 March 1861 – 22 January 1942) was a leading Bulgarian general and politician.

Petrov was born in Shumen. A talented soldier, he was appointed Chief of General Staff at the age of 24 and was Minister of Defence at 27. His stature was increased by the leading role he took in suppressing an army mutiny in 1887. He married Sultana Pantaleeva Minchovich in 1887, with whom he had 3 children. After an unhappy marriage, they divorced in 1919.

Both Petrov and his wife were personally close to Tsar Ferdinand I of Bulgaria and in 1891 he was promoted by Ferdinand to the rank of colonel, the first officer to hold that rank in Bulgaria. Petrov also attended Ferdinand's wedding to Princess Marie Louise of Bourbon-Parma in Italy in 1893. Ferdinand's decision in 1894 to place Petrov in charge of the army completely, and thus outside the command of Prime Minister Stefan Stambolov, precipitated the resignation of the latter.

As a politician, he twice served as Prime Minister of Bulgaria, initially as the non-party head of an interim administration in 1901, the only task of which was to organize the next election. He returned as prime minister for a longer period from 1903 to 1906, having been appointed for fear of war after a Bulgarian insurrection in Ottoman Macedonia. His government was particularly concerned with military matters and oversaw an armament program and extensive modernization of the Bulgarian army.

During the Second Balkan War Petrov, by then a Lieutenant General, took command of the 3rd Army, leading it at the Battle of Bregalnica, a Serbian victory.

During the First World War he served as head of the newly established Macedonian Military Inspection Oblast from December 1915 until October 1916.

== See also ==
- List of Bulgarian generals in the Kingdom of Bulgaria

== Notes ==
Political offices
Preceded by Todor Ivanchov	Prime Minister of Bulgaria; 1901	Succeeded by Petko Karavelov
Preceded by Stoyan Danev	Prime Minister of Bulgaria; 1903–1906	Succeeded by Dimitar Petkov
Preceded by Danail Nikolaev	Minister of War; 1887	Succeeded by Sava Mutkurov
Preceded by Mihail Savov	Minister of War; 1894–1896	Succeeded by Nikola Ivanov
Preceded by Vasil Radoslavov	Minister of Interior; 1900–1901	Succeeded by Mihail Sarafov
Preceded by Dimitar Tonchev	Minister of Foreign Affairs; 1901	Succeeded by Stoyan Danev
Preceded by Stoyan Danev	Minister of Foreign Affairs; 1903–1906	Succeeded by Dimitar Petkov
