= Nikola Ivanov =

Bulgarian general and minister of defence

Nikola Ivanov Ivanov
- Никола Иванов Иванов
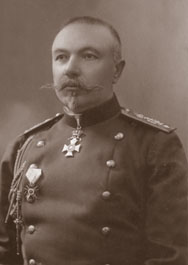

20th Minister of Army of the Principality of Bulgaria
- In office 29 November 1896 – 30 January 1899
- Monarch: Ferdinand I
- Prime Minister: Konstantin Stoilov
- Preceded by: Racho Petrov
- Succeeded by: Stefan Paprikov

Chief of the General Staff of the Bulgarian Land Army
- In office 10 May 1894 – 29 November 1896
- Monarch: Ferdinand I
- Prime Minister: Stefan Stambolov; Konstantin Stoilov
- Minister of Army: Racho Petrov
- Preceded by: Racho Petrov (as Chief of the Ward of Stroevo)
- Succeeded by: Stefan Paprikov (as Headquarter of the Bulgarian Army)

Personal details
- Born: 2 March 1861 Kalofer, Ottoman Empire (today Bulgaria)
- Died: 10 September 1940 (aged 79) Sofia, Bulgaria
- Awards: See below

Military service
- Allegiance: Kingdom of Bulgaria
- Branch/service: Bulgarian Army
- Years of service: 1879–1913
- Rank: General of the Infantry
- Commands: Headquarters of the Army (1894–1896); 4th Preslav Infantry Division (1899–1903); 2nd Thracian Infantry Division (1903–1907); 2nd Army (1912–1913)
- Battles/wars: Russo-Turkish War; Serbo-Bulgarian War; Battle of Pirot; First Balkan War; Bulgarian front; Siege of Adrianople; Second Balkan War; Battle of Kilkis-Lahanas; Battle of Kresna Gorge

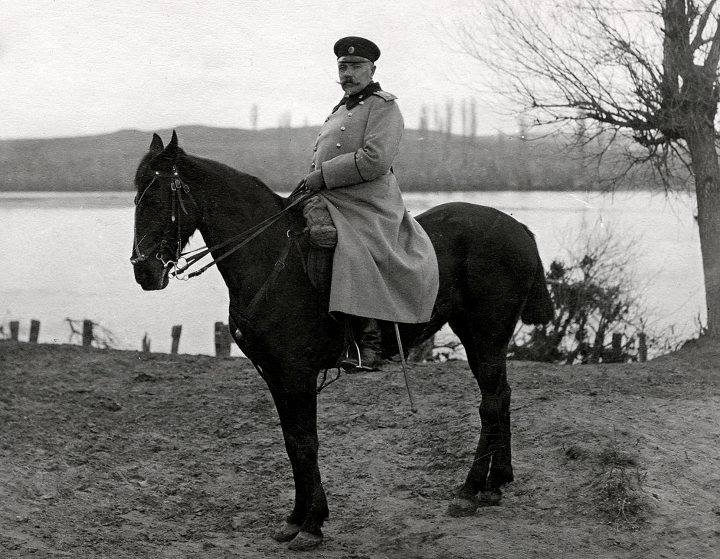
General Nikola Ivanov during the siege of Adrianople

Nikola Ivanov Ivanov (Bulgarian: Никола Иванов Иванов) (2 March 1861, Kalofer – 10 September 1940, Sofia) was a Bulgarian general of the Infantry who played a significant role in Bulgaria's military during the late 19th and early 20th centuries. He served as Chief of the Bulgarian Army's General Staff from 1894 to 1896 and as Minister of War from 1896 to 1899. Ivanov is best known for commanding the Bulgarian Second Army during the Balkan Wars, particularly during the successful Siege of Adrianople in March 1913. He commanded the same Second Army against the Greek Army during the Second Balkan War. After retiring from military service in 1913, he remained active as a military writer and public figure until his death in Sofia in 1940.

== Biography ==
Nikola Ivanov Ivanov was born on 2 March 1861 in Kalofer. He studied in the Aprilov National High School in Gabrovo and then in the Imperial lyceum Galasaray in Istanbul (1875–1877). He participated in the Russo-Turkish War (1877-1878) as a volunteer. After the war he stayed for a short time in Plovdiv before going to the Military School in Sofia in 1878 which he graduated in the next year. On 22 May 1879 he was promoted to lieutenant. In the same year he was appointed in the Eastern Rumelia militia as a junior officer and served in 1st and 2nd Plovdiv Company. On 9 February 1881 he was promoted to first lieutenant.

He participated in the Unification of Bulgaria. On 9 September 1885 he was promoted to captain and with Order No. 4 was appointed for commander of the Tarnovo-Seymen Detachment on the same day.

=== Serbo-Bulgarian War ===
During the Serbo-Bulgarian War in 1885 he worked for the chief of the Central Column of the Western Detachment. He participated in the Battle of Pirot on 14–15 November.

After the war in 1886 he was appointed as Fligel Adjutant of Knyaz Alexander Batenberg and after that as Chief of the Building-Inspection department on the Ministry of Defense. On 1 April 1887 he was promoted to major. In 1888 he was commander of the 10th Infantry Regiment, in 1889 he was chief of staff of the 4th Brigade and in 1890 of the 4th Cavalry Regiment. On 2 August he was promoted to lieutenant colonel. After that he was assistant to the Chief of the Headquarters of the Army (1891–1894) and then Chief of the Headquarters (1894–1896). On 2 August 1895 he was promoted to colonel. Between 17 November and 29 November 1896 he was temporarily in charge of the Ministry of Defense.

Nikola Ivanov was a Minister of Defense in the Government of Konstantin Stoilov (1896–1899), commanded the 4th Preslav Infantry Division (1899–1903) and the 2nd Thracian Infantry Division (1903–1907). On 15 November 1900 he was promoted to major general. From 1907 he was appointed as head of the 2nd Military inspection region.

To celebrate the 25th anniversary of his arrival in Bulgaria, Tsar Ferdinand promoted six major generals to lieutenant general on 2 August 1912, and Ivanov was one of them. This was the first time in the Third Bulgarian Kingdom when that rank was given to active officers.

=== Balkan Wars ===
During the First Balkan War, Nikola Ivanov commanded the 2nd Army between September 1912 and July 1913. He was in charge of the siege and capture of Adrianople.

During the Second Balkan War in 1913, the outnumbered 2nd Army led fierce battles against the whole Greek army and had to retreat after the Battle of Kilkis-Lahanas and later stopped and surrounded the Greeks in the Battle of Kresna Gorge. Ivanov was substituted in the command of the 2nd Army in July 1913 and on 7 August after the cease-fire he resigned from the army.

During the First World War, he remained in the reserve. At that time he acted as a public figure and publicist. He was elected for chairman of the club of the reserve officers in Sofia. On 6 May 1936 he was promoted to General of the Infantry.

General Nikola Ivanov died on 10 September 1940 in Sofia.

== Bibliography ==
- Ivanov, Nikola (1924). The Balkan War 1912-1913 Volume I. Sofia: Pechatnitsa na armeyskiya voenno-izsledovatelski fond.
- Ivanov, Nikola (1925). The Balkan War 1912-1913 Volume II. Sofia: Pechatnitsa na armeyskiya voenno-izsledovatelski fond.

== Awards ==
- Order of Bravery, II grade 2nd class; IV class
- Order of St Alexander, I and II grade with brilliants
- Order of Military Merit, I grade
- Order of Stara Planina, 1st grade with swords - awarded posthumously on 20 December 2012
- Russian Order of St. Anna, 1st and 2nd class with brilliants
- Italian Order of the Crown of Italy, Knight Grand Cross
- German Order of the Prussian Crown, 1st Class
- Austro-Hungarian Order of Franz Joseph, 2nd class
- Ottoman Order of the Medjidieh, 1st class
- Ottoman Order of Osmanieh, 2nd class
- Romanian Order of the Romanian Crown, Grand Officer
- Serbian Order of the Cross of Takovo, 1st class
- Serbian Order of St. Sava, 1st class

== Sources ==
- Hall, R.C. (2002). The Balkan Wars 1912-1913: Prelude to the First World War. Warfare and History. Taylor & Francis. ISBN 978-1-134-58363-8.
- Недев, С., Командването на българската войска през войните за национално обединение, София, 1993, Военноиздателски комплекс „Св. Георги Победоносец“, с. 68-69
- Списание Съвременна пехота, статия Генерал от пехотата Никола Иванов, София, октомври 1940, Изд. Пехотна инспекция, стр. 44, 45
- Ташев, Ташо (1999). Министрите на България 1879-1999. София: АИ „Проф. Марин Дринов“ / Изд. на МО. ISBN 978-954-430-603-8 / ISBN 978-954-509-191-9

Political offices
Preceded by Racho Petrov	Minister of War of Bulgaria; 29 November 1896 – 30 January 1899	Succeeded by Stefan Paprikov
Military offices
Preceded by Racho Petrov	Chief of the General Staff; 10 May 1894–29 November 1896	Succeeded by Stefan Paprikov
