= Sava Mutkurov =

Bulgarian officer, politician

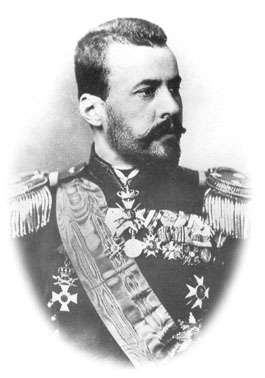
- Sava Mutkurov
- Born: Sava Atanasov Mutkurov; 16 December 1852; Tarnovo, Ottoman Empire (now Bulgaria)
- Died: 15 March 1891 (aged 38); Naples, Kingdom of Italy (now Italy)
- Resting place: Sofia
- Occupations: officer, politician

Sava Atanasov Mutkurov (Bulgarian: Сава Атанасов Муткуров) (16 December [O.S. 4 December] 1852 – 15 March [O.S. 3 March] 1891) was a Bulgarian officer (Major General) and politician. One of only three recipients of the Order of Bravery 1st grade, he was among the chief architects of the Bulgarian unification (1885) and, as an officer in the young Bulgarian Army, one of its defendants in the Serbo–Bulgarian War (1885). He also served as one of the regents of the Principality of Bulgaria after Prince Alexander of Battenberg's abdication (1886–1887) and was Minister of War in Stefan Stambolov's government (1887–1891).

== Early years and Bulgarian unification ==
Sava Mutkurov was born in the city of Tarnovo in the central Danubian Plain (then part of the Ottoman Empire, today in north central Bulgaria) in 1852. He studied for two years at the Military Medical Academy in the imperial capital Constantinople (Istanbul), but graduated instead from the Cadet Infantry School in the Russian city of Odessa in 1872. As a soldier in the Imperial Russian Army, Mutkurov participated in the Serbo–Turkish War of 1876 along with other Bulgarian volunteers. He was also involved in the Russo-Turkish War of 1877–1878 which brought about the Liberation of Bulgaria. During that war, he was the commander of a company in the 54th Minsk Infantry Regiment of the Russian Army.

After the Liberation of Bulgaria and the establishment of the Principality of Bulgaria and Eastern Rumelia in 1878, Mutkurov settled in Eastern Rumelia, where he joined the provincial police or militia. He served first with the 1st Plovdiv Battalion and thereafter with the general staff. As an eminent man of arms in Eastern Rumelia, Mutkurov was one of the main leaders of the Bulgarian unification on 6 September 1885, the bloodless revolution that united the Principality of Bulgaria and Eastern Rumelia. Mutkurov joined the Bulgarian Secret Revolutionary Central Committee which stood behind the unification. At the time a captain, along with Dimitar Rizov he was envoyed to the Bulgarian monarch Prince Alexander of Battenberg. The two were received by the prince in Shumen, where they notified him of the forthcoming events and requested his approval. The prince did not wish to be publicly involved in an anti-Ottoman revolution, and is unclear whether he at all believed a revolution was likely to break out in Eastern Rumelia so soon. During the revolution, Mutkurov commanded some of the troops that surrounded the residence of the provincial governor Gavril Krastevich and demanded his resignation.

== Serbo–Bulgarian War and regency ==
Following the unification, from 6 to 8 September, Mutkurov was a member of the interim provincial government presided by the Commissar of South Bulgaria, Georgi Stranski. Mutkurov was one of the commanders of the Bulgarian Army in the Serbo–Bulgarian War of 1885 caused by the Kingdom of Serbia's disapproval of the Bulgarian unification. In the conflict, a Bulgarian victory that defended the revolution, Mutkurov headed the troops fighting at Tsaribrod on 13 November and was also in charge of the central and right wing forces during the Pirot Offensive on 14 and 15 November. After the war Mutkurov was appointed chief of the Plovdiv garrison and commanded the 5th Infantry Brigade.

Sava Mutkurov also played an important part in the turbulent events of 1886. In the wake of a pro-Russian coup d'état aiming to dethrone Prince Alexander, Mutkurov and Stefan Stambolov organized a counter-coup which was widely supported by the population. Mutkurov was appointed by Stambolov as the commander-in-chief of the troops loyal to Prince Alexander, and soldiers from his Plovdiv garrison were transferred to the capital Sofia to arrest or drive out the plotters. The events nevertheless led to Prince Alexander's abdication on 7 September 1886 under Russian pressure. Until the election of another Bulgarian monarch, Prince Ferdinand of Saxe–Coburg and Gotha, on 14 August 1887, Mutkurov was one of the three regents of Bulgaria, along with Stambolov and Petko Karavelov (soon replaced by Georgi Zhivkov). He was also part of the delegation that welcomed the new prince as he arrived in Svishtov to assume the throne.

== Minister of War and death ==
On 1 September 1887 that year, Mutkurov became Minister of War in Stefan Stambolov's Popular Liberal Party government. Mutkurov was a loyal friend and trusted man of the premier Stambolov, who even made him his brother-in-law. He was not, however, favoured by Prince Ferdinand. The monarch's desire was to replace him with his own confidant, Mutkurov's enemy Hristo Popov, as Minister of War. Mutkurov served in the government until 16 February 1891, when he withdrew due to deteriorating health and was promoted to Major General. He died of a heart attack on 15 March on a visit to Naples, Kingdom of Italy, and was interred at the Church of the Holy Saviour in Sofia.

Despite his active involvement in practically all major events in Bulgarian history during his lifetime, Mutkurov has been described as "very reserved and taciturn" even though he was also "honest and firm". Writer Simeon Radev regards Mutkurov as a "phlegmatic person" and his contemporary and accomplice in the unification Zahari Stoyanov would go as far as to say that "by the time Mutkurov opened his mouth, the market would close up". Together with the other two long-serving regents of 1886–1887, Stambolov and Zhivkov, Mutkurov was one of only three persons to receive the Order of Bravery 1st grade, the oldest and highest Bulgarian military decoration.

== Sources ==
- Arnold-Baker, Charles (2001). The companion to British history. Routledge. p. 200. ISBN 978-0-415-18583-7.
- Crampton, R. J. (2007). Bulgaria. Oxford University Press. p. 128. ISBN 978-0-19-820514-2.
- Miller, William (1966). The Ottoman Empire and Its Successors, 1801–1927. Routledge. p. 415. ISBN 978-0-7146-1974-3.
- Perry, Duncan M. (1993). Stefan Stambolov and the emergence of modern Bulgaria, 1870–1895. Duke University Press. p. 248. ISBN 978-0-8223-1313-7.
- Бакалов, Георги; Милен Куманов (2003). "Муткуров, Сава Атанасов (4.XII.1852–3.III.1891)". Електронно издание "История на България" (CD) (in Bulgarian). София: Труд, Сирма. ISBN 954528613X.
- Бакалов, Георги (2003). История на Българите: Военна история на българите от древността до наши дни (in Bulgarian). Труд. p. 355. ISBN 978-954-621-235-1.
- Петров, Тодор (2003). "Отличие за юнашка гръд" (in Bulgarian). Български войн. Archived from the original on March 6, 2016.
- Радев, Симеон (1990). Пантелей Зарев, Илчо Димитров (ed.). Строителите на съвременна България (in Bulgarian). Vol. 1. Царуването на кн. Александра 1879–1886. София: Български писател. p. 490. OCLC 181113625.
- Ташев, Ташо (1999). Министрите на България 1879–1999 (in Bulgarian). София: АИ „Проф. Марин Дринов“ / Изд. на МО. ISBN 978-954-430-603-8.
- Цанев, Стефан (2006). Български хроники: 1878–1943 (in Bulgarian). Vol. 3. Труд. p. 234. ISBN 978-954-528-861-6.

Political offices
| Preceded by Racho Petrov | Minister of War of Bulgaria; 1 September 1887 – 16 February 1891 | Succeeded by Mihail Savov |
