= Danail Nikolaev =

Bulgarian general

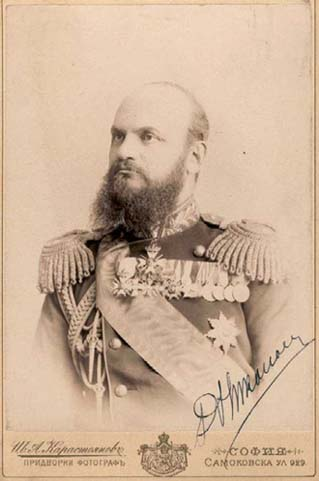
- Bulgarian Officer and Politician
- Born: 30 December 1852; Bolgrad, Russian Empire
- Died: 29 August 1942 (aged 89); Bankya, Bulgaria
- Military career
- Rank: Infantry general

Danail Tsonev Nikolaev (Bulgarian: Данаил Цонев Николаев; 30 December 1852 – 29 August 1942) was a Bulgarian officer and Minister of War on the eve of the Balkan Wars. He was the first person to attain the highest rank in the Bulgarian military, General of the infantry. He was also known as "the patriarch of the Bulgarian military".

== Biography ==
Danail Nikolaev was born in Bolgrad, Russian Empire (now Ukraine) to a Bessarabian Bulgarian family, who were refugees from Tarnovo. In 1871 he graduated from the Bolgrad Gymnasium and joined the Volunteer company of 54th Minsk regiment. On 19 September 1873 he joined the Infantry school in Odessa as a cadet, graduating in 1875. Nikolaev returned to his regiment in Chişinău as an acting cadet on 20 July. Realizing that Serbia was preparing for war with the Ottoman Empire, he requested resignation from military service to join the war on 14 June 1876. His request was reviewed by division commander General Dragomirov, who furloughed him instead. As a volunteer he took part in Serbo-Turkish War in the battles of Babina glava, Mirovitsa and Gamzi grad. He was awarded Order of Prince Danilo I and other decorations.

== Sources ==
- Samuelson, James (1888). Bulgaria: Past and Present, Historical, Political and Descriptive. London: Trübner and Co. pp. 79-80, 94 – via Internet Archive.
- Пеев, П., Генералъ отъ пехотата Данаилъ Николаевъ, София, 1942, трето издание
- Недев, С., Командването на българската войска през войните за национално обединение, София, 1993, Военноиздателски комплекс "Св. Георги Победоносец“, стр. 21–22
- Димитров, И., Съединението 1885 – енциклопедичен справочник, София, 1985, Държавно издателство "д-р Петър Берон“
- Ташев, Ташо (1999). "Министрите на България 1879–1999“. София: АИ "Проф. Марин Дринов“ / Изд. на МО. ISBN 978-954-430-603-8 / ISBN 978-954-509-191-9.

Political offices
Preceded by Olimpiy Panov	Minister of War of Bulgaria; 28 August 1886 – 10 July 1887	Succeeded by Racho Petrov
Political offices
Preceded by Mihail Savov	Minister of War of Bulgaria; 4 May 1907 – 29 March 1911	Succeeded by Nikofor Nikiforov
