= Order of Bravery =

Bulgarian War Medal

The Order of Bravery (Bulgarian: Орден „За храброст“) is a Bulgarian order which existed during the Kingdom of Bulgaria and currently exists in the Republic of Bulgaria. It was the second highest in the Kingdom of Bulgaria and is the fourth highest in the Republic of Bulgaria. It has existed since 1880 with an interruption between 1946 and 2003.

== The Royal Order ==
Royal Order of Bravery Царски Орден за храброст
- Grand Cross set of the Order

Awarded by The Tsar of the Bulgarians
- Type: Dynastic Order
- Royal house: House of Saxe-Coburg-Gotha-Koháry
- Religious affiliation: Bulgarian Orthodox
- Ribbon: Light Blue with Silver Stripes on either side.
- Eligibility: Bulgarian and Foreign Military Personnel
- Awarded for: Bravery, heroism and feats on the battlefield
- Status: Unconstituted
- Grand Master: King Simeon II
- Grades: Grand Cross; Knight I grade, 1st class Knight I grade, 2nd class Knight II grade Knight III grade, 1st class Knight III grade, 2nd class Knight IV grade, 1st class Knight IV grade, 2nd class

Precedence
- Next (higher): Royal Order of Saint Alexander
- Next (lower): Royal Order of Civil Merit; Royal Order of Military Merit
- The ribbon of the Order

The Order of Bravery was established with a decree of Knyaz Alexander Batenberg on 1 January 1880. It is the first Bulgarian order and was modeled after the Order of Military Merit of the Grand Duchy of Hesse which existed to 1866. The recipients of the order are called cavaliers. The order was one of the many violations of the Treaty of Berlin with which Bulgaria demonstrated full independence although the country was deprived of high state decorations - symbols of national independence.

The head of state and the heir to the throne were cavaliers by right to Military Order of Bravery I grade and Military Order of Bravery IV grade respectively. Due to his great respect to the order Tsar Boris III never put on the Order of Bravery I grade and the Grand cross but only the Order of Bravery III grade, 2nd class received during the First Balkan War (1912–1913); the Order of Bravery III grade, 1st class received during the First World War (1915–1918) and the Order of Bravery IV grade, 1st class which he received by right as an heir in 1894.

The order was first awarded on 17 April 1880 when 33 participants in the Russo-Turkish War (1877–1878) received the order. Several days later on 24 April (6 May NS, the Day of St George), the order was awarded for the first time to a civilian person.

Between 1937 and 1940, the sign of the Order of Bravery I grade, 1st class was used as a symbol of the Bulgarian Air Force in analogue with the Iron Cross which was the traditional symbol of the Luftwaffe. Several German officers received this award during World War II.

After the end of the monarchy the orders and the medals of the Kingdom of Bulgaria were fully substituted with other ones. On 15 September the Order of Bravery ceased to exist.

=== Description ===
==== Order of Bravery ====
- Grand Cross of the Order of Bravery

The Grand Cross was awarded only to the ruler who was a Grand Master of the order. It consisted of a necklace, a star and a mantle. There are five emissions.

- Order of Bravery I grade, 1st class (until 1886 it was called Order of Bravery I grade)

There are four emissions.

- Order of Bravery I grade, 2nd class (since 1886)

That order was awarded to Bulgarian and foreign generals and foreign rulers. Second, third and fourth grade were given to generals and officers according to their rank.

- Order of Bravery II grade

There are two emissions.

- Order of Bravery III grade, 1st class (until 1915 it was called Order of Bravery III grade)

There are three emissions.

- Order of Bravery III grade, 2nd class (since 1915)

There are five emissions.

- Order of Bravery IV grade, 1st class (until 1915 it was called Order of Bravery IV grade)

There are seven emissions.

- Order of Bravery IV grade, 2nd class (since 1915)

There are ten emissions.

==== Soldier Cross of Bravery ====
The Soldier Cross of Bravery was a medal enlisted to the Order of Bravery.

- Soldier Cross of Bravery I grade

Gold-plated, with crossed ribbons

- Soldier Cross of Bravery II grade

Gold-plated, without crossed ribbons

- Soldier Cross of Bravery III grade

Silver-plated, with crossed ribbons

- Soldier Cross of Bravery IV grade

Silver-plated, without crossed ribbons

=== Knights of the Order of Bravery I grade ===
In the Bulgarians history there are only three persons awarded with the Order of Bravery I grade:

- Stefan Stambolov - Bulgarian statesman, revolutionary, politician, poet and journalist.
- Georgi Zhivkov - Bulgarian revolutionary and politician of the People's Liberal Party, three times chairman of the National Assembly, regent of Bulgaria after the abdication of Alexander I (1886–1887) and minister of enlightenment (1886, 1887–1893).
- Major General Sava Mutkurov - regent of Bulgaria (1886–1887) and minister of defense in the government of Stefan Stambolov (1887–1893).

Monarchs:

- Knyaz Alexander Batenberg
- Tsar Ferdinand
- Tsar Boris III
- Emperor Alexander III of Russia
- King Milan I of Serbia
- King Carol I of Romania

The order was also awarded to:

- The Samara flag
- 3rd Opalchenska company

== The Republic Order ==
Order of Bravery Орден „За храброст“
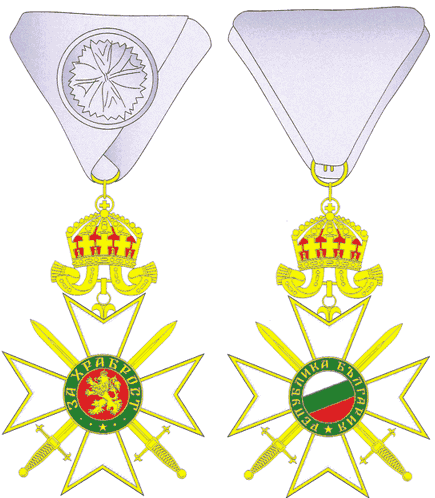
- The Grand Officer's Medal of the Order

Awarded by The President of Bulgaria
- Type: State Order
- Religious affiliation: Bulgarian Orthodox
- Ribbon: Blue
- Eligibility: Civil, Military
- Awarded for: Awarded for Bravery and heroism for the Bulgarian state and society
- Status: Currently awarded
- Grand Master: President Rosen Plevneliev
- Grades: Grand Officer; Commander; Officer

Precedence
- Next (higher): Order of the Madara Horseman
- Next (lower): Merit Medal
- The ribbon of the Order

The order was reestablished after interruption of 57 years with a law by the 39th National Assembly of 29 May 2003 and published in State Gazette on 21 May 2004. In its contemporary form it has three grades without classes and is again with swords for military personnel and without swords for civilians.

== See also ==
- Orders, decorations, and medals of Bulgaria
