= My Ghost Story =

- Also known as: My Ghost Story: Hauntings Revealed, My Ghost Story: Caught on Camera
- Genre: Paranormal
- Composers: Lawrence H. Brown; Charles Barth
- Country of origin: United States
- Original language: English
- No. of seasons: 6
- No. of episodes: 75

Production
- Executive producers: Mark Phillips; Hudie Ayalon
- Producers: Eric Anderson, Jason Bourgault, Adam Bain, Gary Basmajian, Barry Conrad, Ken Davis, Rick Davis, Mark Greczemiel, Nathan Nowak, Brian Phenix, Camille Strayhorn, Renee Tod, Cynthia Calderon Toscano
- Editors: Jon Budd, Lila Cornia, Mike Gallagher, David Harris, Mark Leija, David Milhous, Sef Morris, Juliette Olivarria
- Camera setup: Single-camera
- Running time: 45 minutes
- Production companies: Mark Phillips Philms & Telephision

Original release
- Network: Biography Channel; Lifetime Movie Network; FYI; Travel Channel
- Release: July 17, 2010 – September 28, 2013

Related
- Celebrity Ghost Stories

My Ghost Story is an American television series on the paranormal, which premiered on July 17, 2010, on the Biography Channel. The series features ghost stories told from a person's own supposed experience with the supernatural. Each episode features claims of encounters at reportedly haunted locations all over the United States, as well as a few locations in other countries. A spin-off series My Ghost Story Asia premiered on the Biography Channel (Asia) on 16 August 2012 featuring stories from Singapore and Malaysia. The fifth season started on October 5, 2012, on Fridays at 9/8 Central. The sixth season which began on August 12, 2013, aired on the Biography Channel, the original broadcast channel, but halfway through the season the broadcast channel was changed to the Lifetime Movie Network (LMN).

== Synopsis ==
Each episode is narrated by people who tell their own unique ghost stories and personal experiences of alleged paranormal activity and supposed encounters with the unexplained in a particular location. These individuals usually start off the show by saying "My ghost story began when..." They also show the viewers' visual evidence they claim to have captured on their homemade videos.

Each episode features reenactments, video clips, and interviews of people who claim to have experienced encounters with the supernatural. These stories also include some historical facts of the reportedly haunted locations.

== Syndication ==
Note: The My Ghost Story series is based on the 2008 and 2009 specials My Ghost Story: Hauntings Revealed. New episodes formerly aired on the Biography Channel Saturday nights at 10pm EST. Season two premiered on April 9, 2011. Season three premiered on October 15, 2011. Season four premiered on April 21, 2012. My Ghost Story formerly aired on Lifetime/Lifetime Movie Network. As of 2019, My Ghost Story is currently airing rewreruns on FYI and on Travel Channel.

Warning: At the beginning of each episode a parental advisory warning is shown: "What you are about to see are haunted events encountered by real people. Some may find it disturbing."

== Series overview ==
Season	Episodes	Season premiere	Season finale
1	8	July 17, 2010	October 29, 2010
2	10	April 9, 2011	June 11, 2011
3	10	October 15, 2011	December 17, 2011
4	14	April 21, 2012	July 14, 2012
5	26	October 5, 2012	May 18, 2013
6	8	August 12, 2013	September 28, 2013

== Specials ==
Sp. #	Special Title	Original Airdate
1	My Ghost Story: Hauntings Revealed	October 30, 2008
Locations	"The Impound Ghost" - Puckett's Body Shop & Wrecker Service, Oklahoma City, Oklahoma; "The Ghost Child" - Waverly Hills Sanitorium, Louisville, Kentucky; "The Haunted Seaport House" - (private residence), San Pedro, California; "A Mist With A Mind Of Its Own" - McPike Mansion, Alton, Illinois; "The Graveyard Ghost" - (private residence), Bardstown, Kentucky; "The Hospice Closet Ghost" - Granada Hills Community Hospital, Los Angeles, California; "The Ghostwriter" - (private residence), Los Angeles, California	
Overview	This is the special that started the My Ghost Story series: "People share videos they captured of their paranormal experiences."	
2	My Ghost Story: Hauntings Revealed 2	July 4, 2009
Locations	"The Ghost Town Reaper" - Cerro Gordo, Central California; "Possession In The Heartland" - (private residence), Atchison, Kansas; "Attack Of The Phantom" - The Stanley Hotel, Estes Park, Colorado; "Haunted Plantation" - The Myrtles Plantation, St. Francisville, Louisiana; "Tabitha's Ghost" - (private residence), San Diego, California; "Civil War Ghosts" - Gettysburg Battlefield, Gettysburg, Pennsylvania	
Overview	This is the second special that aired right before the My Ghost Story series started: "People share videos they captured of their paranormal experiences."	

== Episodes ==
=== Season 1 (2010) ===
Ep. #	Episode Title	Original Airdate
1.1	The Evil Down Below	July 17, 2010
Locations	"Bewarehouse" - EMF Engineering Building, Carson, California; "Haunted on the High Seas" - Star of India, San Diego, California; "Ghost of the Underground Railroad" - (old farmhouse), Eaton, Ohio; "Bride Lost in Time" - Fairmont Algonquin Hotel, St. Andrews, New Brunswick, Canada; "The Ghost is Clear" - Driskill Hotel, Austin, Texas; "The Claw Haunting" - Kashmir Silk Boutique, Virginia City, Nevada	
Overview		
1.2	The Incubus	July 24, 2010
Locations	"Freaky Farmhouse" - The Pig Farm (slaughterhouse), Bayview, Wisconsin; "The Ghost of Green Castle" - (private residence), Greencastle, Indiana; "Work-Out Ghost" - Anytime Fitness, Overland Park, Kansas; "Ghosts Run in the Family" - Horton Farm and Cemetery, Bridgton, Maine; "Attack of the Incubus" - (private residence), Fairfield, Ohio; "Haunting in the Woods" - (private sporting camp & lodge), Backwoods, Maine	
Overview		
1.3	I Died In This House	July 31, 2010
Locations	"Spirits of Slaughter" - New Mexico State Penitentiary, Santa Fe, New Mexico; "Haunted Bunker" - (Saddam Hussein's Iraqi Army 1980s bunker near a U.S. Army base), Wasit Provence, Iraq; "Shower Spa Ghost" - Majestic Hotel Bathouse & Spa, Hot Springs, Arkansas; "Mad Madam In The Mansion" - Olivier House Hotel, New Orleans, Louisiana; "Angel Mom" - Florin Fauna (flower boutique), Austin, Texas	
Overview		
1.4	The Boy In The Closet	August 7, 2010
Locations	"Spirit Boy of Monterey" - (private residence), Monterey, California; "Baffling Blue Mist" - (Gas station), Parma, Ohio; "From Silver City To Ghost Town" - Silver City Ghost Town, Bodfish, California; "Dog's Best Friend" - (private residence), Oak Park, California; "Suicide Gambler" - Holbrooke Hotel, Grass Valley, California; "Tortured Souls In The Hollywood Hills" - (private residence near the Sharon Tate murders area), Los Angeles, California	
Overview		
1.5	Screams In The Dark	August 14, 2010
Locations	"Above The Mass Grave" - (private residence), Milton, Florida; "The Most Haunted Town In Texas" - Pride House Pub, Jefferson, Texas; "Spirits of a Stage Coach Stop" - Paci's Lounge, Brownsville, Pennsylvania; "Presidential Apparition" - President Polk's Tomb, Nashville, Tennessee; "The Grey Ghost" - RMS Queen Mary, Long Beach, California; "Phantoms From The Morgue" - Crescent Hotel & Spa, Eureka Springs, Arkansas	
Overview		
1.6	The Face In The Window	August 21, 2010
Locations	"Evil Entity Intervention" - Civil War Museum at the Exchange Hotel, Gordonsville, Virginia; "Mirage at the Menger" - Menger Hotel, San Antonio, Texas; "Demonic Engagement" - (private residence), Buffalo, New York; "Silent Film Freakout" - Return to Babylon (silent film), Los Angeles, California; "Whaley House" - Whaley House, San Diego, California; "Entity Cafe" - Coral Cafe (family restaurant), Burbank, California	
Overview		
1.7	It Watches Me While I Sleep	August 28, 2010
Locations	"Mysteriously Moving Giraffe" - (private residence), San Gabriel, California; "Demonic Voice" - This Is the Place Heritage Park, Salt Lake City, Utah; "The Gangster Ghost Bar" - Liquid Assets Gentlemen's Club, South Plainfield, New Jersey; "Ghostly Intruder" - Mill Agent's House, North Vassalboro, Maine; "A Brutal Murder Revealed" - Kenniston Hill Inn, Boothbay, Maine; "Spirits in the Basement" - (private residence), California, Pennsylvania	
Overview		
1.8	The Axe Murderer	October 29, 2010
Locations	"Villisca House Axe Murders" - Villisca Axe Murder House, Villisca, Iowa; "Sleeping Scared" - (private residence), Villisca, Iowa; "Finley's Phantom Bar" - Finley's Bar & Grill, Manteca, California; "Spirits In The Tunnel" - Moonville Rail-Trail, Appalachian Mountains, Zaleski State Forest, Moonville, Ohio, Vinton County, Ohio; "Grandmother's Visit" - (private residence), Thousand Oaks, California; "Gateway To Gettysburg" - Sachs Covered Bridge, Gettysburg, Pennsylvania	
Overview		

=== Season 2 (2011) ===
Ep. #	Episode Title	Original Airdate
2.1	An Entity In Bed	April 2, 2011
Locations	"Creepy Sleep" - (private residence), Pasadena, Maryland; "A Piercing Experience" - Tillie Pierce House Inn, Gettysburg, Pennsylvania; "The Phantasmagorical Castle" - Nemacolin Castle, Brownsville, Pennsylvania; "Eternal Love Affair" - Myrtles Plantation, St. Francisville, Louisiana; "Hair-Raising Hospital of Horror" - Linda Vista Community Hospital, Los Angeles, California; "A Ghostly House Guest" - (private residence), Hattiesburg, Mississippi	
Overview		
2.2	A Haunted House	April 9, 2011
Locations	"Haunted Attraction" - Black Moon Manor, Greenfield, Indiana; "Destination Eternity" - Allegheny Airlines Flight 853 (crash site), Fairland, Indiana; "Anger At Iron Island" - Iron Island Museum, Buffalo, New York; "Spooky Speakeasy" - Gas Light Inn, Indianapolis, Indiana; "Secretary Scare" - Victorian house (real estate offices) (former funeral home), New Lenox, Illinois; "Ghost Boy and His Dog" - Andrew Woods House, Gettysburg, Pennsylvania	
Overview		
2.3	The Demon In The Mist	April 16, 2011
Locations	"The Smoking Ghost" - St. Augustine Lighthouse, Saint Augustine, Florida; "Phantom Security Breach" - Anderson Municipal Business Center, Anderson, South Carolina; "Ghost in the Water" - (private residence), Irvine, California; "Bad Manored Demon" - (private residence), Manor, Texas; "Restless Restroom" - Hurricane Patty's Restaurant & Bar at Oyster Creek Marina, Saint Augustine, Florida; "House of 1,000 Spirits" - Victorian house (private residence), Hastings, Minnesota	
Overview		
2.4	The Hand of Death	April 23, 2011
Locations	"Tale of a Crypt" - Evergreen Cemetery, Colorado Springs, Colorado; "Slaughter in the Basement" - Haunted Farmhouse (private residence), Fort Scott, Kansas; "Haunted Horse Farm" - Horse Farm (private residence), Salvisa, Kentucky; "Prosperous Spirits" - Prosperity School Bed & Breakfast, Joplin, Missouri; "Light Fright" - (private residence), Ocala, Florida; "Christmas Light Anomaly" - Early 19th-century house (private residence), St. Clairsville, Pennsylvania	
Overview		
2.5	The Dark Spirit	April 30, 2011
Locations	"A Family's Inferno" - Palmyra Historical Museum, Palmyra, New York; "Beware of Wolfe Manor" - Wolfe Manor, Clovis, California; "The Mist Train" - Short Line Railroad Enginehouse, Gettysburg, Pennsylvania; "Phantom of the Opera House" - Rohs Opera House, Cynthiana, Kentucky; "A Housewarming Surprise" - (private residence), Surprise, Arizona; "Hangman Haunting" - Jean Bonnet Tavern, Bedford, Pennsylvania	
Overview		
2.6	Life After Death	May 7, 2011
Locations	"'Til Death Do Us Part" - (private residence), Boynton Beach, Florida; "A Family Drawn Together" - (private residence), Reno, Nevada; "Bloodcurdling Birdcage" - Bird Cage Theatre, Tombstone, Arizona; "Smiling Ghost" - Huguenot Cemetery, St. Augustine, Florida; "The Hauntings of Buggs Temple" - Creation Cafe and Euphoria Restaurant at Buggs Temple, Indianapolis, Indiana; "Spirited Bar Brawl" - Katie's Bar, Long Island, Smithtown, New York	
Overview		
2.7	I Am Full of Madness	May 14, 2011
Locations	"Mirror, Mirror on the Chifferobe" - (private residence), Martinsville, Indiana; "Suicide Mansion" - Lemp Mansion, St. Louis, Missouri; "No Demons Allowed" - Snow Hill Country Club, New Vienna, Ohio; "The Grim Rapper" - (private residence), Norwich, Connecticut; "Supernatural Settlement" - Oregon Country Settlement, Rhododendron, Oregon; "Active Octagon" - Civil War Museum at Octagon Hall, Franklin, Kentucky	
Overview		
2.8	The Presence	May 21, 2011
Locations	"Attack of the Bomb Factory" - Gulf Ordnance Factory, Prairie, Mississippi; "Mid Evil Castle" - Preston Castle, Ione, California; "Screams From The Cellar" - The Cellar Restaurant at Villa del Sol (former The Hotel California), Fullerton, California; "Kodi The Friendly Ghost" - Mount Calvary Cemetery, Mosquero, New Mexico; "Hexed From Beyond" - Tilley Bend Cemetery, Blue Ridge, Georgia; "School's Out Forever" - Farrar Schoolhouse, Farrar, Iowa	
Overview		
2.9	Simon Says Die	June 4, 2011
Locations	"Possession at the Palmer" - Palmer House Hotel, Sauk Centre, Minnesota; "I.C.U. Ghosts" - Old South Pittsburg Hospital, South Pittsburg, Tennessee; "Simon Says Die" - The Bissman Building, Mansfield, Ohio; "Unluck of the Irish" - Kells Irish Pub (aka the Butterworth Building), Seattle, Washington; "Uneasy Underground" - Shanghai Tunnels, Portland, Oregon; "Phantom Farewell" - (private residence), Laguna Niguel, California	
Overview		
2.10	Things That Go Bump In The Night	June 11, 2011
Locations	"Black Mass" - Trichome Health Consultanta (wellness-center office), Colorado Springs, Colorado; "Bishop of Brownella" - Brownella Cottage, Galion, Ohio; "Disturbance in the Jailhouse" - Freestone County Museum/Barbara & H. Neil Bass Wing (19th century jail), Fairfield, Texas; "Bedlam in Bellville" - (private residence), Bellville, Ohio; "Bumps in the Night" - Crescent Hotel, Eureka Springs, Arkansas; "Scratches in the Night" - 17 Hundred 90 Inn & Restaurant, Savannah, Georgia	
Overview		

=== Season 3 (2011) ===
Ep. #	Episode Title	Original Airdate
3.1	The Demon Shadow	October 15, 2011
Locations	"The Demon Shadow" - (private residence), Cumberland, Rhode Island; "The Curse of the Colonel" - The Eldridge Hotel, Lawrence, Kansas; "Spirit Seekers" - abandoned Confederate cemetery, Jefferson National Forest, New Castle, Virginia; "Howl at the Moon" - Clippety-Do-Dawg Pet Grooming Shop, Cumberland, Indiana; "Spirit of Sarah" - Ohio Cottage (aka Madison Seminary), Madison, Ohio; "Cold and Creepy Condo" - (private residence), Los Angeles, California	
Overview		
3.2	Lessons From Beyond	October 22, 2011
Locations	"Lessons From Beyond" - Broughton School, Finleyville, Pennsylvania; "Watch Your Baxter Morgue" - Baxter Avenue Morgue (haunted attraction), Louisville, Kentucky; "Dearly Departed" - (private residence), Olathe, Kansas; "Ghostly Gun Shots" - East Cemetery Hill, Gettysburg National Military Park, Gettysburg, Pennsylvania; "The Hill House Has Eyes" - (private residence), Gainesville, Texas; "The Dark Lighthouse" - Fairport Harbor Lighthouse, Fairport Harbor, Ohio	
Overview		
3.3	Scary Mary	October 29, 2011
Locations	"Honkey Tonk Horror" - Bobby Mackey's Music World, Wilder, Kentucky; "Articulate Apparition" - Brentwood Restaurant and Wine Bistro, Little River, South Carolina; "9/11 Ghosts" - Fresh Kills Landfill and (private residence), Staten Island, New York; "No Knocking in the Library" - Tallassee Community Library, Tallassee, Alabama; "Menacing Mobster" - Casa Madrid, Melrose Park, Illinois; "Scary Mary" - Rockwood Museum and Park, Wilmington, Delaware	
Overview		
3.4	Devil in the Blue Dress	November 5, 2011
Locations	"All Hand on Deck" - USS North Carolina, Wilmington, North Carolina; "Mayhem at the Mansfield" - Mansfield Building (aka Bissman Building), Mansfield, Ohio; "The Stalking Shadow" - (private residence), Gerber, California; "Devil in the Blue Dress" - (private residence), Johnson Creek, Wisconsin; "Croaking Canines" - Croke-Patterson-Campbell Mansion, Denver, Colorado; "Eternal Abyss" - Dollinger Family Farm (The Abyss Haunted House) (haunted attraction), Channahon, Illinois	
Overview		
3.5	Hotel Hell	November 12, 2011
Locations	"Stemie's Unsolved Mysteries" - Stemie's Place Family Restaurant, Easton, Pennsylvania; "Mt. Misery Loves Company" - Mount Misery Road, Huntington, Long Island, New York; "There's Something About St. Mary's" - St. Mary's Art Center, Virginia City, Nevada; "Good Golly Miss Molly Tynes" - Molly Tynes Farm, Tazewell, Virginia; "Hotel Hell" - Georgetown Hotel, Georgetown, California; "The Rotten Rotting Judge" - (private residence), Sacramento, California	
Overview		
3.6	Lizzie Borden Took An Axe	November 19, 2011
Locations	"Fireplace Phantoms" - (private residence), Rough and Ready, California; "41 Whacks and He's Back" - Lizzie Borden House, Fall River, Massachusetts; "The Fountain of Death" - The Melting Pot: A Fondue Restaurant (former Old Littleton Public Library), Littleton, Colorado; "Burning Bed and Breakfast" - Old Hollis Inn, Marengo, Iowa; "The Roaming Spirits of the Ren" - Renaissance Theatre, Mansfield, Ohio; "The Demonic Monk" - Manresa Castle, Port Townsend, Washington	
Overview		
3.7	Reflections from the Other Side	November 26, 2011
Locations	"The Serpent's Mansion" - Lumber Baron Inn, Denver, Colorado; "The Cyanide Sister" - Allen House, Monticello, Arkansas; "Reflections From The Other Side" - Ponderosa House, Gulfport, Mississippi; "Mystifying Mystery Ship" - USS Salem, Quincy, Massachusetts; "Agora Phobia" - Agora Theatre, Cleveland, Ohio; "My Family's Haunted House" - (private residence), Bellbrook, Ohio	
Overview		
3.8	Screamville	December 3, 2011
Locations	"Here's Looking At You, Kid" - (private residence), Riverside, California; "Oscar The Grouch" - Oscar Swan Country Inn, Geneva, Illinois; "Petrifying Phantasy" - Phantasy Theater, Lakewood, Ohio; "Oh My God, It's A Ghost" - (private residence), Hinesville, Georgia; "The Pioneering Spirits" - Lewis County Museum, Chehalis, Washington; "Screamville" - Screamville Haunted House, Forest City, Illinois	
Overview	A man is haunted by the ghost of his late father; a spirit named "Oscar" haunts an Illinois bed and breakfast; owners believe they're not the only ones residing in their Georgia home; a haunted haunted attraction; and an Iraq War veteran hears whispers in his ear while in bed at night.	
3.9	There is Something Evil in this House	December 10, 2011
Locations	"Scary Mary" - The Rising Sun Inn, Franconia, Pennsylvania; "Beelzebub's Burial Ground" - The Point Cemetery, Logtown, Mississippi (Also appeared on Fact or Faked "Graveyard Lightning/Truck Stop Terror); "Jarring Jordan Springs" - Historic Jordan Springs, Jordan Springs, Virginia; "The Coal Miner's Cemetery" - The Historical Pocahontas Cemetery, Pocahontas, Virginia; "Southern Fried Spirits" - Catfish Plantation Restaurant, Waxahachie, Texas; "Shadows In My House" - (private residence), Ashland, Virginia	
Overview		
3.10	Holiday Hauntings	December 17, 2011
Locations	"Spooky Surveillance Camera" - The Farside Lounge, Colorado Springs, Colorado; "A Family's Inferno" - Palmyra Historical Museum, Palmyra, New York (from Season 2, episode 5); "Dog's Best Friend" - (private residence), Oak Park, California (from Season 1, episode 4); "Christmas Light Anomaly" - (private residence), St. Clairsville, Pennsylvania (from Season 2, episode 4); "The Ghost Is Clear" - Driskill Hotel, Austin, Texas (from Season 1, episode 1); "Tabitha's Ghost" - (private residence), San Diego, California (from My Ghost Story: Hauntings Revealed 2)	
Overview	This special episode features holiday-themed hauntings from previous seasons.	

=== Season 4 (2012) ===
Note: This season is subtitled My Ghost Story: Caught on Camera.

Ep. #	Episode Title	Original Airdate
4.1	The Uninvited	April 21, 2012
Locations	"The Spirited Stripper" - Times Square Comedy Club, New York City, New York; "The Barber From Beyond" - The Grove, Jefferson, Texas; "Children of the Mill" - Baron Woolen Mill, Brigham City, Utah; "The Uninvited" - (private residence), Reedsville, Ohio; "Bones in the Basement" - S. K. Pierce Mansion, Gardner, Massachusetts; "Back Scratch Fever" - (private residence), Washington Courthouse, Ohio	
Overview	A New York City club manager feels the presence of stripper who was murdered there many years ago; a dead barber gives massages from beyond the grave; a family sees the ghost of an American Indian in front of their fireplace; a man and his fiancée begin to believe in ghosts when they move into a mysterious Victorian mansion; and a woman lying in bed feels cold claws pawing at her face.	
4.2	Bones in The Basement	April 21, 2012
Locations	"Spirits on Tap" - Si Greene's Pub, Indianapolis, Indiana; "The Road to Apparition" - Scottdale Road (Shrigley Park), Lansdowne, Pennsylvania; "House of Paine" - Paine House Museum, Coventry, Rhode Island; "Satan's Wall" - Haunted House Hideaway (haunted attraction), Georgetown, Illinois; "One Starry Nightmare" - (haunted cemetery), Edgerly, Louisiana; "Paging Doctor Death" - Columbia Manor Haunted House (haunted attraction), Columbia, Alabama	
Overview	A paranormal group captures an EVP of a former customer, Leo and mist by the pool table; Two brothers investigate an accident site and believed they captured apparitions of the 3 youths who were killed there; A man tries to help a girl's spirit reunite with her family; Paranormal investigators captured an apparition in a haunted house attraction; A paranormal investigator was attacked in a cemetery; and a chandelier that was used for a suicide now swings by itself.	
4.3	Paranormal Studies 101	April 28, 2012
Locations	"Incorporeal Punishment" - Farrar Elementary School, Farrar, Iowa; "Ashes to Orbs" - Folsom Spirits Ghost Tours (private property), Folsom, Louisiana; "Paranormal Studies 101" - Sierra Sky Ranch, Fresno, California; "Linda's Lights" - Last Dollar Inn Bed & Breakfast, Cripple Creek, Colorado; "Whispering Walls" - Cave of the Winds Discovery Tour, Manitou Springs, Colorado	
Overview	An investigator gets attacked at an abandoned school; A Louisiana property is a portal between this world and the spirit realm; A paranormal training class visits an old ranch that was once a hospital for patients with tuberculosis; The home belonging to a former astrologer is now a hotspot for ghostly energy; and shadows and misty apparitions are photographed in a cave in Colorado.	
4.4	Fear The Creeper	April 28, 2012
Locations	"The Axe Man Cometh" - Villisca Axe Murder House, Villisca, Iowa; "Take a Picture, It'll Slash Longer" - (private residence), Lisbon Falls, Maine; "Fear the Creeper" - Graber Olive House, Ontario, California; "Leave it to Cleaver" - (private residence), Shakopee, Minnesota; "Where the Spirits Roam" - Miss Molly's Hotel Bed and Breakfast, Fort Worth, Texas	
Overview	Ghosts of an unsolved murder continue to haunt the home which was the site of the grisly crime; Photographic anomalies begin to appear over a woman's neck in order to intimidate her; Investigators photograph a shadow known as 'the Creeper'; A negative energy takes its emotional toll on the family; and a former Texas bordello is haunted by a cowboy named Jake and other phantom figures.	
4.5	Anchored Spirits	May 5, 2012
Locations	"To Hell's Hole and Back" - Pierce Cemetery, Lafayette, Indiana; "Ghost Scratch Fever" - Poasttown Elementary School, Middletown, Ohio; "Rising Sun, Falling Spirit" - Rising Sun Hotel, Columbia, Pennsylvania; "From Cave To Grave" - (privately owned cave), Somerset, Kentucky; "Anchored Spirits" - USS North Carolina, Wilmington, North Carolina; "Gas Lamp Ghost" - The William Heath Davis House, San Diego, California	
Overview	An entity from a graveyard follows a paranormal investigator back to his home; Two ghost hunters are terrorized while investigating a school; A couple purchases a hotel dating back to the 1850s only to discover that it is haunted by the original owner and several other spirits; A cave is haunted by an aggressive ghost; A historic military ship is a paranormal hotspot for apparitions and shadows; and an old San Diego museum has voices from the past.	
4.6	End of The Line	May 5, 2012
Locations	"Lizzie's Legacy" - Lizzie Borden House, Fall River, Massachusetts; "End of the Line" - Bristol Train Station, Bristol, Virginia; "Southern Discomfort" - Rocky Point Manor, Harrodsburg, Kentucky; "Burning Down the Haunted House" - Hannah House, Indianapolis, Indiana; "Spirits in the Stacks" - Browse Awhile Books (private business), Tipp City, Ohio	
Overview	The site of an infamous double-homicide continues to thrive with paranormal activity; A tall apparition is caught on a camera in a train station; A former Civil War hospital gives two investigators an experience they won't forget; a house used for the Underground Railroad is said to have a tragic history; and a former employee is photographed at a book store.	
4.7	Sweet Caroline's Ghost	May 12, 2012
Locations	"Spirited Phone Call" - Alexander Majors House Museum, Kansas City, Missouri; "Working Ghouls" - Gypsy Rose Dancing (historic building), Quincy, Massachusetts; "Hide and Go Haunt" - McNutt House, Vicksburg, Mississippi; "Sweet Caroline's Ghost" - Miss Caroline's Bed & Breakfast, St. Augustine, Florida; "Portal to Hell" - (private residence), Bellaire, Ohio	
Overview	A remote viewer joins a paranormal investigation at a historic Kansas City home; A pole-dancing studio is the site of odd light anomalies; A Civil War lieutenant and a little girl haunt a 19th century house; A bed and breakfast that was once a tuberculosis hospital is haunted by a playful five year-old girl; and a woman is terrorized by an evil energy.	
4.8	Ship of Lost Souls	June 2, 2012
Locations	"Respect Your Eldreds" - James J. Eldred House, Eldred, Illinois; "Sweet Child Divine" - (private residence), Ramona, California; "Ship of Lost Souls" - USS Hornet, Alameda, California; "Best Little Haunt Town in Texas" - Jefferson Hotel, Jefferson, Texas; "Spirit Searcher" - (haunted bookstore) (former bordello), Fort Worth, Texas	
Overview	Several apparitions are seen at a historic Illinois home; Grieving parents are visited by the ghost of their daughter; Ghostly sailors continue to haunt a naval ship; Multiple buildings in Jefferson, Texas show proof of paranormal during a ghost tour; and a bookstore provides more than just reading material.	
4.9	Nightmare on 6th Street	June 9, 2012
Locations	"Final Curtain Call" - Twin City Opera House, McConnelsville, Ohio; "Nightmare on 6th Street" 6th Street Massacre Haunted House (haunted attraction), Amarillo, Texas; "See You at the Knick" - Knickerbocker Hotel, Linesville, Pennsylvania; "Calvin and Haunts" - Calvin Center (youth center), Youngstown, Ohio; "Playtime in Hell House" - The Exchange Hotel, Gordonsville, Virginia	
Overview	An opera house is the site of many ghostly anomalies; A Texas Halloween attraction has evidence to prove it may be scarier than originally intended; A shadow figure haunts a hotel built in the 19th century; Investigators in an old schoolhouse get more than they bargained for after one of the members gets scratched on the neck; and Civil War ghosts continue to haunt a Virginia hotel.	
4.10	Unholy Hounds	June 16, 2012
Locations	"Hair-Raising Spirits" - Quequechan Club Mansion, Fall River, Massachusetts; "Vox in the Box" - (private residence), Lynchburg, Virginia; "You Can Check Inn, But You Can Never Leave" - Stone Lion Inn, Guthrie, Oklahoma; "Unholy Hounds" - Sedamsville Rectory, Cincinnati, Ohio; "Cedar House Ghouls" - (private residence), Cedar Falls, Iowa	
Overview		
4.11	Let's Scare Them	June 23, 2012
Locations	"Dead Horse Walking" - Walking Horse Hotel, Wartrace, Tennessee; "Decapitation Station" - Cohoke Crossing ("Cohoke Ghost Lights"), West Point, Virginia; "Attack Attic" - (private residence), Norwood, Ohio; "Alice in Spookyland" - Virgil Hickox House, Springfield, Illinois; "Whispering Willow" - Willow Creek Farm, Cherry Grove Township, Illinois	
Overview		
4.12	The Bride Wore Black	June 30, 2012
Locations	"Shadow of a Doubt" - (private residence), Gatesville, Texas; "The Refrigerator Has Eyes" - Hall Apple Farm, Lockport, New York; "The Bride Wore Black" - Little Rock Visitor Center at Curran Hall, Little Rock, Arkansas; "Pysch Ward" - Glore Psychiatric Museum at St. Joseph Museum, St. Joseph, Missouri; "My Big Fat Ghostly Wedding" - Pride House, Jefferson, Texas	
Overview		
4.13	Attracting Spirits	July 7, 2012
Locations	"Ghost Puppy" - (private residence), Joplin, Missouri; "Ghosts in the Time of Cholera" - Rose Island Lighthouse, Newport, Rhode Island; "Echoes from Drowning Creek" - (private residence), Arlington, Washington; "Attracting Spirits" - (private residence), Rocklin, California; "Ghost Central Station" - Central House, Napoleon, Indiana	
Overview		
4.14	The Dead Can Dance	July 14, 2012
Locations	"Salem Witch Dungeon" - Ten Federal Building and Gallows Hill Park, Salem, Massachusetts; "Dance Terror" - Windsor Dance Academy, Sonoma, California; "The Dead Can Dance" - Allegan Elks Lodge, Allegan, Michigan; "Daddy Deadcare" - (private residence), Corona, California; "Fannytasm" - "Miss Fanny's" (private residence), Wappingers Falls, New York	
Overview		

=== Season 5 (2012-2013) ===
Note: This season is also subtitled My Ghost Story: Caught on Camera.

Ep. #	Episode Title	Original Airdate
5.1	Documenting Death	October 5, 2012
Locations	"No More Last Calls" - Colburn's Bar and Nightclub, Humble, Texas; "Documenting Death" - Congress Theater, Chicago, Illinois; "Spooky in Spokane" - (private residence), Spokane, Washington; "Cemetery Secrets" - Oswego Cemetery, Oswego, Illinois; "Tim's Spooky Treasures" - Tim's Secret Tresures (antique store), Charleroi, Pennsylvania	
Overview		
5.2	Rocco's Revenge	October 5, 2012
Locations	"Commotion at the Ocean" - Ocean House Dining & Entertainment, Carlsbad, California; "Hell-O Dolly" - Shadow Canyon, Arcadia, California; "Bedford's Beastly Bug" - Bedford Tavern (hotel and restaurant), Bedford, Pennsylvania; "Rocco's Revenge" - Casa Madrid, Melrose Park, Illinois (This location was featured on the season 3 episode "Scary Mary" entitled "Menacing Mobster"); "The Good, the Dead, and the Ugly" - The Express St. James Hotel, Cimarron, New Mexico	
Overview		
5.3	Ghosts on the Grange	October 12, 2012
Locations	"To Haunt and Protect" - Junction City Police Department (town municipal building), Junction City, Ohio; "Specter from the Past" - "Garrs Lane Project" (private residence), Louisville, Kentucky; "Sister Pact" - Storyville at Coplay Square Hotel, Boston, Massachusetts; "Ghosts at the Grange" - "The Grange" (South Bristol Historical Society building), South Bristol, New York; "Churning Souls" – St. Mary's Church (Russian church and hilltop cemetery), Centralia, Pennsylvania	
Overview		
5.4	Church of Darkness	October 19, 2012
Locations	"Ghosts of Conviction" - Ohio State Reformatory (Mansfield Reformatory), Mansfield, Ohio; "How the Bell Tolls" - (private residence), Fort Collins, Colorado; "Spirits of the Departed" - Confederate Women's Home, Austin, Texas; "Playtime Possession" - (1800s house/former hospital), Elk Grove, California; "Church of Darkness" - Blackbear Church, Bristow, Oklahoma	
Overview		
5.5	Damnation Plantation	October 26, 2012
Locations	"He Who Must Not Be Named" - (private residence), Salt Lake City, Utah; "Leave Those Kids Alone" - Antiques & Uniques Collectables, St. Augustine, Florida; "Middle Burning Town Hall" - Middleborough Town Hall, Middleborough, Massachusetts; "Patton Was a Fake" - (private residence), Gettysburg, Pennsylvania; "Damnation Plantation" - (1910 plantation house), Lineville, Alabama	
Overview		
5.6	Phantoms of the Opera House	November 2, 2012
Locations	"Gruesome Twosome" - The Antlers Restaurant & Bar, Sault Sainte Marie, Michigan; "Dedman vs. Dead Man" - The Harrodsburg Herald Building (former Benjamin Passmore House), Harrodsburg, Kentucky; "Phantoms of the Opera House" - Arcadia Opera House, Arcadia, Florida; "A Penny Spurned" - Philip Penny Homestead, Patterson, New York; "Possessing Spirits" - Gas Light Inn, Indianapolis, Indiana	
Overview		
5.7	Dance with the Devil	November 9, 2012
Locations	"Little Dead Riding Hood" - (private residence), St. Meinrad, Indiana; "Christifier Was Here" - Lighthouse Senior Services Caregiver Institute (160-year-old house), Naperville, Illinois; "Dance with the Devil" - (private residence), Fort Wayne, Indiana; "Trailer Park Portal" - Shady Lane Trailer Park, Bodfish, California; "Bury the Patchett" – Patchett House, Montgomery, New York	
Overview		
5.8	Souls Adrift	November 20, 2012
Locations	"Ghostly Gunslinger" - The Old Talbott Tavern, Bardstown, Kentucky; "Get the Ball Rolling" - Preston Castle, Ione, California; "Souls Adrift" - National Civil War Naval Museum, Port Columbus, Georgia; "Checked Out" – Andrew Carnegie Free Library & Music Hall, Carnegie, Pennsylvania; "Spirited Cemetery Séance" – Pioneer Memorial Cemetery, Sylmar, California	
Overview		
5.9	Once in a Black Moon	November 30, 2012
Locations	"Living the American Nightmare" – (private residence), Memphis, Tennessee; "A Very Complex Ghost" - Bonaparte's Retreat Restaurant & Lounge, Napoleon, Indiana; "Ghostly Guest" - Hotel Conneaut, Conneaut Lake, Pennsylvania; "Once in a Black Moon" - Black Moon Manor, Greenfield, Indiana; "The Spirits of Antietam" - Landon House, Urbana, Maryland	
Overview		
5.10	Asylum 49	December 7, 2012
Locations	"Asylum 49" - Asylum 49 (haunted attraction) (formerly Tooele Hospital), Tooele, Utah; "Blackford Hospital Horrors" - Old Blackford County Hospital, Hartford City, Indiana; "Roaming Ghosts of Joliet" - (private residence), Joliet, Illinois; "Soldiers of Misfortune" – USS Turner Joy, Bremerton, Washington; "Game Room Ghost" – (private residence), Thousand Oaks, California	
Overview		
5.11	Hamilton House Ghosts	December 17, 2012
Locations	"Hide and Seek" – (office building) (formerly Hardin County Courthouse), Elizabethtown, Kentucky; "Squirmin’ at the Sherman" - Sherman House Restaurant & Inn, Batesville, Indiana; "Hamilton House Ghosts" - (private residence) (1797 colonial home), Hamilton, New Jersey; "To Catch A Predator...From Beyond" - (private residence), Germantown, Wisconsin; "After School Activity" - Prosperity School Bed & Breakfast, Joplin, Missouri	
Overview		
5.12	Love Never Dies	December 21, 2012
Locations	"Love Never Dies" - (private residence), Westminster, Maryland; "Stage and Scream" - Savannah Theatre, Savannah, Georgia; "Lucky 13" - Middle Creek National Battlefield, Prestonsburg, Kentucky; "Chilling Child" - Doxford House (in Doxford Park), Sunderland, Tyne and Wear, England; "Paranormal Antiquity" - Main Street Gallery Artisans & Antiques (formerly the Hanson & Emerson Building), Sauk Centre, Minnesota	
Overview		
5.13	Beyond the Grave	December 28, 2012
Locations	"What's the Dog Barking At?" - (private residence), Oconomowoc, Wisconsin; "Beyond the Grave" - (private residence), Wellsburg, West Virginia; "There Be Ghosts in Them Hills" - Gold Hill Hotel, Virginia City, Nevada; "Sanatorium of Spirits" - Pokegama Sanatorium, Pine City, Minnesota; "Burlington Ghost Factory" - Burlington County Prison, Mount Holly, New Jersey	
Overview		
5.14	Orbs of the Octagon	February 23, 2013
Locations	"Orbs of the Octagon" - Octagon Hall, Franklin, Kentucky; "Fear and Loathing in Fort Mifflin" - Fort Mifflin, Philadelphia, Pennsylvania; "Hanging Down and Around" - Maitland Gaol, East Maitland, New South Wales, Australia; "Lulu's Ghouls" - (haunted restaurant) (former brothel), Atchison, Kansas; "Mama's Boo" - First Ward School, Wisconsin Rapids, Wisconsin	
Overview		
5.15	Go Toward the Light	March 2, 2013
Locations	"Rocky's Horror Show" - (private residence), Sentinel, Oklahoma; "House of Boos" - (private residence), Colorado Springs, Colorado; "We'll Keep the Fright on For You" - Belleview-Biltmore Hotel, Belleair, Florida; "Freakquency" - Unity Kitchener (Church), Ontario, Canada; "Apparitions and Amputation" - (private residence) (former Civil War field Hospital), Gettysburg, Pennsylvania	
Overview		
5.16	Mansion of Tortured Spirits	March 9, 2013
Locations	"Mansion of Tortured Souls"- Lemp Mansion, St. Louis, Missouri; "Haunting Down Under"- Monte Cristo Homestead, Junee, New South Wales, Australia; "Deadly Detention"- Stanford School (Third Street Elementary School), Moundsville, West Virginia; "Asylum's Shadows"- (former) Bartonville Insane Asylum, (haunted attraction) Bartonville, Illinois; "Amy's House of Hell"- (private residence), Kutztown, Pennsylvania	
Overview		
5.17	Disturbing the Peace	March 16, 2013
Locations	"Lavinia's Liar" - Old Charleston Jail, Charleston, South Carolina; "Dark n' Donuts" - House of Donuts (abandoned store), Sandusky, Ohio; "Disturbing the Peace" - (private residence), Montreal, Quebec, Canada; "Freshly Squeezed Terror" - (private residence), Brooklyn, New York; "Spirit Inn-Festation" - Farmers Hope Inn, Manheim, Pennsylvania	
Overview		
5.18	Haunting Grounds of Ireland	March 23, 2013
Locations	"Grump Dead Men" - (private residence), San Antonio, Texas; "Scare-Nectady" - (private residence), Schenectady, New York; "The Lost Lass of Charleville" - Charleville Castle, Tullamore, County Offaly, Ireland; "Growing Up Ghosts" - (private residence), Langley, Kentucky and School Bus Crash Site, Prestonburg, Kentucky; "My Name is Mudd" - Samuel Mudd House, Waldorf, Maryland	
Overview		
5.19	My Orb Story	March 30, 2013
Locations	"Eternal Time Out" - The Red Mill, Clinton, New Jersey; "Eternally Incarcerated" - Gilpan County Courthouse and Jail, Central City, Colorado; "Orbs of Anarchy" - Mount Hope Cemetery, Independence, Kansas; "Hauntingly Ever After" - (private residence), Ixonia, Wisconsin; "Psychic Sisters" - (Canadian highway), London, Ontario, Canada	
Overview		
5.20	Screams in the Castle	April 6, 2013
Locations	"The Boneyard" - (private residence), San Marcos, Texas; "Disorder in the Court" - Navajo County Courthouse, Holbrook, Arizona; "Castle Lockdown" - Castle Menzies, Aberfeldy, Perthshire, Scotland; "Don't Overlook the Spirits" - Overlook Mansion Bed and Breakfast, Reading, Pennsylvania; "A Night With Monique" - Pub Monique, Stillwater, Minnesota	
Overview		
5.21	Terror at Mr. T's	April 13, 2013
Locations	"Erebus" - Erebus (haunted attraction), Pontiac, Michigan; "Stranger in the Night" - Walker-Ames House, Port Gamble, Washington; "I Pity the Ghoul" - Mr. T's Tavern on Main, Covington, Kentucky; "Love, Haunt and Cherish" - (private residence), Ontario, Canada; "Grandfather Knows Best" - (private residence), Sacramento, California	
Overview		
5.22	The Spirits of Mineral Springs	April 20, 2013
Locations	"Stairway to Hell" - Hellfire Caves, West Wycombe, Buckinghamshire, England; "Late Fright Munchies" - (private residence), Franklin, Tennessee; "Child Asylum" - Mineral Springs Torture Museum, Alton, Illinois; "Spirits in the Spotlight" - Seacoast Repertory Theatre, Portsmouth, New Hampshire; "Children of the Farm" - (private residence), (early 1900s farmhouse), Monmouth Farm, Illinois	
Overview		
5.23	Toys in the Attic	April 27, 2013
Locations	"Shimmer Me Embers" - Shimmers Tavern, Fort Wright, Kentucky; "Just Don't Speak It" - Rensselaer Russell House, Waterloo, Iowa; "Crash! Bang! Boo!" - (private residence), (outside) Milwaukee, Wisconsin; "Farmer in the Hell" - Aldermore Life Centre, Coventry, West Midlands, England; "Haunting Molly" - John Johnston House, Sault Ste. Marie, Michigan	
Overview		
5.24	The Black Mass	May 4, 2013
Locations	"The Emmittyville Horror" - Emmitt House, Waverly, Ohio; "The Wind Whispers Mary" - Bundanoon Hotel, Bundanoon, New South Wales, Australia; "Dances with Ghosts" – The Broken Bit Restaurant, Coarsegold, California; "Dead's Best Friend" – (private residence), (on the Forge River), Mastic, New York; "Boo Kind Rewind" – (private residence), Union City, Ohio	
Overview		
5.25	Disembodied Voices	May 11, 2013
Locations	"Ghost Writer" - Mark Twain House, Hartford, Connecticut; "We'll Leave the Fright On" - Palomar Inn Hotel, Temecula, California; "Fright at the Museum" - Weems-Botts Museum, Dumfries, Virginia; "Hostel Environment" - Ottawa H.I. Hostel, Ottawa, Ontario, Canada; "50 Shades of Ghost" – (private residence) (motor-coach park), Covington, Georgia	
Overview		
5.26	Something Is Still Here	May 18, 2013
Locations	"Step Town Spirits" - Chesapeake Community Center (former East Chesapeake Elementary School), Chesapeake, Ohio; "Ladies of the Fright" - Shanley Hotel, Napanoch, New York; "Cowboos and Indians" - (private residence), Galt, California; "Clean-Up on Aisle 666" – IGA Brompton Supermarket, Brompton, Adelaide, Australia; "Squabbling Spirits" – (private residence), Lewisburg, Kentucky	
Overview		

=== Season 6 (2013) ===
Note: This season is also subtitled My Ghost Story: Caught on Camera.

Ep. #	Episode Title	Original Airdate
6.1	Restless Spirits	August 5, 2013
Locations	"Black Mist at the Black Swan Inn" - Victoria's Black Swan Inn, San Antonio, Texas; "Last Call at the Cat & Fiddle" Cat & Fiddle Pub and Restaurant, Hollywood, California; "Ghost in My Bed" - (private residence), Tampa, Florida; "The Busby Bully" - Busby Stoop Inn, Thirsk, North Yorkshire, England; "Hotel on the Hill" - Mountain View Lodge, Corbin, Kentucky	
Overview		
6.2	When Death Comes Calling	August 12, 2013
Locations	"Last Call at the Farside Lounge " - Farside Lounge, Colorado Springs, Colorado; "Sour Grapes" - Franco-Swiss Winery, St. Helena, California; "The Ghostman Always Rings Twice" - (private residence), Salvisa, Kentucky; "Unsettled Settlers" - Bledsoe Cemetery, Dial, Texas; "Eternal Playtime" - Grant House Hotel, Rush City, Minnesota	
Overview	A bartender has experiences at Farside Lounge; a voice of a murderer's spirit who haunts a winery built in 1870; a phantom phone that constantly rings and no one is on the other line; a man takes a picture of a man in buckskin he believes is a soldier who died from a Native American attack while his wife encounters a doppelganger; the ghost of a mentally challenged man's voice is heard crying.	
6.3	Misery on the Missouri	August 19, 2013
Locations	"Bad Will Hunting" - Wellington Junior High School, Wellington, Kansas; "Shapeshifter Showdown" - (private residence), Kingsville, Missouri; "Little Ghosts on the Prairie" - Kendrick House, Carthage, Missouri; "Liberating Spirits" - Liberty Cemetery, Liberty, Arizona; "You've Been Warned" - (private residence), Hastings, Nebraska	
Overview		
6.4	Photographs of Phantoms	August 26, 2013
Locations	"Afterlife Without Parole" - Missouri State Penitentiary, Jefferson City, Missouri; "The Mothman Cometh" - Ramtha's School of Enlightenment, Yelm, Washington; "The Ghost That Rocks the Cradle" - (private residence), Hoosick Falls, New York; "Do Not Disturb" - Grenville Hotel, Bay Head, New Jersey; "Nine Lives, Husband & Wives" - Aldrich Home (private residence), Greenwood, South Carolina	
Overview		
6.5	Scared to Death	September 7, 2013
Locations	"Occurrence at Goat Man Bridge" - Old Altman Bridge ("Goat Man Bridge"), Denton, Texas; "Saloon of Lost Souls" - Durango's Saloon, Boyertown, Pennsylvania; "The Enchanted Castle" - I.W.P. Buchanan House (private residence), Lebanon, Tennessee; "History Never Dies" - John Wornall House, Kansas City, Missouri; "Masion of the Macabre" - (private residence), Marceline, Missouri	
Overview		
6.6	Darker Than the Shadows	September 14, 2013
Locations	"Post Mortem Clinic" - Harmony Gardens Nursery (former Trivette Clinic), Harmony, North Carolina; "The Girl in the Window" - (private residence), La Puente, California; "The Mist and the Pendulum" - (private residence), Fitchburg, Massachusetts; "Soul Asylum" - Sek Fear Factory Asylum (aka: "The Asylum") (haunted attraction) (former nursing home), Chetopa, Kansas; "The Taking of Bowling Green" - Tea Squares (Civil War-ear building), Bowling Green, Kentucky	
Overview		
6.7	The Ghost Box	September 21, 2013
Locations	"Pupils in Purgatory" - Mentz Hotel (former Baulch Junior School for Boys), Park City, Kentucky; "Out of the Shadows" - Poasttown Elementary School, Middletown, Ohio; "From Whispers to a Scream" - Whispers Estate, Mitchell, Indiana; "Side Pocket Spirits" - Buffalo Billiards (building dating back to the 1800s), Austin, Texas; "Where There's Smoke, There's Fear" - The Galax Smokehouse (old paramedical company), Galax, Virginia	
Overview		
6.8	Bloodcurdling	September 28, 2013
Locations	"Catch the Mist, Catch the Myth" - Lakeland Asylum at E.P. "Tom" Sawyer State Park, Louisville, Kentucky; "Child Killer" - (private residence) and Hines Park Woods, Westland, Michigan; "The Gropes of Wrath" - (private historic building), Kampsville, Illinois; "A Hooker's Revenge" - Old Washoe Club, Virginia City, Nevada; "Copy Cat Ghost" - Zip Printing (140-year-old building) (former brothel), Bethel, Ohio	
Overview		

== See also ==
- Ghost hunting
- List of ghost films
- List of reportedly haunted locations
- Paranormal television

=== Similar TV programs ===
- A Haunting
- Celebrity Ghost Stories
- Ghost Adventures
- Ghost Hunters
- Ghost Hunters International
- Ghost Lab
- Ghost Stories (2009 TV series)
- Haunted History
- Most Haunted
- Most Terrifying Places in America
- Paranormal State
