= Ivan Stancioff =

Ivan Dimitrov Stancioff (December 17, 1897 – July 28, 1972) was a Bulgarian diplomat.

Ivan Stancioff was born to Bulgarian diplomat and politician Dimitar Stanchov and French/Bulgarian countess Anne de Grenaud, Ivan was the fourth of five children of his parents, including Nadejda Stancioff.

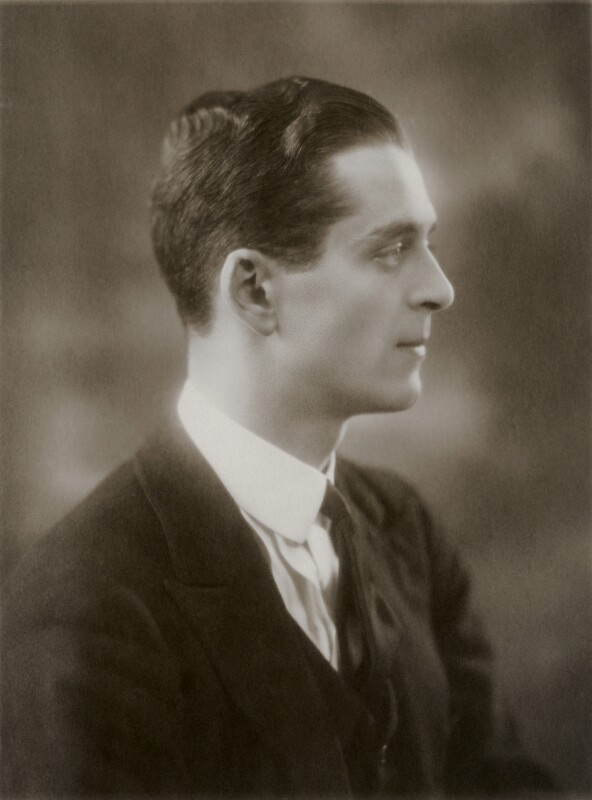
Portrait of Ivan D. Stancioff by Bassano Ltd, bromide print, 1924. NPG x84846

== Life ==
Stancioff's life began in Saint Petersburg, Russia, where his father, Dimitar, had been appointed diplomatic agent of Bulgaria to the Court of Tsar Nicholas II.

After spending most of his youth accompanying his father at his different diplomatic posts in Russia (until 1907) and then in France (1908–1915), Stancioff received his first mission from Major Hristo Lukov as translator to the local Bulgarian troops and the recently arrived Anglo-French troops (October 6, 1918) within Bulgaria.

After the First World War, he followed the family as they moved to London, where his father, Dimitar, had been appointed Minister to Great Britain.

In London, Stancioff met his life-long love Carolyn Marion Mitchell and they were married on February 17, 1925, at the Brompton Oratory. Together, they had seven children, Dimitar, Anne, Ivan, Feodora, Peter, Nadejda, and Andrew.

Stancioff served as Consul General of Bulgaria to Rome from 1931 to 1936, as consul general in Galatz to Bessarabia from 1942 to 1944, and briefly as Consul General in Istanbul, Turkey at the end of 1944 before fleeing war-torn Eastern Europe for the United States, where he settled with his wife and seven children in 1946 in Urbana, Maryland, at Landon House.

Stancioff died July 28, 1972, and is buried at Saint Ignatius Church in Urbana, Maryland.
