= Landon House =

Historic house in Maryland, United States

- Stancioff House
- U.S. National Register of Historic Places
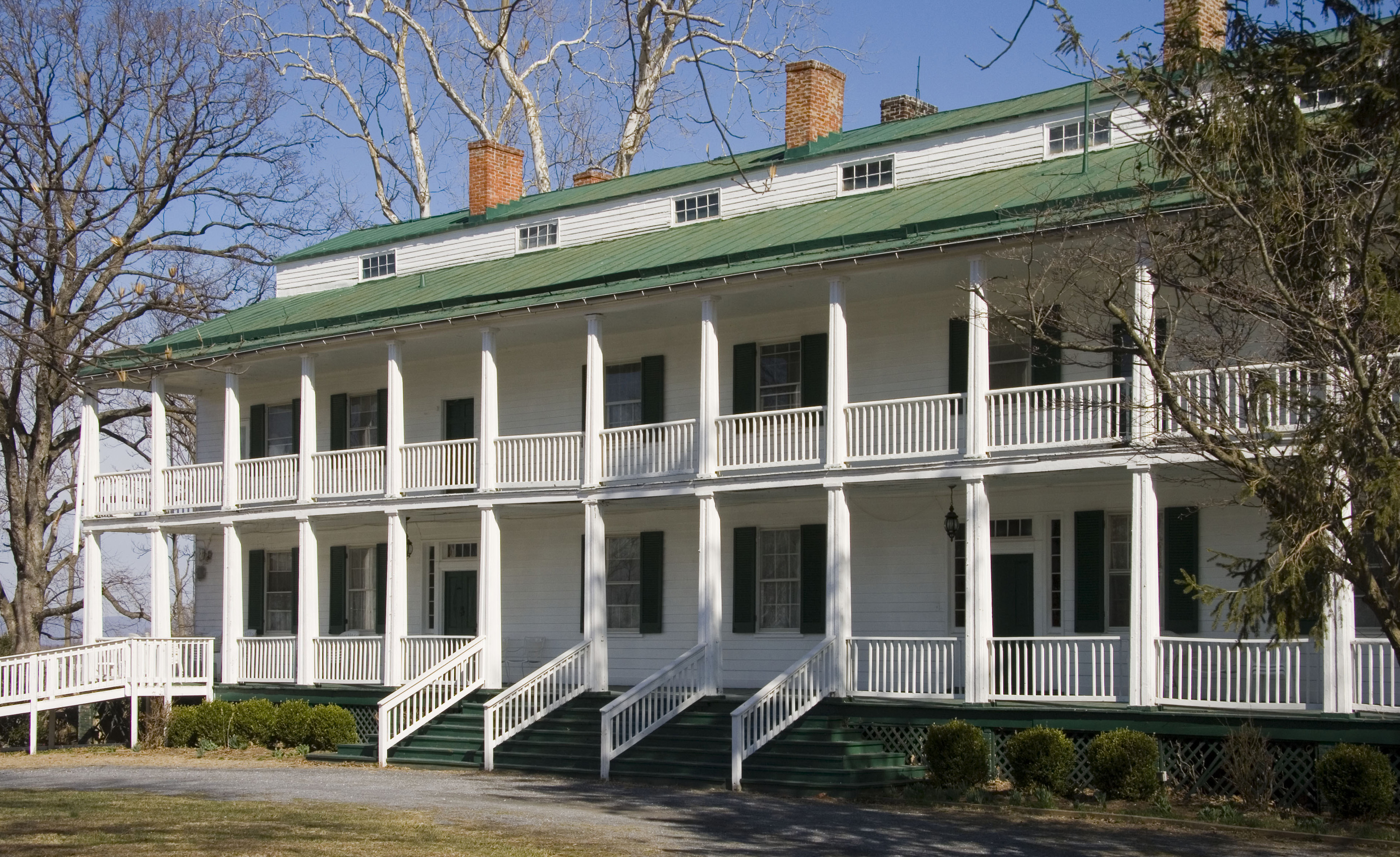

- Location within Maryland Location within the United States
- Location: 3401 Urbana Pike (MD 355), Urbana, Maryland
- Coordinates: 39°19′39″N 77°21′6″W
- Area: 14 acres (5.7 ha)
- Built: 1849
- Architectural style: Greek Revival
- NRHP reference No.: 75000896
- Added to NRHP: April 23, 1975

The Landon House, also known as the Stancioff House, is a historic home located at Urbana, Frederick County, Maryland, United States. It was built about 1849 and is a large three-story frame house with a notable clerestory roof and a two-story full-length galleried porch. The home's interior woodwork is simple Greek Revival style. The former smokehouse has been converted to a chapel. The house is said to have originally stood on the Rappahannock River near Fredericksburg, Virginia, and moved to its present location in 1846 at the direction of the Reverend R.H. Phillips. It has been used as both a school and a private home. Reverend Phillips established a Female Seminary here between 1846 and 1850, then became a military institute for boys, and by the end of the 1850s it had resumed its role as a Female Seminary. It was used by the 155th Pennsylvania Volunteers as a resting point for Union Troops marching toward the Battle of Antietam on September 16, 1862. The house would host a cotillion ball for Confederate soldiers before becoming a field hospital during the Civil War. During 2013 the building was purchased by new owners who have plans to restore it to its Civil War state.

The house was listed as the Stancioff House on the National Register of Historic Places in 1975. The building is located on the Antietam Campaign Civil War Trail.

== Building and rebuilding ==
The Landon House was originally built in 1754 near the Rappahannock River in Virginia. In 1846 the building was transported by barge to Georgetown before being moved again via the Potomac to Point of Rocks. During the move, the house was added onto, eventually having 40 rooms. The property it currently sits on is about 6 acres in size.

Denis Supercynski, with the Frederick County Planning Department, has said that even though some of the material for the building possibly came from other buildings, something which was common at the time, there was "no precise evidence" of the building having been moved.

== Uses over the years ==
Over the years the Landon house has been used for a variety of purposes. When it was first built it was used as a silk mill. After being rebuilt it was used as a schoolhouse for girls. In 1854 it was transformed into the Landon Military Academy run by Robert C. Jones.

The building was the site of a notable ball in 1862. The building was used as a field hospital.

== Civil War ==
On 8 September 1862 Confederate Gen. J. E. B. Stuart was walking, after having eaten with a local family at their invitation, when he discovered Landon House, (at the time known as the Landon Female Academy). The building was unoccupied at the time. While exploring the house, Stuart discovered a ballroom on the east end. Stuart felt the need for a break from the war and decided to hold a ball there that night to give his men and himself a rest from the war. The ballroom was decorated with flags and roses for the ball. Music was provided by the 18th Mississippi Cavalry's regimental band. Ladies living in Urbana were invited to attend. The ball became known as the Sabers and Roses Ball.

During the ball, a report came in that Union cavalry was nearby in Hyattstown and heading towards Urbana. The festivities stopped and Stuart and his men left for the picket posts in Hyattstown that were threatened by Union cavalry. When they arrived, they discovered that the Union soldiers had already been repulsed by the 1st North Carolina Infantry and returned to the ball. By the time they had returned most of the ladies had left. Ladies were invited to return to the ball and the ball resumed.

After the ball, the building was used as a field hospital. According to Michael Kurtianyk, both Confederate soldiers and Union soldiers made "lightning sketches" on the walls of the hospital. The Confederate soldiers are said to have drawn CSA President Jefferson Davis and Stuart. Union soldiers using the hospital later on 16 September 1862 drew Abe Lincoln twice as large as the Confederate drawings. They signed their drawing. These drawings can still be seen on the walls of the house today.

== Modern usage and future ==
Following the Civil War, the abandoned military academy was purchased by Sam Hinks who was once mayor of Baltimore. At his death, it was occupied by his descendants until purchased by Lt. Col. Luke Tiernan Brien, a Confederate veteran and an officer in Gen. Stuart's division, who lived there with his wife until 1912.

The property was acquired in 1946 by Mr. Ivan Stancioff a Bulgarian diplomat and son of the Prime minister Dimitar Stanchov. They arrived in America with his wife Marion and their children in 1946. They purchased the home in April 1947 and it remained in the Stancioff family until July 1997. The house was added to the National Historic Register in 1974.

The building was then purchased by Kevin Dolan and used as an event venue and hosted Civil War re-enactments.

In 2013 the Landon House was purchased by Dr. Praveen Bolarum, Dr. Rohit Khirbat, and Chakri Katepalli, who have plans to restore the building to the condition it was in during the Civil War, for $850,000. They plan to open the house by March 2014. The house will be used as an event center and there are plans to add a bed and breakfast. Preservation of the building has been supported by the Heart of the Civil War Heritage Area.

== Cultural references ==
In season 5 episode 9 of My Ghost Story a story is told about Landon House.
