= Jackson Township, Ripley County, Indiana =

Jackson Township
- Township
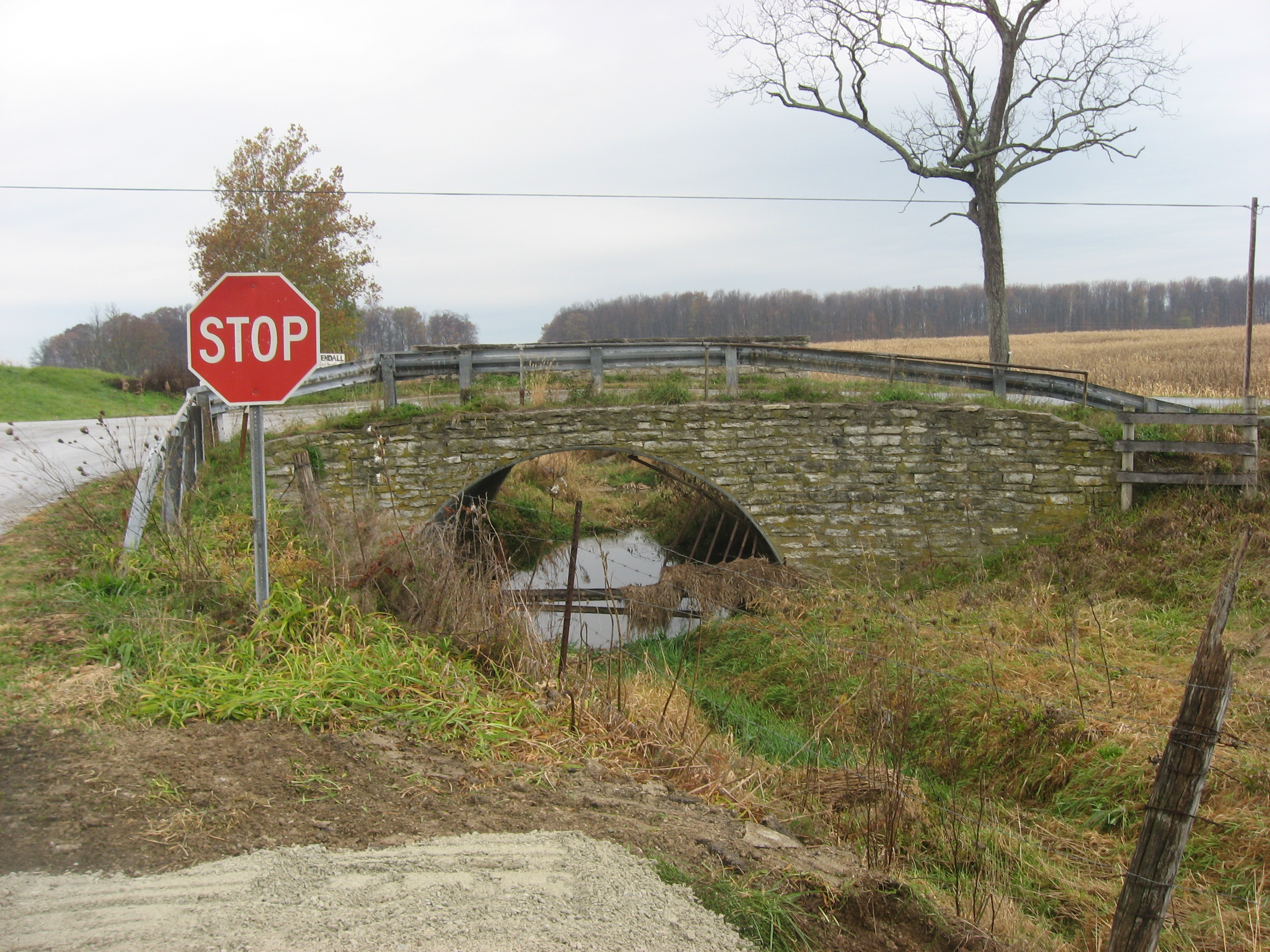
- A bridge on the Michigan Road in the township

- Coordinates: 39°12′01″N 85°22′28″W
- Country: United States
- State: Indiana
- County: Ripley

Government
  - Type: Indiana township

Area
  - Total: 29.87 sq mi (77.4 km^{2})
  - Land: 29.87 sq mi (77.4 km^{2})
  - Water: 0 sq mi (0 km^{2})
- Elevation: 948 ft (289 m)

Population (2020)
  - Total: 954
  - Density: 31.9/sq mi (12.3/km^{2})
- Area code: 812
- FIPS code: 18-37368
- GNIS feature ID: 453464

Jackson Township is one of eleven townships in Ripley County, Indiana. As of the 2020 census, its population was 954 (down from 965 at 2010) and it contained 422 housing units.

Historical population
| Census | Pop. | Note | %± |
|---|---|---|---|
| 1890 | 1,218 | | — |
| 1900 | 1,183 | | −2.9% |
| 1910 | 1,142 | | −3.5% |
| 1920 | 1,058 | | −7.4% |
| 1930 | 950 | | −10.2% |
| 1940 | 948 | | −0.2% |
| 1950 | 942 | | −0.6% |
| 1960 | 942 | | 0.0% |
| 1970 | 945 | | 0.3% |
| 1980 | 1,033 | | 9.3% |
| 1990 | 956 | | −7.5% |
| 2000 | 980 | | 2.5% |
| 2010 | 965 | | −1.5% |
| 2020 | 954 | | −1.1% |
Source: US Decennial Census

== Geography ==
According to the 2010 census, the township has a total area of 29.87 square miles (77.4 km^{2}), all land.

=== Cities and towns ===
- Napoleon
