= Nadejda Stancioff =

Bulgarian diplomat and translator (1894–1957)

- Надежда Димитрова Станчова
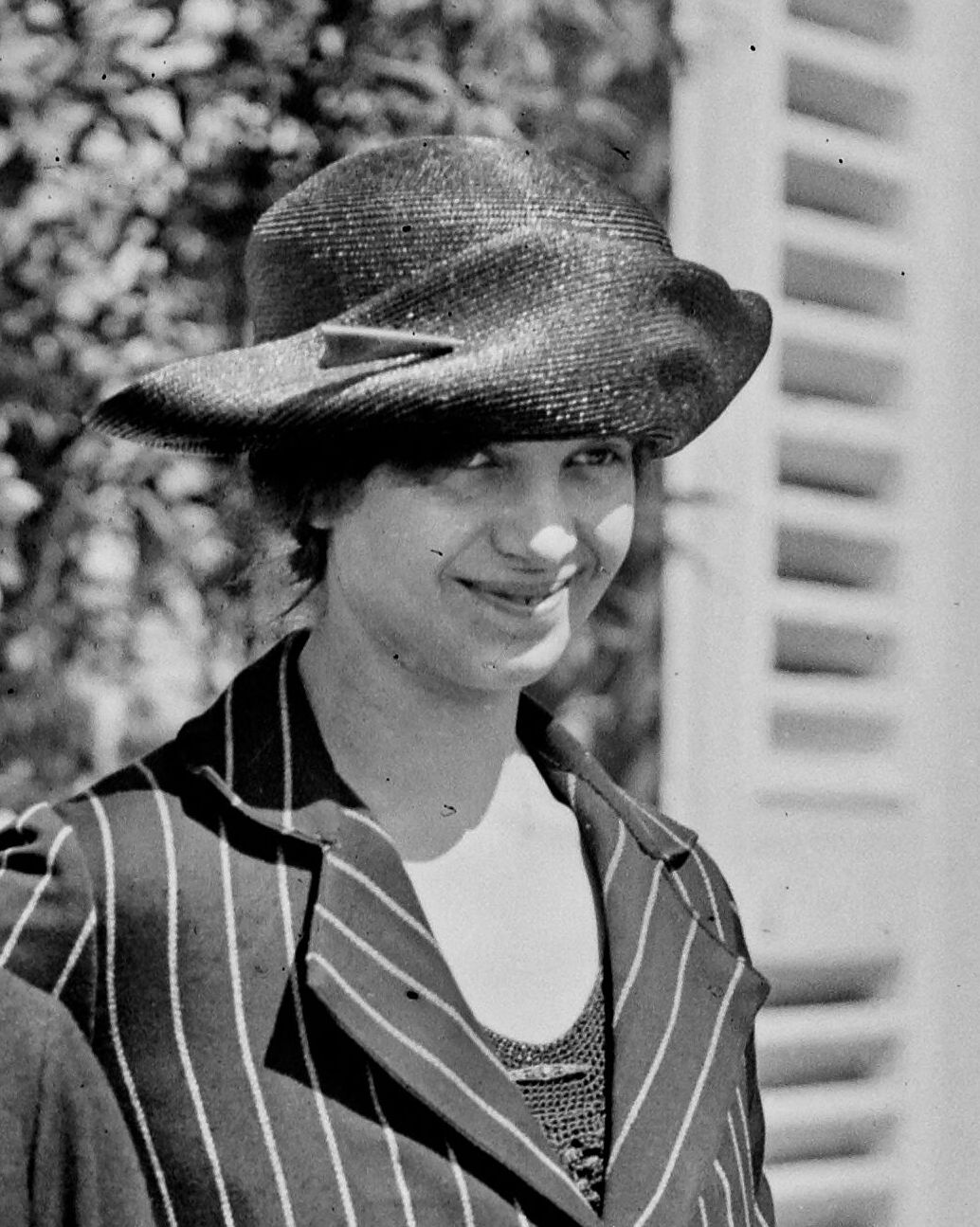
- Stancioff in 1922
- Born: Nadejda Constanza Ivanka Gavrila Euphrosyna Stancioff; 17 January 1894; Sofiagrad, Principality of Bulgaria
- Died: 15 April 1957 (aged 63); London, England
- Burial place: Blair Drummond Cemetery, Doune, Stirling, Scotland
- Occupations: diplomat, translator and noblewoman
- Employer: Bulgarian Diplomatic Service
- Known for: being the first woman to officially represent Bulgaria in the diplomatic field
- Spouse: Alexander Kay Muir (m. 1924)
- Parent(s): Dimitar Stanchov and Anna de Grenaud de Saint-Christophe
- Relatives: Ivan Stancioff (brother)

Nadejda Constanza Ivanka Gavrila Euphrosyna Stancioff Muir (Bulgarian: Надежда Димитрова Станчова, 17 January 1894 – 15 April 1957), also known as Nadezhda Stanchova Muir, was a Bulgarian diplomat and translator. She was the first woman to officially represent Bulgaria in the diplomatic field and participated in international peace conferences after World War I. She became the wife of a Scottish baronet.

== Early life and family ==
Stancioff was born on 17 January 1894 in Sofiagrad in the Ottoman vassal state of the Principality of Bulgaria.

Stancioff was the eldest daughter of Dimitar Stanchov, former Bulgarian Prime Minister and diplomatic agent of Bulgaria to the Court of Tsar Nicholas II, and the French Countess Anna de Grenaud de Saint-Christophe, Mistress of the Robes to Princess Marie Louise of Bourbon-Parma at the Bulgarian royal court. She had three siblings, Feodora (1895–1969), Ivan (1897–1972), and Helene.

The first few years of Stancioff's life were spent living in Bucharest in Romania and Vienna in Austria, during her father's diplomatic postings. She then lived for a decade in Saint Petersburg in the Russian Empire, whilst her father was the diplomatic agent of Bulgaria to the Court of Tsar Nicholas II.

Stancioff was raised as a Catholic.

== Career ==
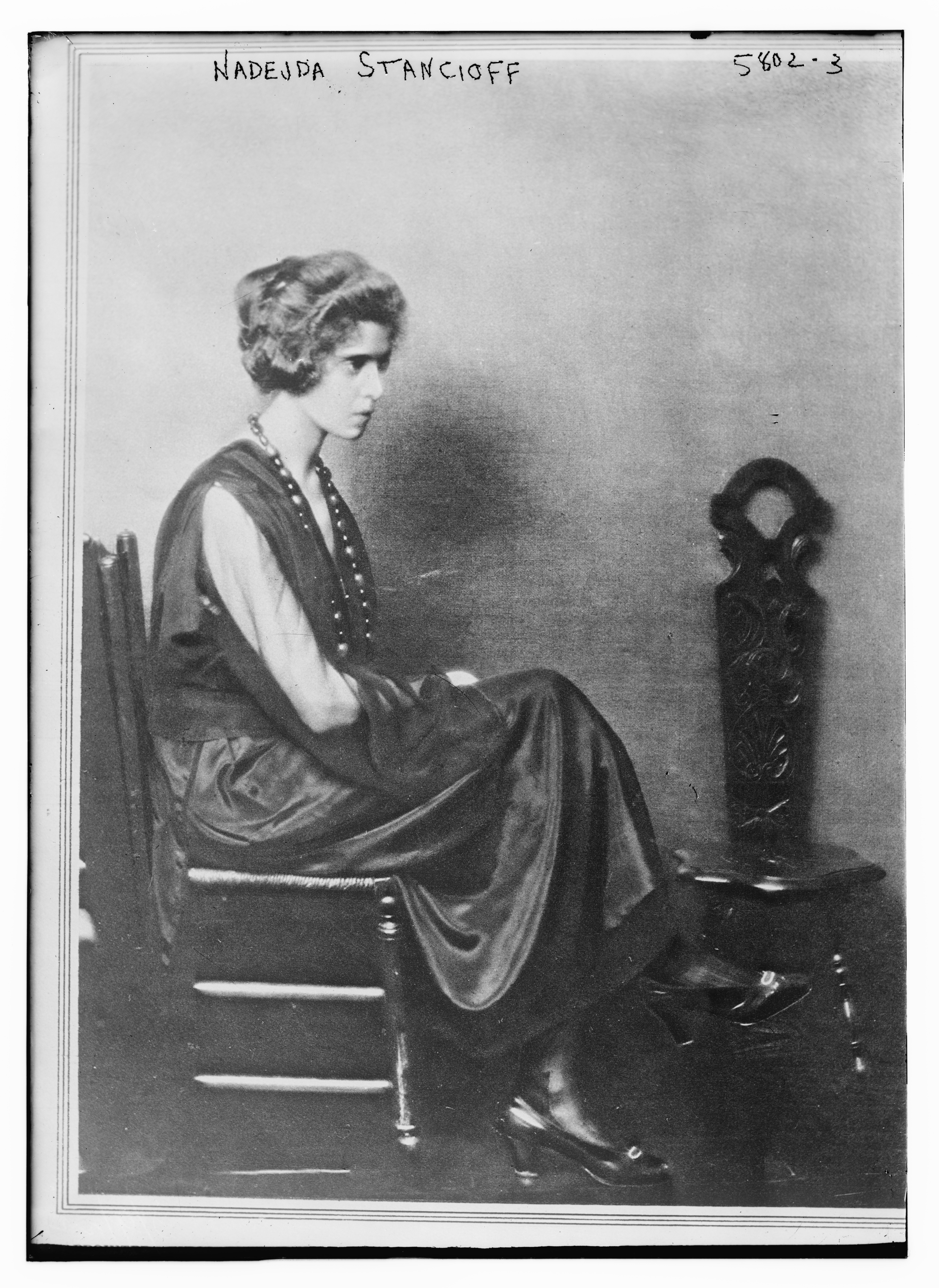
Photograph of Stancioff held at the Library of Congress

As a young woman Stancioff worked as an aide to her father. Stancioff was fluent eight languages, including Bulgarian, English, French, German, Italian and Russian. Her linguistic skills, political acumen and patriotism were noted by Bulgarian Prime Minister Alexander Stamboliiski, of the Bulgarian Agrarian National Union, who recruited her to become his private secretary and interpreter. During this period she also promoted her brother Ivan's career, supporting his candidacy for a position in the newly established League of Nations.

Stancioff served as the translator and first secretary of the Bulgarian delegation at the signing of the Treaty of Neuilly-sur-Seine in November 1919, then was a member of the Bulgarian delegation at the Lausanne Conference of 1922–1923 in Lausanne, Switzerland. According to her diary, she hoped to secure Bulgaria an outlet on the Aegean Sea during treaty negotiations and served as an intermediary between Turkish politician İsmet İnönü and British Foreign Secretary George Curzon. She became friends with İnönü, who had a Bulgarian mother-in-law. International media reported widely on Stancioff's presence at the conferences, calling her the "wonder woman of diplomacy." Ramananda Chatterjee referred to her in his magazine as "one of the most wonderful of living linguists."

In July 1922, Stamboliiski endorsed Stancioff's appointment as first secretary of the Bulgarian Embassy in Washington, D.C, United States, becoming Bulgaria's first woman diplomat in the Bulgarian Diplomatic Service. She agreed to remain unmarried during her posting due to gender prejudices, but would urge her sisters to marry well. Her appointment and spinsterhood was again reported by the press, with the Minneapolis Sunday Tribune printing an article titled: “The Girl Who Must Not Marry to Be a Diplomat: She Promises to Be a Spinster, but Washington Wonders?” Her brother Ivan married Marion Mitchell, an American heiress.

After Stamboliiski's assassination in June 1923, Stancioff resigned from diplomatic service.

== Marriage and later life ==
Stancioff married Scottish tea merchant Sir Alexander Kay Muir, 2nd Baronet Muir, on 17 March 1924 at Brompton Oratory, Knightsbridge, London, as his second wife. After her marriage she was styled as Lady Muir. Her husband was twenty-five years her senior and the couple did not have any children. At their home at Blair Drummond, in Doune, Stirling, Scotland, Stancioff and her husband hosted her childhood friend King Boris III of Bulgaria in 1927, and again with his wife Giovanna of Savoy in 1932.

While living in the United Kingdom, Stancioff lectured in England and Scotland, was well regarded by Prime Minister David Lloyd George (despite criticizing the British Foreign Office for not admitting women to diplomatic roles) and was a regular contributor to a BBC radio programme about the Balkans.

In 1931, Stancioff translated her mother's memoir "Дворцови и дипломатически спомени 1887-1915" ("Palace and Diplomatic Memories, 1887-1915") from Bulgarian into English. She also wrote a biography of her father, Dimitri Stancioff, Patriot and Cosmopolitan, 1861-1940, whilst suffering from leukaemia.

During World War II, Blair Drummond was converted into a military hospital for nursing wounded Allied soldiers.

Stancioff's husband died on 4 June 1951. His nephew John Harling Muir, the son of his late brother James Finlay Muir, succeeded to the Muir baronetcy and Blair Drummond estate. Stancioff died on 15 April 1957 in London, England, and was buried at Blair Drummond Cemetery in Doune, Stirling, Scotland.

== Legacy ==
The First Bulgarian School "Nadezhda Stanchova - Lady Muir" in Edinburgh, Scotland, was named in Stancioff's honour.
