= Petar Gudev =

Bulgarian politician (1863–1932)

- Петър Гудев
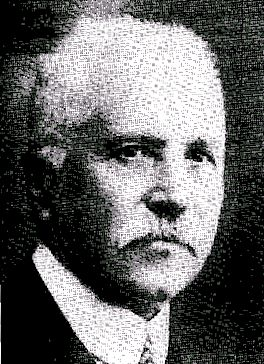

16th Prime Minister of Bulgaria
- In office 16 March 1907 – 29 January 1908
- Monarch: Ferdinand
- Preceded by: Dimitar Stanchov (Acting)
- Succeeded by: Aleksandar Malinov

Personal details
- Born: 13 July 1863; Gradets, Present-day Bulgaria (then Ottoman Empire)
- Died: 8 May 1932 (aged 68); Sofia, Bulgaria
- Political party: People's Liberal Party

Petar Todorov Gudev (Bulgarian: Петър Тодоров Гудев) (13 July 1863, Gradets – 8 May 1932, Sofia) was a leading Bulgarian liberal politician, who served as Prime Minister.

Gudev was appointed prime minister following the assassination of his predecessor Dimitar Petkov (with Dimitar Stanchov serving a few days as interim). His reign proved fairly brief, running from 16 March 1907 until 28 January 1908, and during this time he became notorious for corruption, plundering public funds for his own use.

Political offices
| Preceded by Dimitar Stanchov | Prime Minister of Bulgaria; 1907–1908 | Succeeded by Aleksandar Malinov |
