= Fat Oxen =

Historic house in Maryland, United States

- U.S. National Register of Historic Places
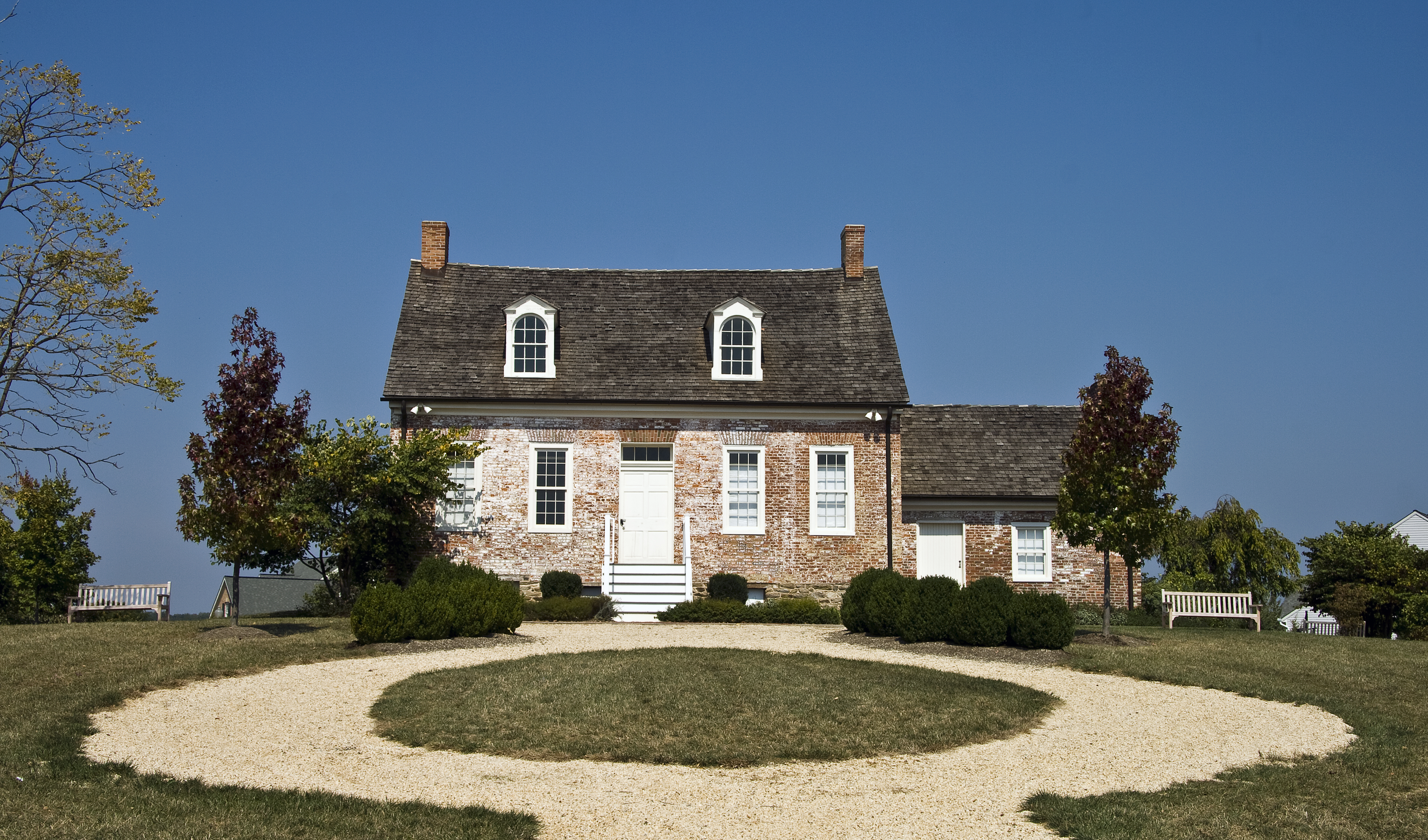
- Fat Oxen, September 2010

- Location within Maryland Location within the United States
- Location: North of Urbana on Maryland Route 355, near Urbana, Maryland
- Coordinates: 39°20′0.45″N 77°21′21.95″W
- Area: 1 acre (0.40 ha)
- Built: 1775
- Architectural style: Georgian, Georgian vernacular
- NRHP reference No.: 79001133
- Added to NRHP: May 21, 1979

Fat Oxen is a historic home located near Urbana, Frederick County, Maryland, United States. It is a 1 1/2-story Flemish bond brick house over a high rough stone foundation, with a shorter kitchen wing. It was built about 1775 and is basically Georgian vernacular architecture in style. The home is a notable example of an English farmhouse in a region that was largely populated by German Americans.

Fat Oxen was listed on the National Register of Historic Places in 1979. Natelli Communities was one of the entities that helped preserve the Fat Oxen which is now used as a community clubhouse.
