= Elias Conwell House =

Historic house in Indiana, United States

- U.S. National Register of Historic Places
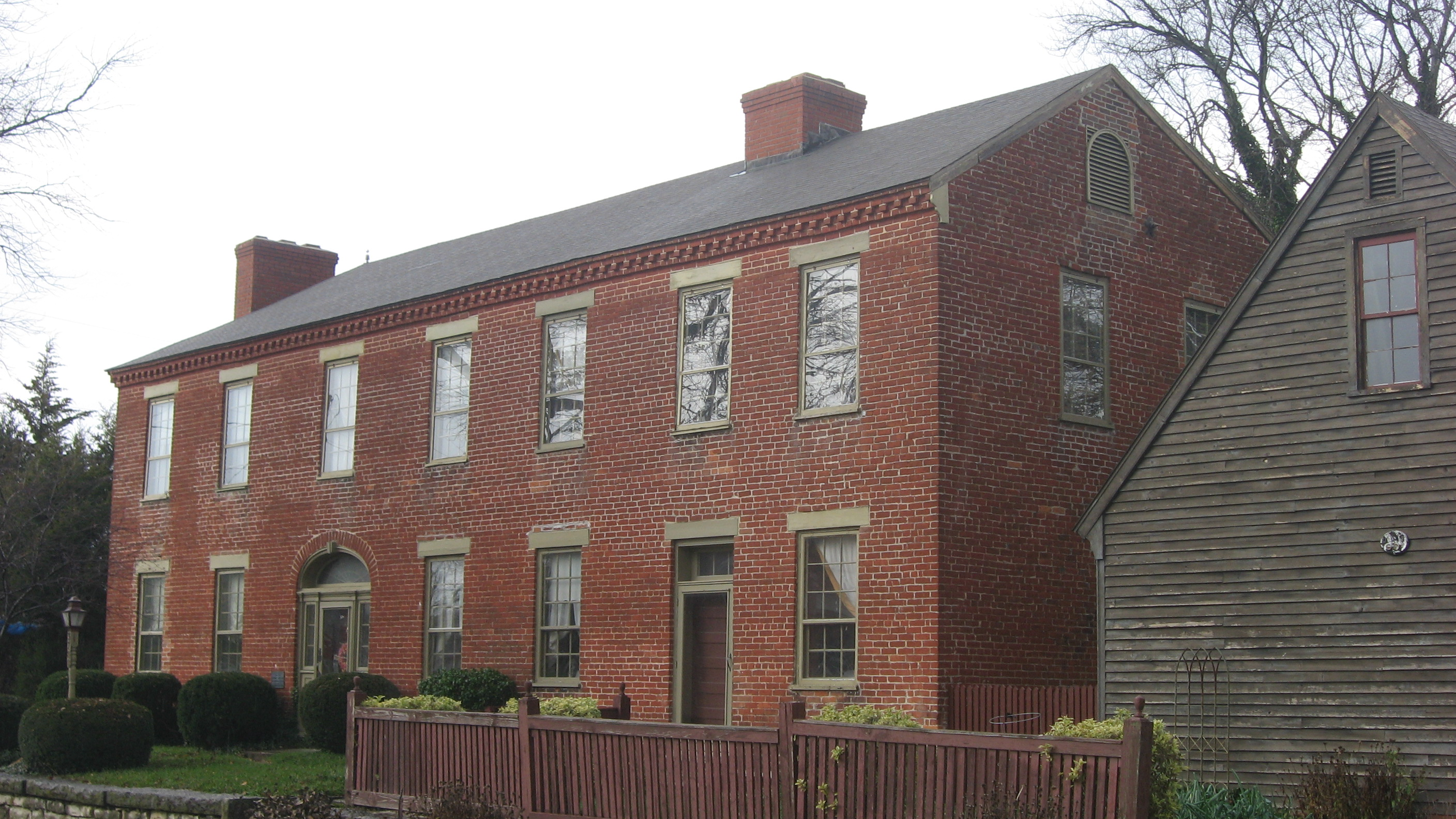
- Elias Conwell House, November 2012

- Location within Indiana Location within the United States
- Location: Wilson St. and U.S. 421, Napoleon, Indiana
- Coordinates: 39°12′23″N 85°19′50″W
- Area: less than one acre
- Built: c. 1822
- Architectural style: Federal
- NRHP reference No.: 79000041
- Added to NRHP: May 14, 1979

Elias Conwell House is a historic home located at Napoleon, Indiana. It was built about 1822, and is a two-story, L-shaped, Federal style brick dwelling. The main block has a hipped roof, and the rear ell has a gable roof. It sits on a full stone basement. The main entrance is flanked by sidelights and fluted pilasters and is topped by a fanlight. It was built for Elias Conwell, who operated a popular store at Napoleon.

It was added to the National Register of Historic Places in 1979.
