= Dimitar Stanchov =

Prime Minister of Bulgaria

Dimitar Stanchov Димитър Станчов
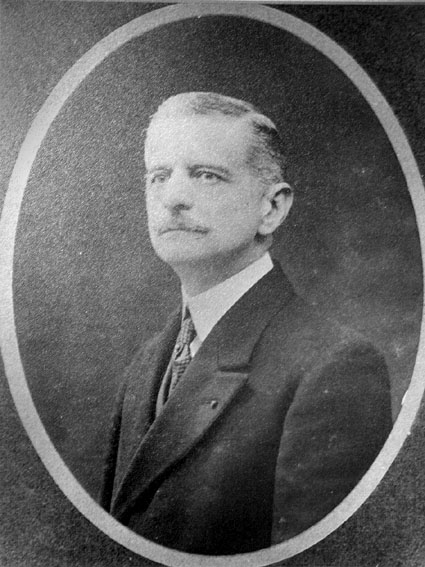

15th Prime Minister of Bulgaria
- In office Acting: 12 – 16 March 1907
- Monarch: Ferdinand I
- Preceded by: Dimitar Petkov
- Succeeded by: Petar Gudev

Personal details
- Born: 21 May 1863 Svishtov, Silistra Eyalet, Ottoman Empire (Now in Veliko Tarnovo Province, northern Bulgaria)
- Died: 23 March 1940 (aged 76) Sofia, Kingdom of Bulgaria

Dimitar Yanev Stanchov, sometimes transliterated as Dimitri Stancioff (Bulgarian: Димитър Янев Станчов) (21 May 1863, in Svishtov – 23 March 1940, in Sofia), was a Bulgarian diplomat and politician who briefly served as Prime Minister.

== Early life ==
Stanchov came from a leading family of Bulgarian wealthy merchants who had lived for three generations in Svishtov, although they had originated in Berat. The third of four children, his family was rich but non-aristocratic and were closely associated with support for Bulgaria as an independent state rather than a vassal of the Ottoman Empire. Stanchov was educated at the Theresianum in Vienna and following his graduation entered the diplomatic service rather than the career in business that had initially been envisaged for him. Both as a result of what he learned in the education system of the Habsburg Empire and due to his enthusiasm for Bulgaria's new independence under her own monarch the young Stanchov became a staunch and lifelong royalist.

== Diplomatic and political career ==
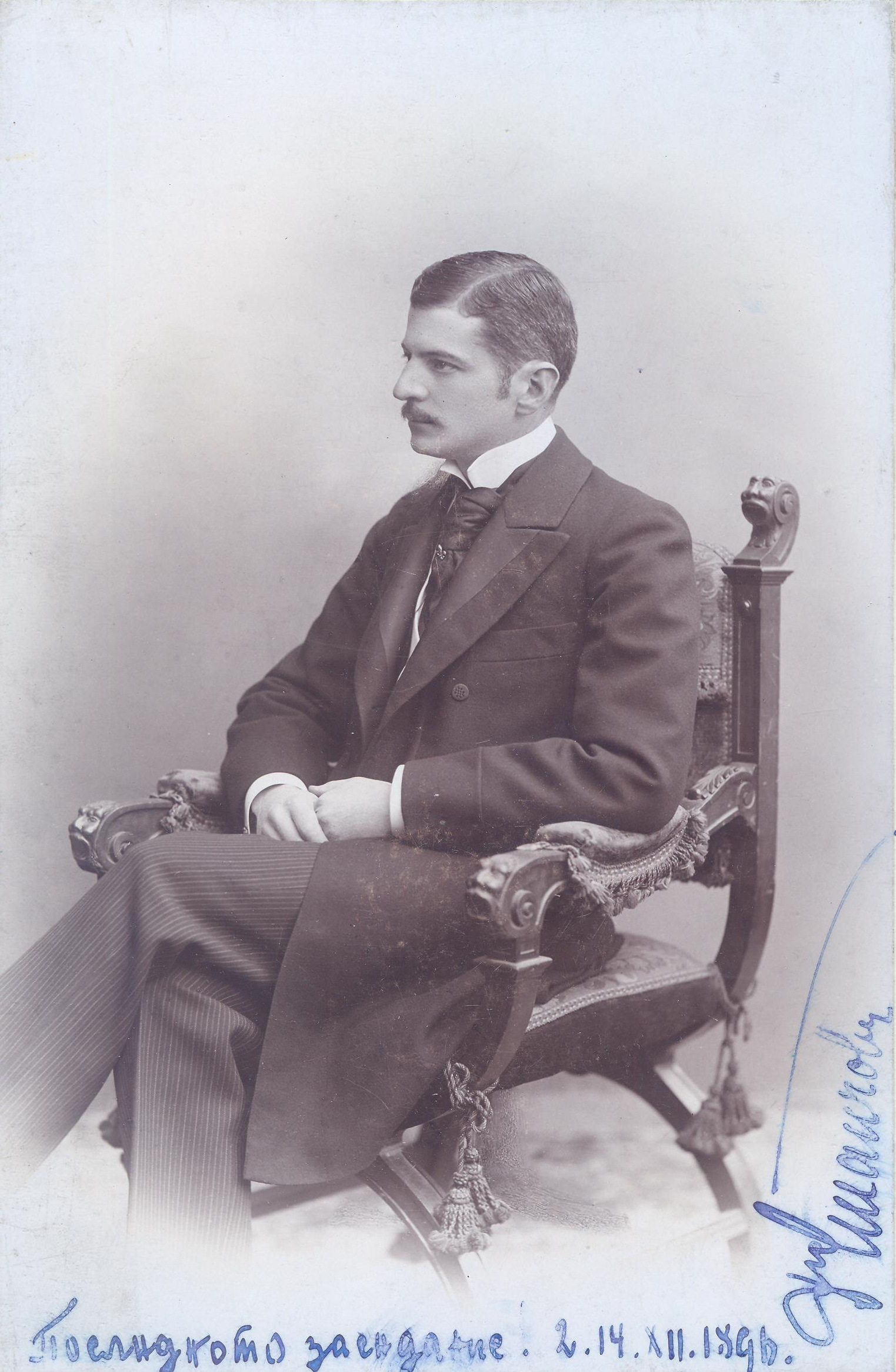
Stanchov in 1896

Stanchov first came to prominence in 1887 when Ferdinand I of Bulgaria as modern Bulgaria's second prince and the head of the Theresianum recommended Stanchov to him for the role of the prince's private secretary, Ferdinand requiring someone who was equally comfortable in his native German as well as Bulgarian.

On October 15th, 1896 he was appointed Diplomatic Agent to the Court of the Czar Nicholas II of Russia, thus becoming Bulgaria's first representative to that court. Stanchov remained at his post in Saint Petersburg until January 31 1907, when he was succeeded as Bulgarian Minister in Russia by General Stefan Paprikov.

During his stint in St. Petersburg, Stanchov was chosen by the Bulgarian Government as his country's representative to the 1899 Hague Peace Conference which began on May 18th of that year where his primary contributions concerned the limitations of armaments inherently imposed by larger nations on smaller ones, as well as Article 27, the Convention on the Permanent Court.

He served as ambassador to France from 1908 to 1915 although he interrupted his service during the First Balkan War to enrol in the Bulgarian Army. Although his duties mostly involved dealing with overseas journalists who were reporting on the war he was awarded a medal for bravery during a brief spell of frontline action near Salonika. Other ambassadorial roles he held included to the United Kingdom (1908 and 1920–1921), Belgium (1910–1915 and 1922–1924), Italy (1915) and the Netherlands (1922–1924).

Stanchov was acting Prime Minister from 12 to 16 March 1907 following the assassination of Dimitar Petkov and before the accession of Petar Gudev. He also served as foreign minister in two cabinets. He actively opposed Bulgaria's entry in World War I, for which he was temporarily removed from duty. In 1919, after Bulgaria's defeat, he was the secretary of the Bulgarian delegation at the signing of the Treaty of Neuilly-sur-Seine. He resigned from his diplomatic positions in 1924 due to disagreements with the right-wing policies of Aleksandar Tsankov's cabinet.

From 1925 to 1929 Stanchov was president of the Bulgarian Olympic Committee.

== Personal life ==
Stanchov married the French noblewoman Anna de Grenaud (1861-1955), Mistress of the Robes at the Bulgarian Royal Court, in 1889 and they had five children: Alexander (1890-1891), Nadezhda (1894-1957), Feodora (1895-1969), Ivan (1897-1972) and Helene (1901-1996). One of the couple's daughters, Nadezhda Stanchova Muir, became Bulgaria's first woman on diplomatic service during the 1910s and 1920s with her brother Ivan also a leading diplomat. In 1957 Stanchova Muir published a hagiographical biography of her father Dmitri Stancioff, Patriot and Cosmopolitan. Marion Mitchell (Stancioff) Stanchov, who was an American by birth, left Bulgaria in 1942 and eventually settled in Urbana, Maryland with her husband Ivan Stanchov . Another relative, Poliksaniia (1867-1947), was the wife of Stefan Stambolov.

A grandson, Ivan Stanchov, served as ambassador of Bulgaria to the United Kingdom and to Ireland (1991–1994) and as minister of foreign affairs in Reneta Indzhova's caretaker government (October 1994–January 1995).

Political offices
Preceded by Dimitar Petkov	Prime Minister of Bulgaria; 1904	Succeeded by Petar Gudev
Preceded by Racho Petrov	Minister of Foreign Affairs of Bulgaria; 1906–1908	Succeeded by Stefan Paprikov
