= Central House (Napoleon, Indiana) =

Historic house in Indiana, United States

- U.S. National Register of Historic Places
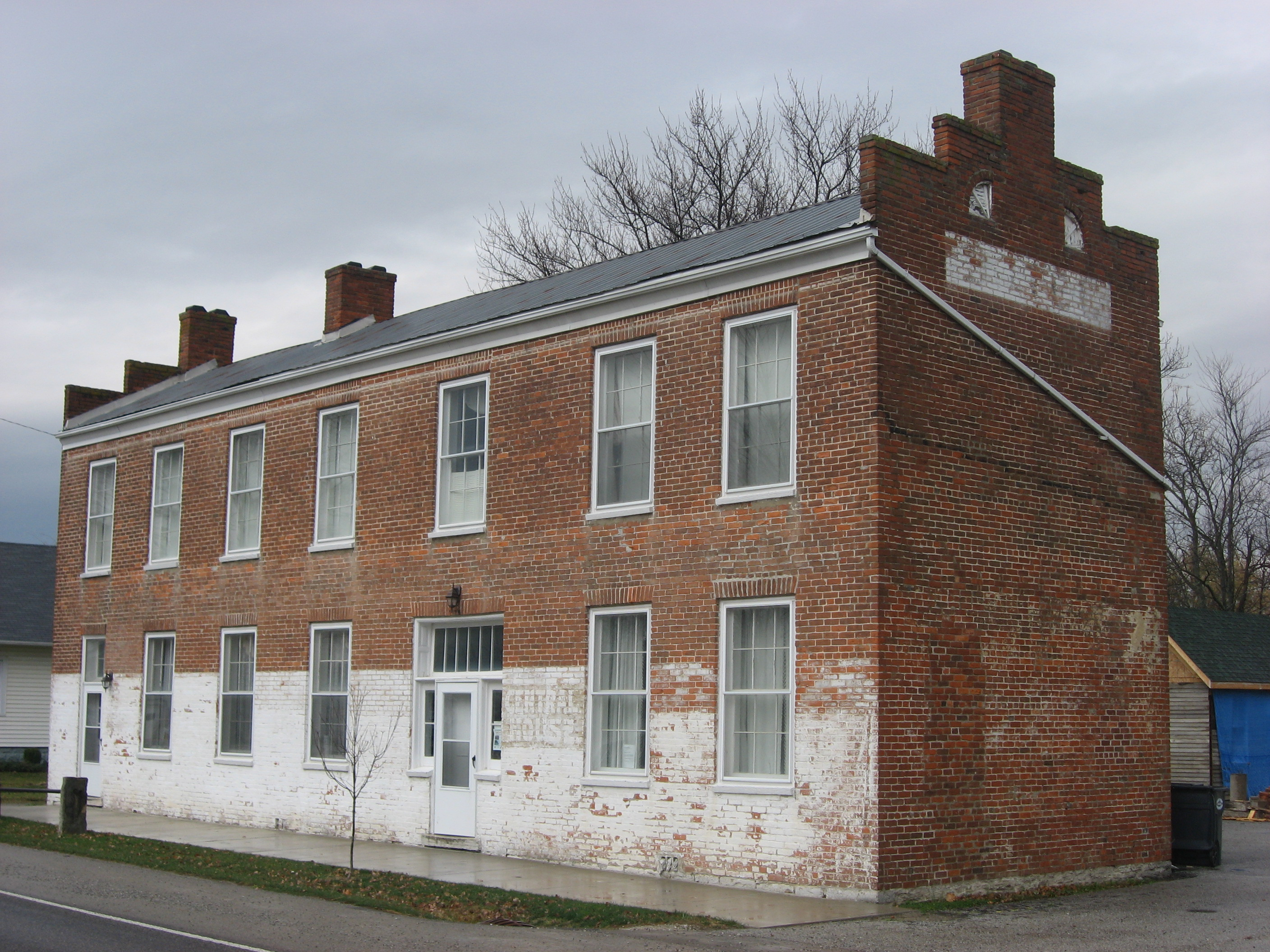
- Central House, November 2012

- Location within Indiana Location within the United States
- Location: 3684 Main Street, Napoleon, Indiana
- Coordinates: 39°12′18.3″N 85°19′41.9″W
- Area: less than one acre
- Built: c. 1825
- Architectural style: Federal
- NRHP reference No.: 82000071
- Added to NRHP: September 23, 1982

Central House, also known as the Tavern Inn, is a historic home located at Napoleon, Indiana. It was built in the late-1820s, and is a two-story, Federal style brick building. It has a side gable roof with stepped gable ends. The interior consists of three rooms on each floor. It was one of several buildings at Napoleon that operated as inns along the Cincinnati-Indianapolis stagecoach line.

It was added to the National Register of Historic Places in 1982.
