= Anna de Grenaud =

Bulgarian aristocrat, memoirist and royal court official (1861–1955)

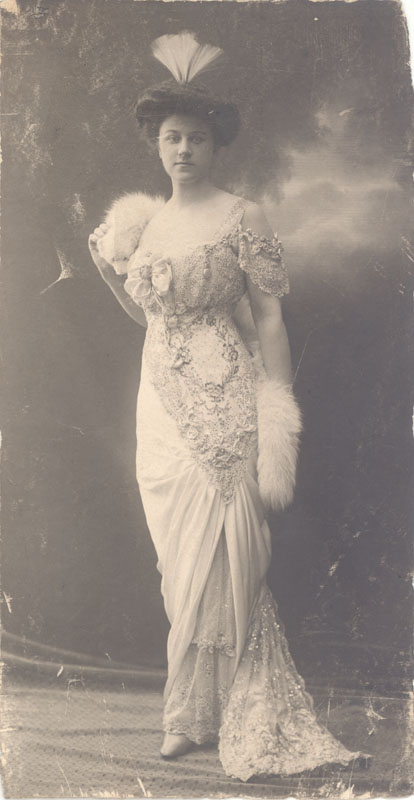
Anna Stanchova

Anna de Grenaud (1861–1955) was a Bulgarian aristocrat, memoirist and royal court official. She was the principal lady-in-waiting to first Princess Clémentine of Orléans, secondly Princess Marie Louise of Bourbon-Parma, and finally to Eleonore Reuss of Köstritz.

== Life ==
She was the daughter of the French count Alexandre de Grenaud, who served as the court chamberlain of Ferdinand I of Bulgaria. She spent her childhood in a castle in Savoy.

She was employed as a maid of honour to the French Princess Clémentine of Orléans, and accompanied her to Bulgaria, when the son of Princess Clémentine became King Ferdinand I of Bulgaria in 1887. Her father was given the office as chamberlain of the monarch. In this period of time, Bulgaria had recently become free from the Ottoman Empire. The country had no indigenous nobility, and the Royal Household and court life was something new, in which the foreign aristocrats who accompanied the new foreign royals from Western Europe mixed with the rich Bulgarian merchant and bureaucrat elite class.

In 1889, she married the Bulgarian diplomat Dimitar Stanchov. The marriage was a love marriage, and the engagement was announced by the monarch himself at a royal court ball. Since it was a marriage between a Catholic and an Orthodox, it took place twice. They had five children: Alexander (1890–1891), Nadezhda (1894–1957), Feodora (1895–1969), Ivan (1897–1972) and Helene (1901–1966). One of the couple's daughters, Nadezhda Stanchova Muir, became Bulgaria's first woman on diplomatic service during the 1910s and 1920s with her brother Ivan also a leading diplomat.

After the wedding of the monarch in 1892, Anna de Grenaud was appointed principal lady-in-waiting to the consort of the monarch, Princess Marie Louise of Bourbon-Parma. In parallel, her spouse served as secretary to the monarch. The couple had living quarters in the Royal Palace of Sofia. As lady-in-waiting, she accompanied Marie Louise on her foreign trips.

After 1895, she accompanied her spouse on his diplomatic career to Romania, Austria and Russia. She is credited with having been of great help to him and a certain beneficial influence. They returned during her spouse's brief tenure as cabinet minister in 1906–07 and Prime minister in 1907. She was appointed principal lady-in-waiting to the Tsaritsa, Eleonore Reuss of Köstritz.

She was the author of the memoir "Дворцови и дипломатически спомени 1887-1915" ("Palace and Diplomatic Memories, 1887 - 1915").
