= Rensselaer Russell House =

Historic house in Iowa, United States

- U.S. National Register of Historic Places
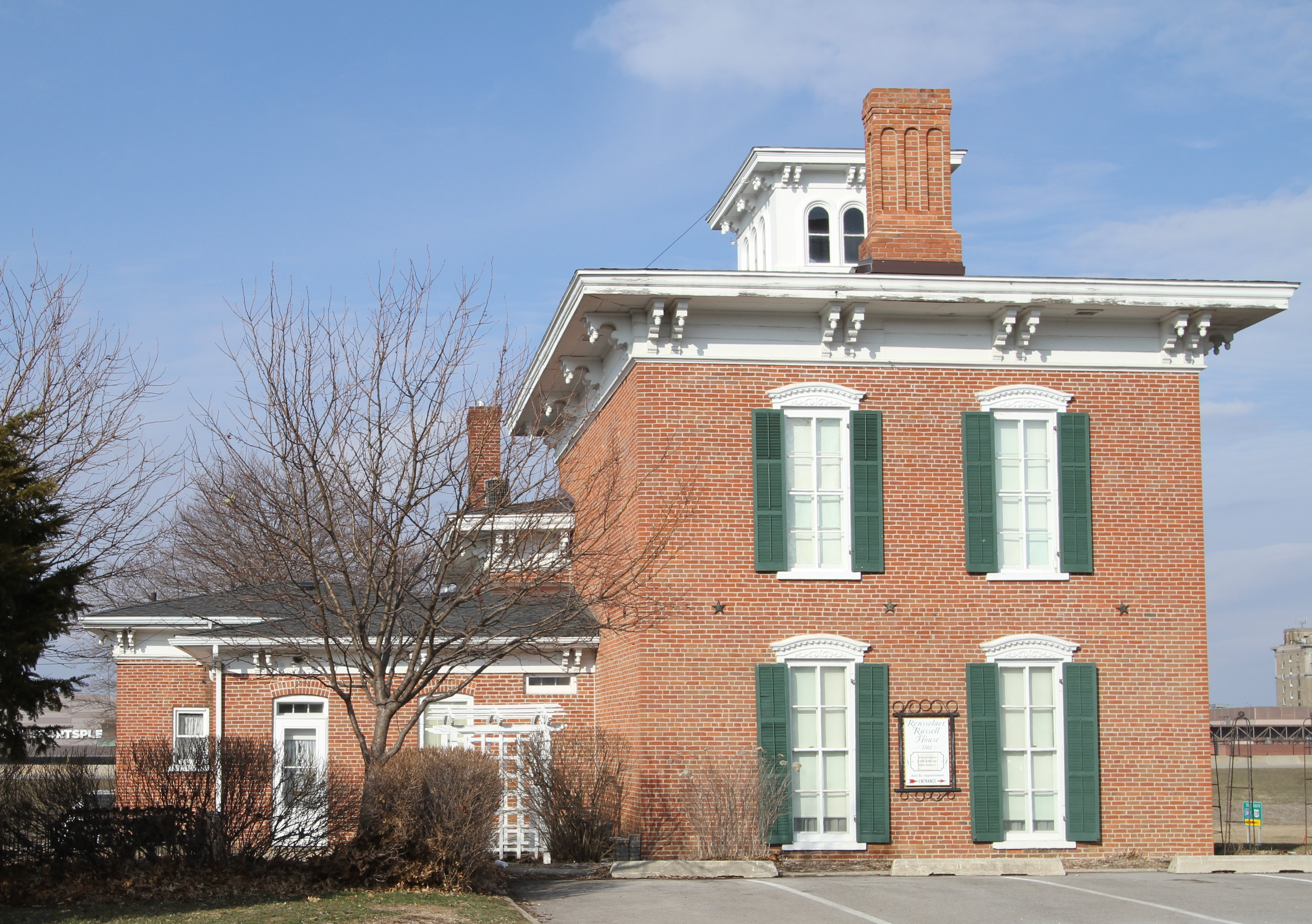
- The house in 2018

- Location within Iowa Location within the United States
- Interactive map showing the location of Rensselaer-Russell House
- Location: 520 West Third Street; Waterloo, Iowa
- Coordinates: 42°29′38.1″N 92°20′44.2″W
- Area: less than one acre
- Built: 1861
- Built by: Rensselaer Russell
- Architectural style: Italianate
- NRHP reference No.: 89001779
- Added to NRHP: July 5, 1973

The Rensselaer Russell House, also known as the Lamson House, is a historic building located in Waterloo, Iowa, United States. Russell was a real estate investor, banker, and a dealer in dry goods. He completed the construction of this two-story Italianate house in 1861. This was one of the first substantial brick houses built in the city. He had to import materials from Dubuque and Chicago to build it. Washington Square, located across the street, was donated by the family to the City of Waterloo in 1871. The house is made up of a two-story brick main block with a smaller 1½-story wing. It features a tall narrow windows, Corinthian columns on the porches, bracketed eaves, and hipped roof capped with a belvedere. The house was listed on the National Register of Historic Places in 1973.
