= Napoleon, Indiana =

- Town
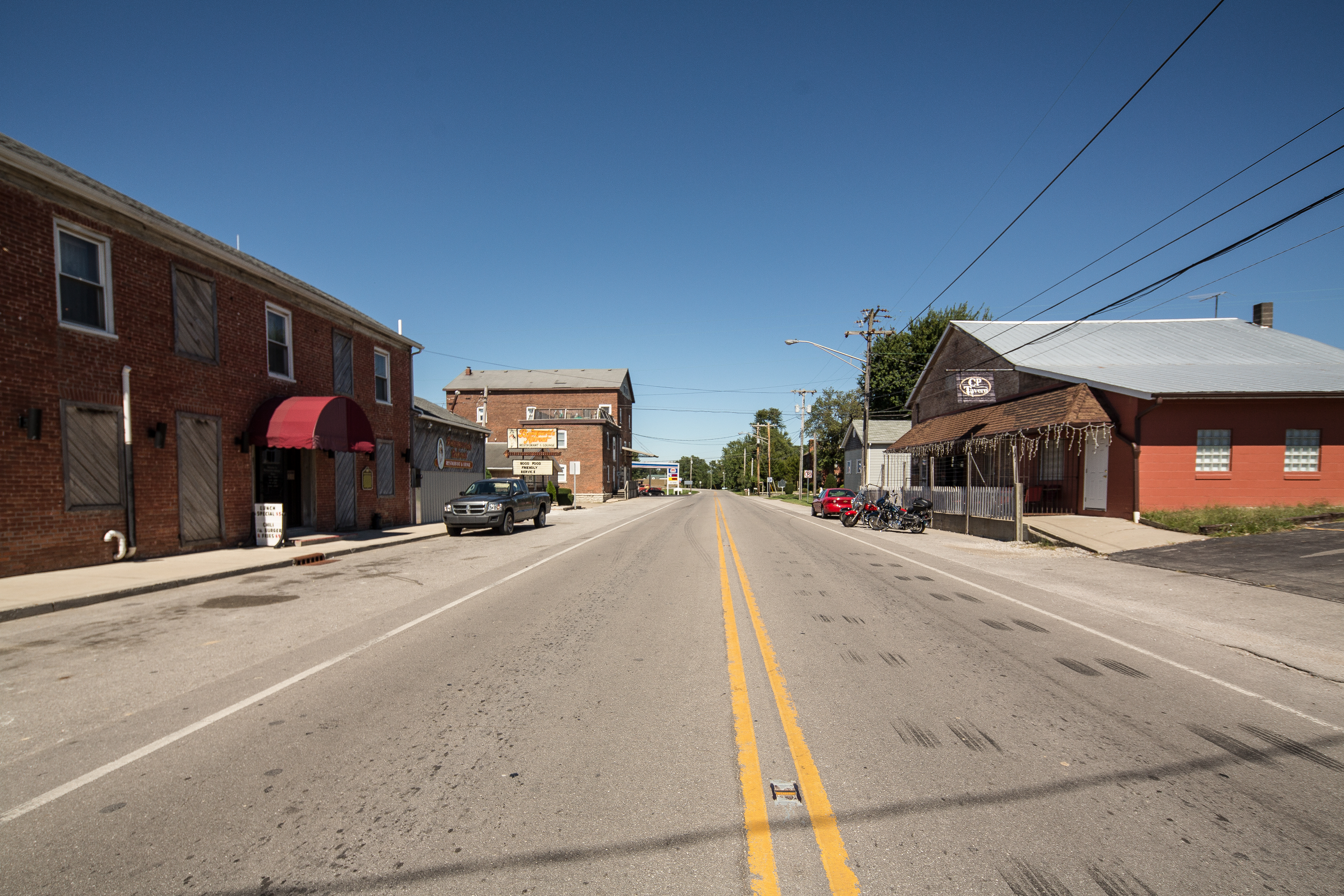

- Location of Napoleon in Ripley County, Indiana.
- Coordinates: 39°12′16″N 85°19′40″W
- Country: United States
- State: Indiana
- County: Ripley
- Township: Jackson

Area
  - Total: 0.22 sq mi (0.58 km^{2})
  - Land: 0.22 sq mi (0.58 km^{2})
  - Water: 0 sq mi (0.00 km^{2})
- Elevation: 978 ft (298 m)

Population (2020)
  - Total: 236
  - Density: 1,055.3/sq mi (407.45/km^{2})
- Time zone: UTC-5 (Eastern (EST))
  - Summer (DST): UTC-4 (EDT)
- ZIP code: 47034
- Area code: 812
- FIPS code: 18-52002
- GNIS feature ID: 2396796

Napoleon is a town in Jackson Township, Ripley County, in the U.S. state of Indiana. As of the 2020 census, Napoleon had a population of 236.

== History ==
Napoleon was laid out in 1820. The town was named in honor of Napoleon (1769–1821), a French General and Emperor. A post office has been in operation at Napoleon since 1821.

The Central House and Elias Conwell House are listed on the National Register of Historic Places.

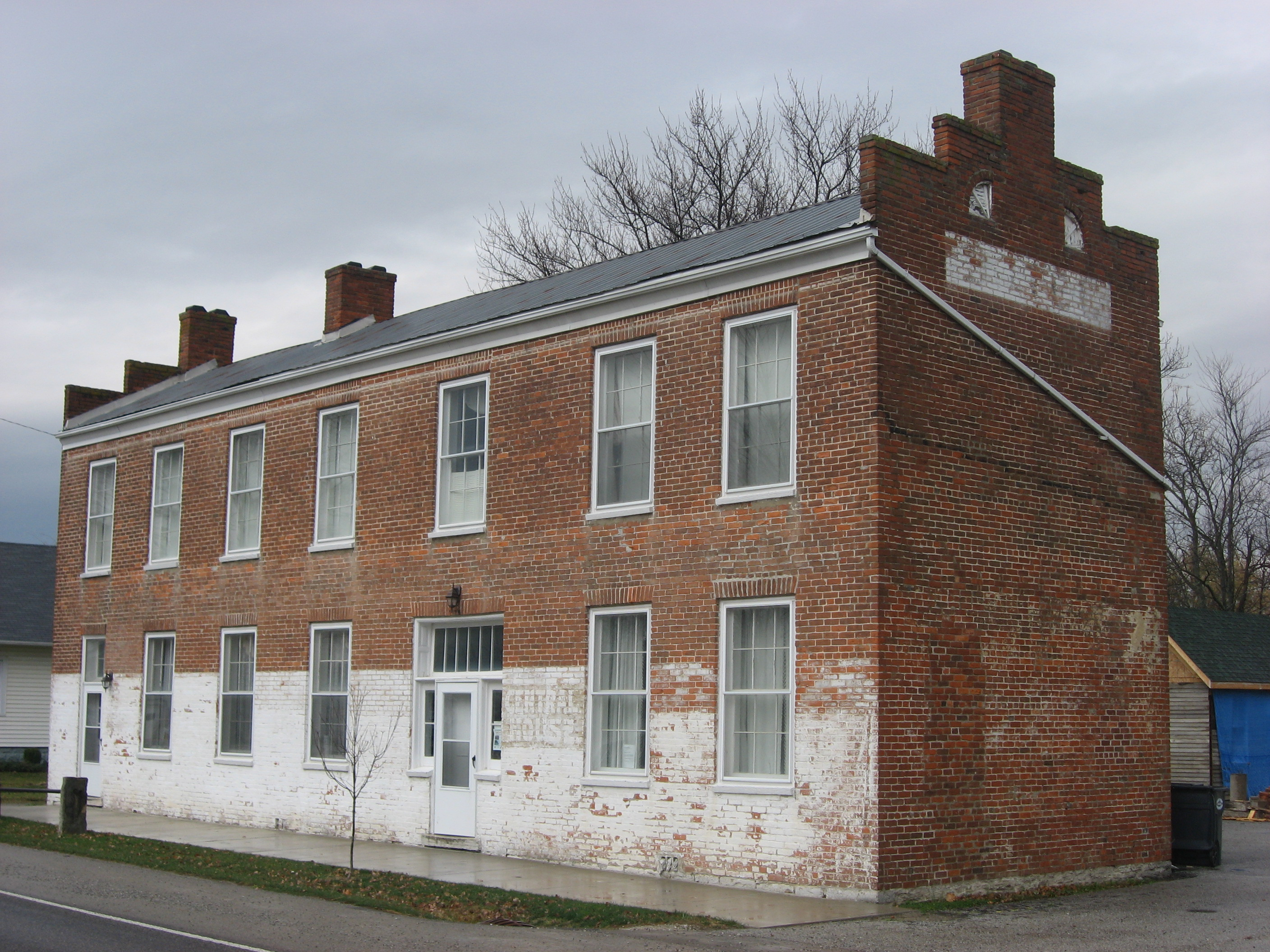
The Central House, a community landmark

== Geography ==
According to the 2010 census, Napoleon has a total area of 0.2 square miles (0.52 km^{2}), all land.

== Demographics ==
Historical population
Census	Pop.	Note	%±
1880	250		—
1960	290		—
1970	282		−2.8%
1980	246		−12.8%
1990	238		−3.3%
2000	238		0.0%
2010	234		−1.7%
2020	236		0.9%
U.S. Decennial Census

=== 2010 census ===
As of the census of 2010, there were 234 people, 111 households, and 66 families living in the town. The population density was 1,170.0 inhabitants per square mile (451.7/km^{2}). There were 126 housing units at an average density of 630.0 per square mile (243.2/km^{2}). The racial makeup of the town was 100.0% White. Hispanic or Latino of any race were 1.3% of the population.

There were 111 households, of which 23.4% had children under the age of 18 living with them, 44.1% were married couples living together, 7.2% had a female householder with no husband present, 8.1% had a male householder with no wife present, and 40.5% were non-families. 38.7% of all households were made up of individuals, and 16.2% had someone living alone who was 65 years of age or older. The average household size was 2.11 and the average family size was 2.70.

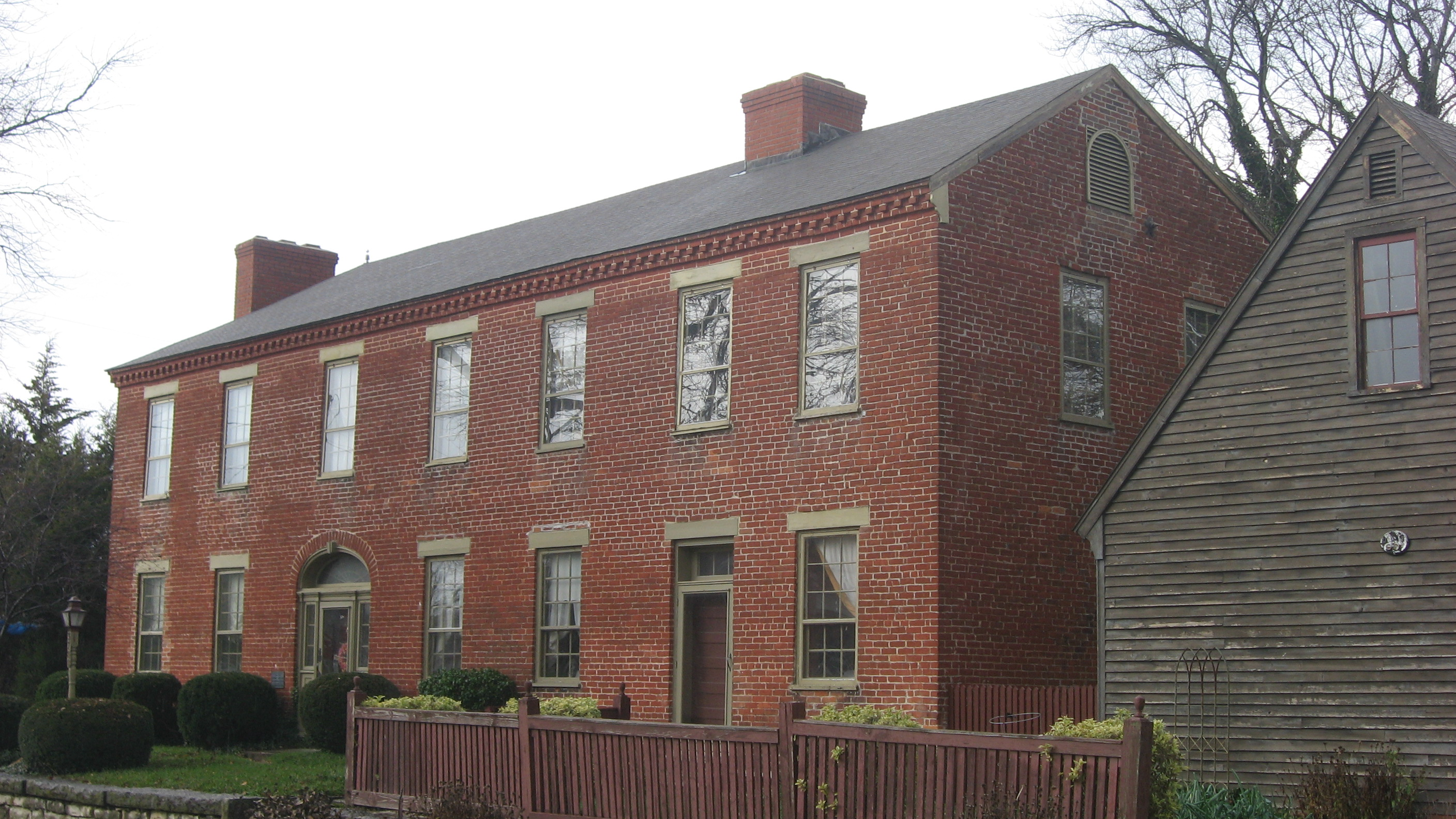
Elias Conwell House in Napoleon is listed on the National Register of Historic Places

The median age in the town was 45.3 years. 17.5% of residents were under the age of 18; 8.6% were between the ages of 18 and 24; 23% were from 25 to 44; 34.2% were from 45 to 64; and 16.7% were 65 years of age or older. The gender makeup of the town was 50.9% male and 49.1% female.

=== 2000 census ===
As of the census of 2000, there were 238 people, 93 households, and 74 families living in the town. The population density was 1,266.1 inhabitants per square mile (488.8/km^{2}). There were 103 housing units at an average density of 547.9 per square mile (211.5/km^{2}). The racial makeup of the town was 98.32% White, 1.26% Native American, and 0.42% from two or more races. Hispanic or Latino of any race were 2.10% of the population.

There were 93 households, out of which 34.4% had children under the age of 18 living with them, 62.4% were married couples living together, 14.0% had a female householder with no husband present, and 19.4% were non-families. 17.2% of all households were made up of individuals, and 8.6% had someone living alone who was 65 years of age or older. The average household size was 2.56 and the average family size was 2.88.

In the town, the population was spread out, with 27.3% under the age of 18, 6.7% from 18 to 24, 31.1% from 25 to 44, 19.3% from 45 to 64, and 15.5% who were 65 years of age or older. The median age was 38 years. For every 100 females, there were 110.6 males. For every 100 females age 18 and over, there were 98.9 males.

The median income for a household in the town was $39,844, and the median income for a family was $43,295. Males had a median income of $30,625 versus $28,750 for females. The per capita income for the town was $16,187. About 5.5% of families and 11.3% of the population were below the poverty line, including 21.3% of those under the age of eighteen and 4.3% of those 65 or over.

== Education ==
It is in the Jac-Cen-Del Community School Corporation.

Napoleon residents may obtain a free library card from the Osgood Public Library Central Library in Osgood, or its branch in Milan.
