= Urbana, Maryland =

Urbana
- Census-designated place
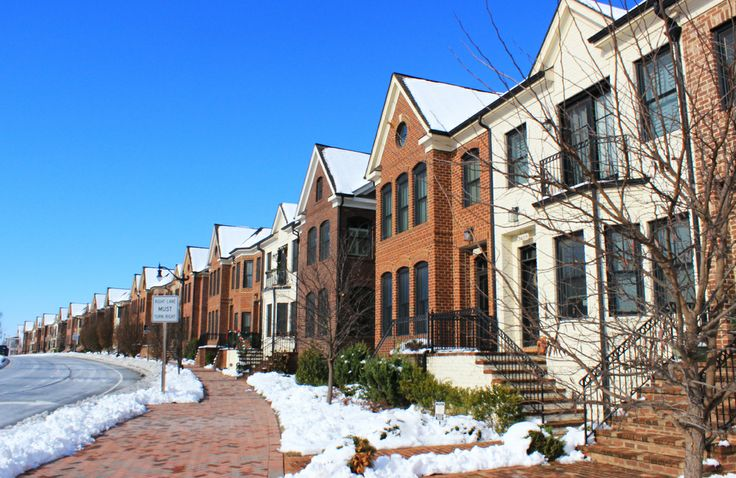
- Rowhouses along Worthington Boulevard

- Location in Maryland Urbana (the United States)
- Coordinates: 39°20′15″N 77°21′30″W
- Country: United States
- State: Maryland
- County: Frederick

Area
  - Total: 7.79 sq mi (20.17 km^{2})
  - Land: 7.77 sq mi (20.13 km^{2})
  - Water: 0.015 sq mi (0.04 km^{2})
- Elevation: 443 ft (135 m)

Population (2020)
  - Total: 13,304
  - Density: 1,711.5/sq mi (660.81/km^{2})
- Time zone: UTC−5 (Eastern (EST))
  - Summer (DST): UTC−4 (EDT)
- ZIP code: 21704
- Area codes: 301, 240
- FIPS code: 24-79900
- GNIS feature ID: 2583698

Urbana (/ərˈbænə/ ər-BAN-ə) is a suburban census-designated place located in Frederick County, Maryland, United States. It lies at the I-270/MD 80 interchange, approximately 7.5 miles (12.1 km) south-east of Frederick and about 37 miles (60 km) north-west of Washington, D.C. Urbana started to develop circa 1999 and, as of the 2010 census, had a population of 9,175. It is part of the Washington metropolitan area.

== History ==
=== 18th, 19th, and 20th centuries ===
The Urbana area was first settled in 1730.

Urbana is the site of Landon House, which was built in 1754 along the Rappahannock River around Fredericksburg, Virginia. It was used as a seminary for girls. In 1840, Landon House was moved by boat to Washington and then by oxcarts to its present site in Urbana. Landon House later served as a military academy and a hospital during the Civil War. Confederate General J.E.B. Stuart's officers held a dance at Landon House in 1862. During the dance, Union cavalry advanced on the house, but the Confederate military drove the Union forces away and the dance continued.

Zion Episcopal Church was built in 1802 and served as a house of worship until badly damaged by fire in 1961. Since 2005, it has been restored to its original condition as a museum. Amelung House and Glassworks were listed on the National Register of Historic Places in 1973. Stancioff House was listed in 1975, and Fat Oxen in 1979.

=== 2000–2010 ===
In 2006, the Urbana Regional Library and Senior Center opened on Amelung Street. The facility includes three floors and over 25,000 square feet (2,300 m^{2}).

The diverse population was named "The 2009 Best Selling Community in Maryland".

=== 2010–present ===
As of the 2010 census, Urbana had a population of 9,175 people, an increase from 622 residents in 2000.

== Geography ==
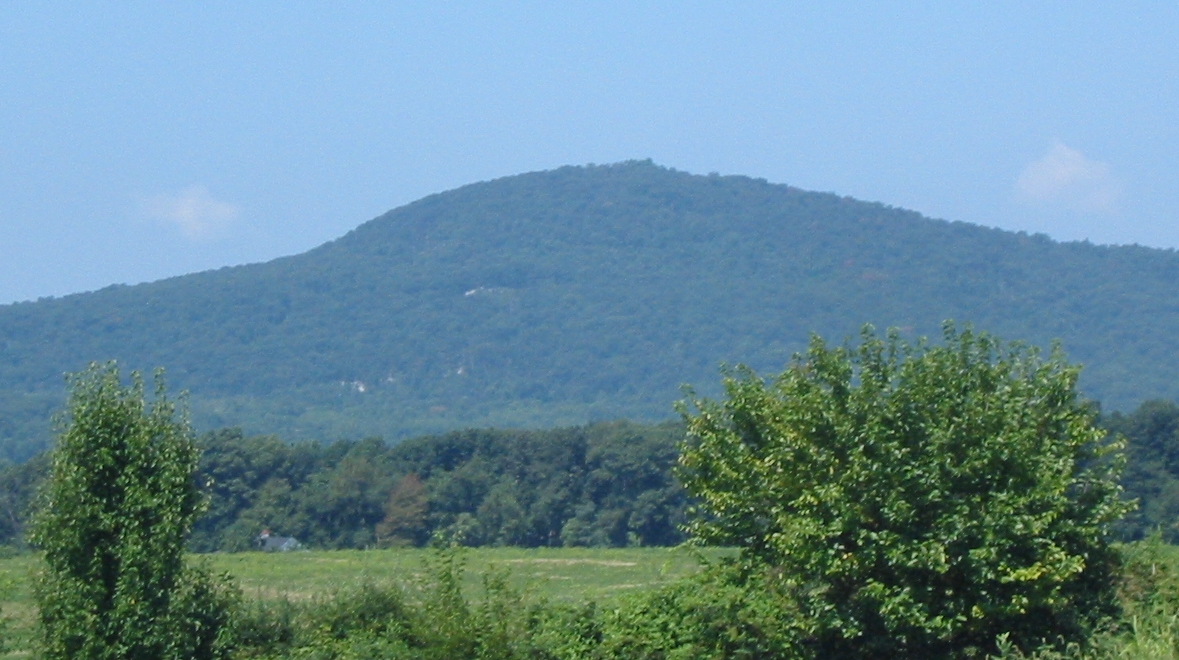
Sugarloaf Mountain is 9 miles (14 km) south of Urbana.

Urbana is located in southeastern Frederick County.

According to the U.S. Census Bureau, the Urbana CDP has a total area of 6.6 square miles (17.2 km^{2}), of which 6.6 square miles (17.0 km^{2}) is land and 0.1 square miles (0.2 km^{2}), or 0.95%, is water.

=== Climate ===
Urbana is part of the humid subtropical climate zone, with hot, humid summers, cool winters, and ample precipitation year-round. It is above the Fall Line, which gives it slightly lower year-round temperatures than cities to the south, such as Washington, D.C.

On average, Urbana gets about 40 inches (1,000 mm) of rain (April and May being the two rainiest months on average with nine days of rain each) and 25 inches (640 mm) of snow per year. July is the warmest month, with an average high of approximately 86 °F (30 °C).

The coldest month is January, with an average low of around 23 °F (−5 °C). Urbana experiences rain an average of 112.6 days of the year.

== Demographics ==
Historical population
Census	Pop.	Note	%±
2010	9,175		—
2020	13,304		45.0%
U.S. Decennial Census

=== 2020 census ===
As of the 2020 census, Urbana had a population of 13,304. The median age was 36.8 years. 33.5% of residents were under the age of 18 and 7.0% of residents were 65 years of age or older. For every 100 females there were 94.2 males, and for every 100 females age 18 and over there were 90.9 males age 18 and over.

97.1% of residents lived in urban areas, while 2.9% lived in rural areas.

There were 4,033 households in Urbana, of which 58.9% had children under the age of 18 living in them. Of all households, 69.6% were married-couple households, 10.2% were households with a male householder and no spouse or partner present, and 16.3% were households with a female householder and no spouse or partner present. About 12.7% of all households were made up of individuals and 3.5% had someone living alone who was 65 years of age or older.

There were 4,199 housing units, of which 4.0% were vacant. The homeowner vacancy rate was 2.0% and the rental vacancy rate was 6.2%.

Racial composition as of the 2020 census
Race	Number	Percent
White	6,993	52.6%
Black or African American	1,410	10.6%
American Indian and Alaska Native	46	0.3%
Asian	2,855	21.5%
Native Hawaiian and Other Pacific Islander	5	0.0%
Some other race	457	3.4%
Two or more races	1,538	11.6%
Hispanic or Latino (of any race)	1,589	11.9%

=== 2010 census ===
As of the 2010 U.S. census, there were 9,175 people and 2,804 households residing in the Urbana census-designated place. The population density was 1,411.5 inhabitants per square mile (545.0/km^{2}). Ethnically, the population is made up of 66.7% White, 9.0% African-American, 0.3% American Indian or Alaska Native, 17.5% Asian, 0.0% Native Hawaiian or Pacific Islander, 4.1% of two or more races, and 10.1% Hispanic or Latino of any race.

== Economy ==
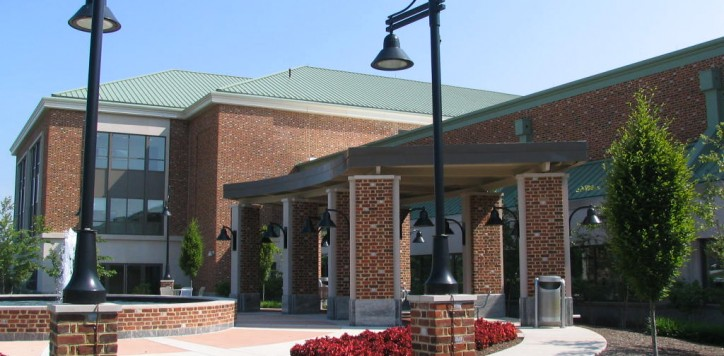
The entrance to the Fannie Mae Data Center

Businesses in Urbana include:

- The regional data center for Fannie Mae, the first building constructed in the Urbana Corporate Center. Built in 2004, the facility is a 220,000 sq. ft.

== Parks and recreation ==
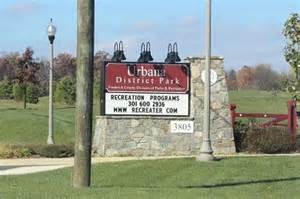
Urbana District Park in 2013

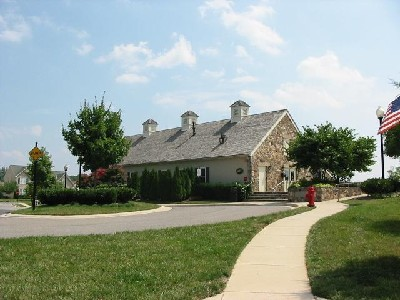
Anthony Natelli Community Center

Parks include:

- Urbana District Park, a 95-acre (38 ha) park.
- Urbana Community Park
- Natelli Family YMCA, completed in 2021, is 62,000 square feet.

== Government ==
Despite rapid development, Urbana has not been incorporated as a town or a city. It has no official mayor or city council and is governed by Frederick County. It is represented by District 2 Council Member Steve McKay of the Frederick County council.

== Education ==
Public schools in Urbana are part of the Frederick County Public Schools (Maryland) system.

Schools located in Urbana include:

- Urbana High School
- Urbana Middle School
- Urbana Elementary School
- Centerville Elementary School
- Sugarloaf Elementary School

School zoning is as follows: Each of the three elementary schools cover separate portions of the CDP. All areas are zoned to the same middle and high school.

== Infrastructure ==
Roads include:

- Maryland Route 355
- Maryland Route 80
- Interstate 270
