= Konstantin Kavarnaliev =

Bulgarian major general

Major General Konstantin Kavarnaliev
- Константин Каварналиев
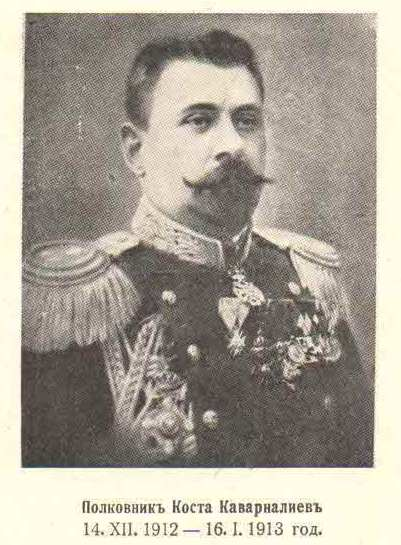
- Born: Konstantin Velikov Kavarnaliev; 15 February 1866; Shumen, Danube Vilayet, Ottoman Empire
- Died: 23 June 1913 (aged 47); Doiran Lake, Tsardom of Bulgaria (now Greece and Republic of North Macedonia)
- Education: Sofia Military Academy
- Military career
- Allegiance: Principality of Bulgaria; Kingdom of Bulgaria
- Branch: Bulgarian Land Forces
- Service years: 1885 – 1913
- Rank: Major General
- Conflicts: Serbo-Bulgarian War; Battle of Slivnitsa; Battle of Tsaribrod; Battle of Pirot; Balkan Wars; First Balkan War; Bulgarian front; Second Balkan War; Battle of Doiran †
- Awards: Order of Bravery

Konstantin Velikov Kavarnaliev was a Bulgarian major general, who died at the Battle of Doiran during the Second Balkan War.

== Biography ==
Konstantin Kavarnaliev was born in Shumen on 15 February 1866 to a trading family. He graduated from the Vasil Levski National Military University at 7s class.

=== Military career ===
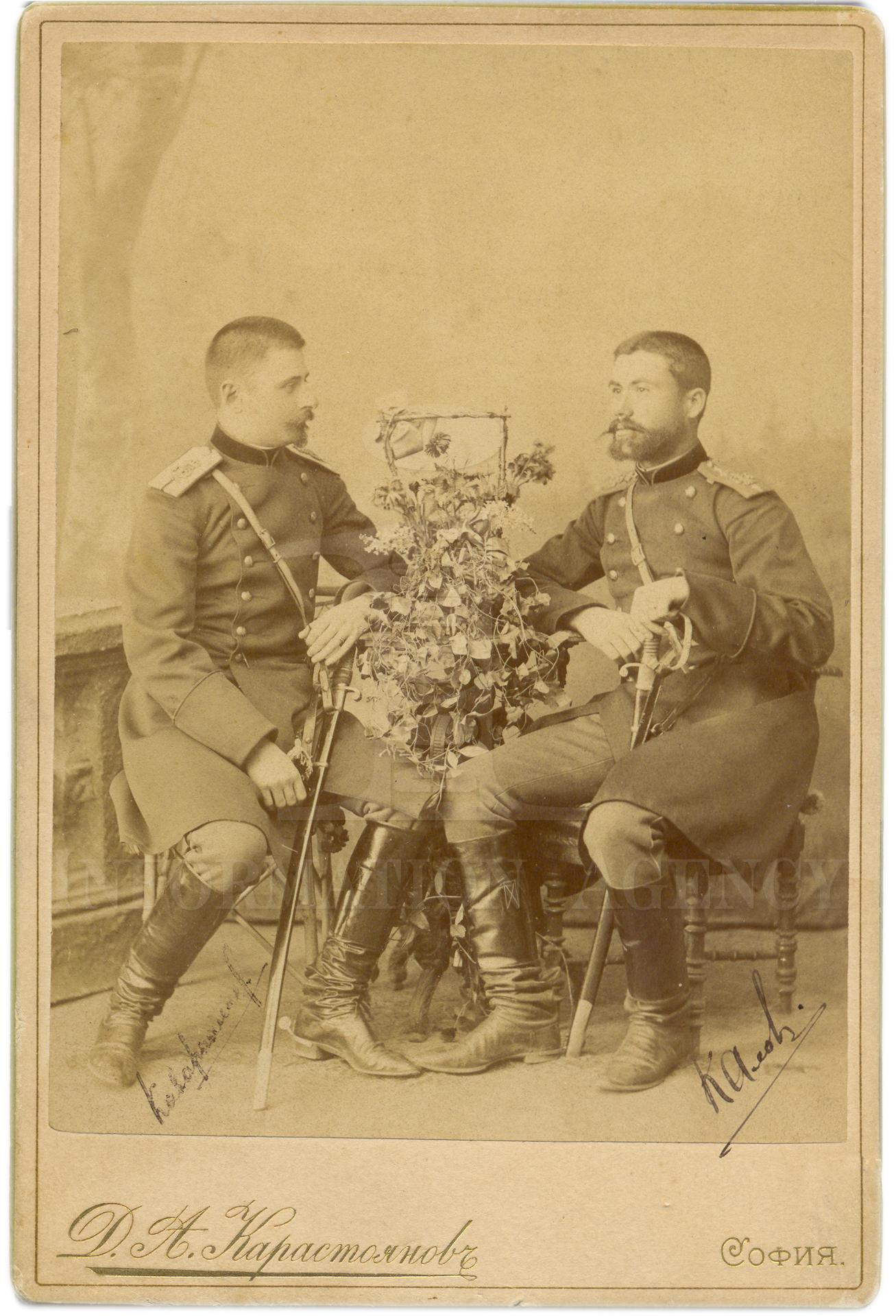
Kavarnaliev (left) with another officer. Photo by Dimitar Karastoyanov

As Junker who participated in the Serbo-Bulgarian War who commands the 3rd company of the Fifth Danube Infantry Regiment and participated in military operations in Battle of Slivnitsa, Tsaribrod (11-12 November) and Pirot (14–15 November). Manifested in battle near the village of Aldomirovtsi. For honors in the war on 3 December 1885 he was promoted to the rank of lieutenant and awarded the Military Order "For Courage", IV degree.

Kavarnaliev graduated third in his class in 1888 and was assigned to the 4th Artillery Regiment, where he served until 1892. He graduated from the Military Academy in Belgium (1897) and then specialized in Italy. He served as Chief of Staff of the 2nd Brigade of the Sixth Bdina Infantry Division. On 15 December 1907 Kavanaliev was appointed chief of staff of the Fifth Danube Infantry Regiment. In 1900 he married Elena Popova. He was promoted to the rank of major in May 1900, and to the rank of lieutenant colonel in 1904. In less than a year in 1907 he was commander of the 15th Lom Infantry Regiment in Belogradchik, and then was transferred to Ruse as Chief of Staff of the Fifth Danube Infantry Division, and a little later was promoted to the rank of colonel. During the First Balkan War from 14 December 1912 to 16 January 1913 he was commander of 5th Infantry Danube Regiment. During the Second Balkan War he was appointed commander of the 3rd Brigade of the Third Balkan Infantry Division. At that time, six divisions, personally commanded by King Konstantinos I of Greece, attacked Kukush, defended by two Bulgarian regiments. They fought for three days, giving the population the opportunity to withdraw without casualties to Old Bulgaria. Without allowing themselves to be surrounded, the Bulgarian regiments withdrew to the north. Kukush was burned to the ground and the Greek army rushed to Lake Doiran. Colonel Kavarnaliev has only two regiments which were the 32nd and 42nd, which on top of everything are incomplete and have a total of only 3,000 infantry. The Greeks attacked with 42,000 infantry, outnumbering the Bulgarians.

The battle flared up with terrible preparation on 18 June 1913, with reserves and support from the rear not arriving. On 22 June Colonel Kavarnaliev sent his adjutant, Lieutenant Durov, to the rear with the words: "Lieutenant, go on the road to Sofia and if you meet even one Bulgarian soldier, send him to me to throw him into battle!" Durov met many Bulgarian soldiers but they also fought desperately at Zletovo, Shtip, Zanoga, Kresna, Predela, Pehchevo, Berovo, Krivolak, Kalimantsi. And on 23 June Colonel Kavarnaliev threw into battle with the only reserve being his own regiment. He left the command bunker and with a rifle in his hand counterattacked with his soldiers in the front line. The opponent was repulsed, the position held. During the battle, Colonel Kavarnaliev was wounded in the leg. The wound looked light and he didn't leave the battlefield, but it turns out that the bullet pierced an important artery.

The brave general died a few hours later from blood loss on 23 June 1913. He was posthumously promoted to major general.

== Monument ==
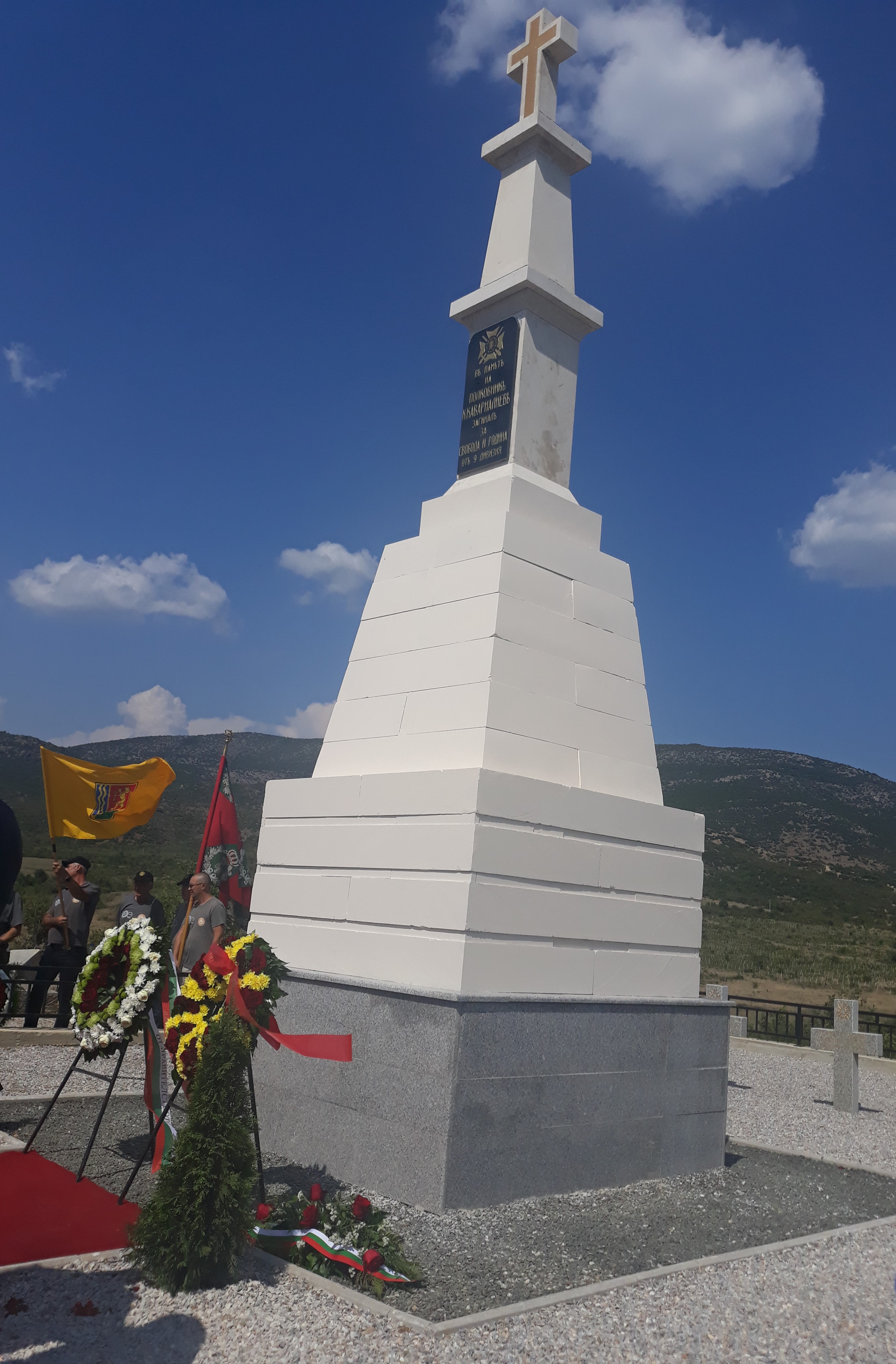
The restored monument to Gen. Kavarnaliev near Doiran

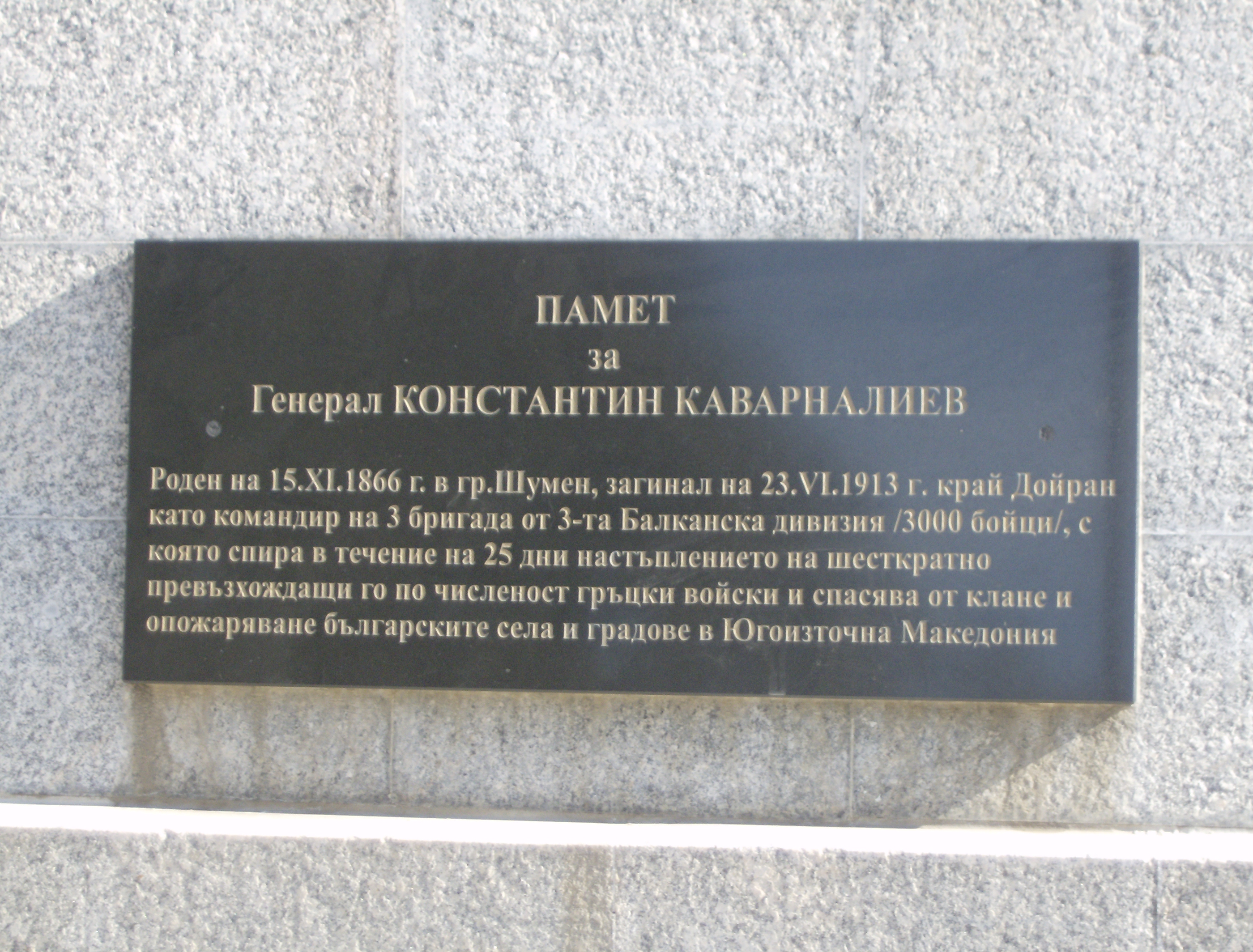
The Plaque of the Monument

During the First World War in 1916, when the region was ruled by the Kingdom of Bulgaria, a seven-meter monument was erected in honor of Konstantin Kavarnaliev at the place where he was previously buried.

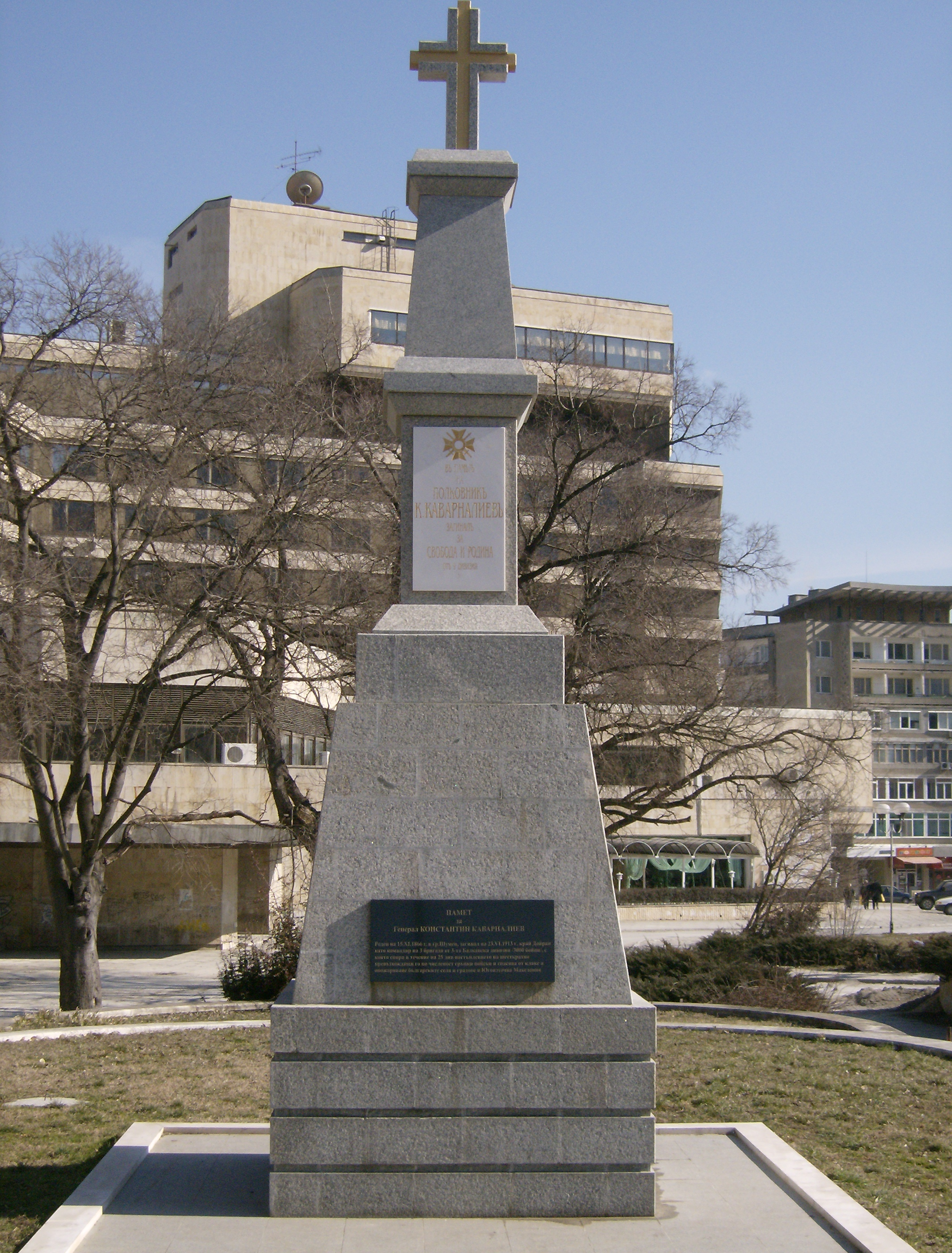
A copy of the old monument from Doiran, erected in 2009 in Shumen

The monument is on a small hill, next to the road to Valandovo, 3–4 km from Doiran. In form it resembles the monuments of Vasil Levski in Sofia and of the Tsar Liberator. It bears the inscription "Colonel Kavarnaliev, who died for freedom and homeland, from the 9th Pleven Division". The monument was unveiled by Colonel Boris Drangov . The writer Anton Strashimirov also delivered a speech. A memorial service was held by the regimental priests in the presence of troops from the Ninth Pleven Infantry Division. Five soldiers who died in the fighting in 1916 are also buried on the site at that time. Thus, Bulgarian military cemeteries were formed around this monument. The monument was blown up in 1966 during an operation to destroy Bulgarian military monuments in Yugoslavia.

In 2000, the tomb was desecrated by looters. Subsequently, at the initiative of the Pliska Association, the monument was restored, but no permission was obtained from the Macedonian authorities to erect it. Therefore, the monument was installed in the hometown of the deceased in Shumen.

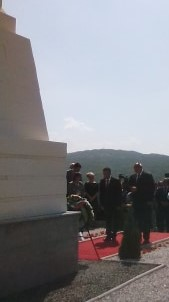
The Prime Ministers of Northern Macedonia and Bulgaria; Zaev and Borisov reopened the monument near Doiran on 1 August 2019

The monument near Doiran was restored, however, and was reopened in its original place on 1 August 2019 by the Bulgarian Prime Minister Boyko Borissov and the Prime Minister of North Macedonia Zoran Zaev.

== Bibliography ==
- The compound 1885 - encyclopedic reference book. Sofia: State Publishing House "Dr. Peter Beron". 1985.
- At Tito the monument to the hero is blown up, Standart newspaper, 3 December 2006.
- Bozhidar Dimitrov - Col. Kavarnaliev beats the Greeks himself, Standard newspaper, 3 December 2006.
- President Parvanov unveiled a monument to General Kavarnaliev in Shumen, SHUM.BG, 27.11.2009, 12:48
