= Battle of Kalimanci =

Part of the Second Balkan War (1913)

- Part of the Second Balkan War
- Bulgarian troops at the Battle of Kalimanci
Date	17–24 July 1913 (N.S.) (4–11 July in O.S.)
Location	Kalimanci (present-day North Macedonia) 41°58′24.21″N 22°36′52.52″E
Result	Bulgarian victory

Belligerents
Kingdom of Bulgaria	Kingdom of Serbia; Kingdom of Montenegro

Commanders and leaders
Mihail Savov; Vicho Dikov; Stefan Toshev	Božidar Janković; Crown Prince Alexander; Janko Vukotić

Strength
(Tsardom of Bulgaria (1908–1946)) 4th Bulgarian Army - 60,000 men (Tsardom of Bulgaria (1908–1946)) 5th Bulgarian Army	(Kingdom of Serbia) 1st Serbian Army (Kingdom of Serbia) 3rd Serbian Army (Kingdom of Montenegro) Montenegrin Division

Casualties and losses
2,400 killed 4,620 wounded	Serbia: 2,500 killed 4,850 wounded Montenegro: 107 killed 570 wounded

The Battle of Kalimanci (Bulgarian: Битка при Калиманци, Serbian: Битка код Калиманаца) was a series of engagements fought between 17–24 July 1913 during the Second Balkan War, between the Bulgarian 4th and 5th armies and the Serbian 1st and 3rd armies, supported by a Montenegrin division. The fighting extended across several locations around Kalimanci, while the Serbian First Army engaged the Bulgarian Fifth Army farther north near Kriva Palanka. Despite repeated Serbian–Montenegrin attacks, the Bulgarians held their positions and launched counterattacks along their northern flank. The battle ended in a Bulgarian victory, halting the Serbian offensive and preventing Serbian forces from linking up with the advancing Greek Army in the Struma valley.

== Prelude ==
The Serbian First Army pushed Bulgarian forces back beyond the Zletovska River and advanced between Kočani and Štip. Fighting continued through 2–5 July, after which the Bulgarians began retreating toward Strumica. At the Battle of Bregalnica, fought 30 June – 8 July 1913, the Bulgarian 4th Army was soundly defeated by the Serbs. Further Bulgarian defeats at the hands of the Greek army farther south at Kilkis–Lachanas and Doiran further threatened the Fourth Army's now uncertain left flank, while successes of the 1st, 3rd and 5th Bulgarian Armies northwards were not decisive. The strategic situation of Bulgaria went from bad to worse when 80,000 soldiers of the Romanian 5th Corps under General Ioan Culcer crossed the border into Southern Dobruja and occupied it, while the 250,000-strong Romanian Danube Army under the command of Crown Prince Ferdinand crossed the Danube into Bulgaria.

On 12 July, General Savov assumed command of the united 4th and 5th Armies and ordered them to continue holding their positions stubbornly, while preparing for a possible withdrawal to new defensive positions around Konyovo. Bulgarian ammunition supplies were becoming severely depleted, averaging about 300 shells per gun. Savov also increased reconnaissance activity to gain a better understanding of Serbian intentions. The overall operational situation was very bad, with the continuing retreat of the 2nd Army, which threatened the rear of the 4th Army, which was weakened after the Battle of Bregalnica, while the 5th Army lacked the strength for a major offensive and the 3rd Army covered Sofia and the right flank of the Bulgarian armies in Macedonia. Nevertheless, there was also good news for the armies under General Savov. Incoming reinforcements from the 1st Army under General Kutinchev, which were transferred to help stabilise the deteriorating situation in Macedonia, as well as Serbian formations being sent northwards to contain possible Bulgarian offensive actions around the Vlasina–Surdulica–Vranje sector, relieved pressure from the Bulgarian armies in Macedonia. The opportunity for decisive Bulgarian offensive action on the Macedonian front against Serbian forces, however, had, for the most part, been lost. Savov suspected Serbian forces were preparing a wide maneuver from the direction of Tsarevo Selo–Kočani–Kratovo against the Bulgarian 4th and 2nd Armies and ordered the restoration of the combat effectiveness of the 4th Army. General Vicho Dikov considered the 4th Army ready for stubborn defense but remained uncertain about possible offensive actions. The Serbian and Greek headquarters, seeking the unconditional surrender of the Bulgarians, agreed to begin a general offensive from Kalimanci to Nevrokop, with the two allied armies linking up around Tsarevo Selo and Pehchevo in order to encircle the Bulgarian 4th Army.

== Battle ==
On July 17, Serbian troops advanced from Kočani against the 7th Rila Division and the 3rd Thracian Brigade, and forward Bulgarian units withdrew to higher positions after initial skirmishing. The Serbs continued to advance along the Bregalnitsa valley against the Rila Division and the Macedonian-Adrianopolitan volunteers. General Savov correctly assumed that the intention of the Serbian army was to pin his attention on the right flank of the 4th Army while the Greek army attacked its left flank and the Serbs pressured the 5th Army north of the 4th. The Second Army had to support the left flank of the 4th so it would not be encircled by the Greeks. 18 July was one of the bloodiest days in the battle, centered around Banjo Chuka, which dominated the road to Tsarevo Selo. It began with Bulgarian units conducting night attacks against the Serbs, who in turn counterattacked. The Serbian high command sought to break through the left wing of the Kalimanci position and, under the cover of darkness, sent in the Montenegrin Division, which attacked the Bulgarian positions four times and, after a Bulgarian bayonet charge, transformed into merciless hand-to-hand combat. By the evening, the 4th Army repelled all Serbian-Montenegrin assaults, with the right bank of the Bregalnitsa and the village of Kalimanci remaining in Bulgarian hands. General Savov, encouraged by this defensive success, ordered the 5th Army to advance toward Sultan Tepe and throw the enemy towards Kumanovo, while promising assistance from the Tundzha Division. The 5th Army advanced on the morning of 18 July and drove away the Serbian forces, restoring positions the Bulgarians previously lost; however, because of the heavy rain, further operations were stopped.

On 19 July, the Serbs and Montenegrins began another set of attacks against the crucial Bulgarian positions at Banjo Chuka. Bulgarian troops counterattacked and seized several important heights, but the advance of the 4th Army's right wing was hampered by the Greek advance further south against its left wing. The Bdin Division was moved to defend against the Greeks and hold the right bank of the Bregalnitsa south. General Savov ordered the united 4th and 5th Armies under his command into defensive postures until reinforcements were received and the left flank of the 4th Army was secured, after which plans for a counteroffensive against Serbian forces in Macedonia were conceived. Greek forces pressured the Bulgarians hard in the direction of Berovo and Pehchevo in order to ease Serbian operations further north. On 20 July, the Greek army took Biaz Tepe, exposing the rear of the whole 4th Army. Thus arose the dangerous possibility of a breakthrough down the Bregalnitsa valley and toward Chavka and Tsarevo Selo, where all roads, warehouses, and hospitals gathered. General Savov ordered that the left wing had to hold to the end; otherwise, the situation would become critical. General Savov, however, remained composed and still believed the situation could be salvaged with the 4th Army holding a defensive posture, while the 5th Army energetically attacked the Serbs and a possible encirclement of the Greeks in the Kresna Gorge. The 5th Army, however, apart from limited local successes, was not strong enough to carry out General Savov's order to further develop the previous successes against the Serbs. During the night, Serbian forces attempted to capture Bulgarian positions around Golyak Mountain but were repulsed. The commander of the United Armies expected another general offensive by the Serbs along the road toward Tsarevo Selo and the Greeks down the Bregalnitsa valley, and ordered the 4th Army to hold the Chavka–Leshka–Ruen defensive line at all costs.

On 22 July, the armies of Serbia and Greece were striving to envelop the flanks of the 2nd, 4th, and 5th Armies and encircle all three Bulgarian armies. Taking advantage of the Greek offensive, the Serbian Main Command transferred four divisions against the 5th Army. The plan was, however, uncovered by General Savov. The Serbian troops attacked the Tundzha Division at Povien and the Macedonian-Adrianopolitan volunteers on the Tserski Heights, but were thrown back in disorder. The 4th Army defended successfully against the Serbs, but the Bdin Division withdrew from Ruen, exposing its left flank to the Greeks. General Savov ordered the recovery of Ruen and the holding of the positions until reinforcements arrived, after which he intended to attack the Greeks with the left wing of the 4th Army and inflict upon them a decisive defeat. On 23 July, Serbian troops launched an attack directed along the road to Tsarevo Selo against the Rila Division. The Serbian Main Command was trying to pin down as many Bulgarian forces as possible on the right bank of the Bregalnitsa so that they could support Greek operations south. The 8th Primorski Regiment awaited the Serbian attack and counterattacked, pushing them back and occupying some positions. The rear of the 4th Army remained uncertain, however, with Ruen remaining in Greek hands despite Bulgarian attempts to retake it. By 24 July, Serbian and Montenegrin troops were still repeatedly attacking the 4th Army at the Kalimanci position, but until the end of the war were unable to overcome the Bulgarian defenses. The Bulgarians remained on the Kalimanci position until the conclusion of the armistice.

== Aftermath ==
The Bulgarians won an important defensive victory at Kalimanci, which, combined with the general defensive successes of the Bulgarian 1st and 3rd Armies to the north, protected western Bulgaria and Sofia from a Serbian invasion. Although this was heartening for the Bulgarians, the situation on the Greek front was still critical. General Savov had no other option but to reinforce the 4th Army with units of the 5th. After repelling the attacks of three Serbian divisions and preventing their attempts to envelop the flanks, General Toshev detached one brigade and six battalions to assist the 4th Army.

== Sources ==
- Markov, Georgi (2017). Balgarskoto krushenie 1913 [The Bulgarian Catastrophe 1913] (in Bulgarian). Sofia: Zahariy Stoyanov. ISBN 978-954-09-1166-3.
- Ivetic, Egidio (2012). Balkanskite voyni [The Balkan Wars] (in Bulgarian). Sofia: Ciela Norma AD. ISBN 978-954-28-1202-9.
- Hall, R. (2000). The Balkan Wars 1912-1913. Prelude to the First World War. London: Routledge. ISBN 0-415-22946-4.
- Black, Jeremy (2016). Maps of War: Mapping Conflict Through the Centuries. Bloomsbury Publishing. ISBN 978-1-84486-463-8.
- Tucker, Spencer C. (2019). World War I: A Country-by-Country Guide [2 volumes]. Bloomsbury Publishing. ISBN 978-1-44086-369-1.
