= Hristo Pakov =

Bulgarian Division Commander

Христо Паков Hristo Pakov
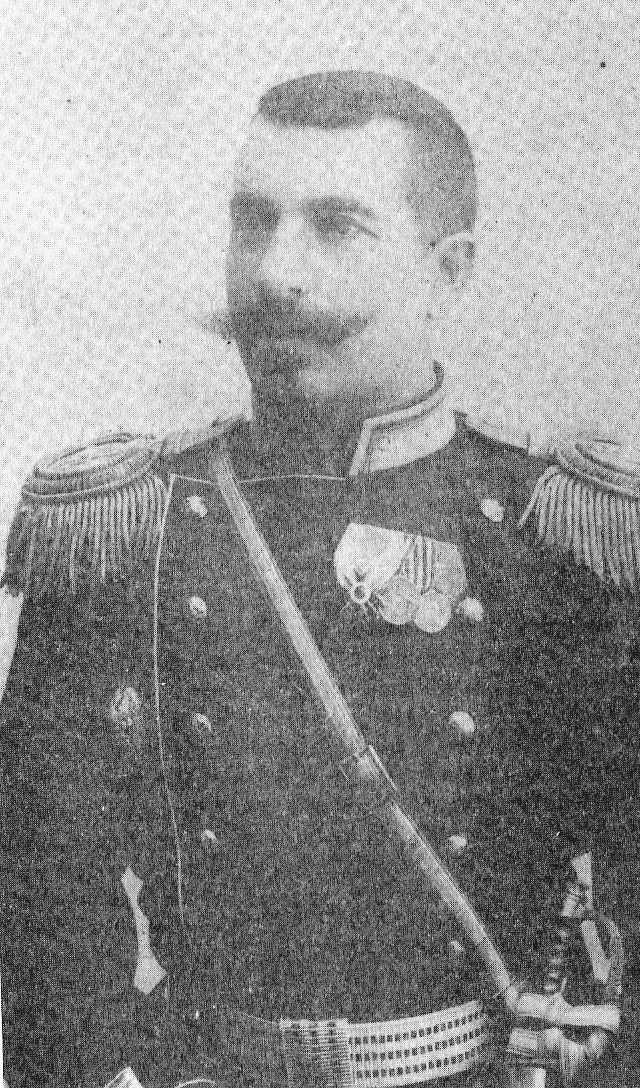
- Born: 15 August 1859; Pleven, Danube Vilayet, Ottoman Empire
- Died: 8 February 1941 (aged 81); Sofia, Sofia City Province, Bulgaria
- Military career
- Allegiance: Principality of Bulgaria; Russian Empire; Kingdom of Bulgaria
- Branch: Bulgarian Land Forces
- Service years: 1879 – 1936
- Conflicts: Serbo-Bulgarian War; First Balkan War; Bulgarian front; Second Balkan War; Battle of Doiran; World War I
- Awards: Order of Bravery (IV and III Degrees)

Hristo Kostakiev Pakov (Hristofor Konstantinov Pakov) was a Bulgarian major general and a commander of a division during the First World War.

== Biography ==
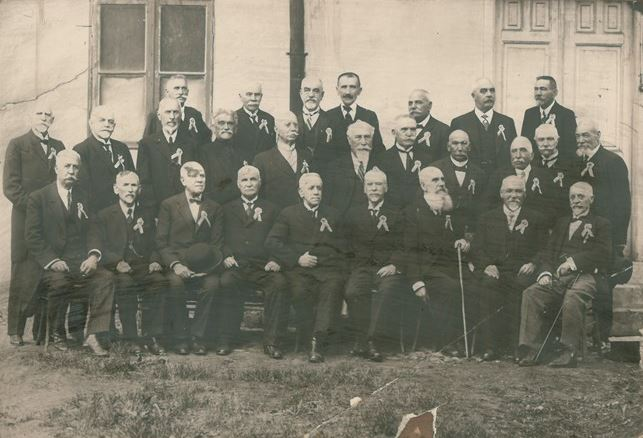
Photo of officers from the First Alumni of the Vasil Levski National Military University, photographed at a meeting on the occasion of 50 years of their production as officers. The first row from left to right: first Georgi Abadjiev, second Enyo Denchev, seventh Iliya Dimitrov, ninth Hristo Petrunov. Second row: Todor Stoev, Panteley Tsenov, fifth Vasil Kutinchev, seventh Stilian Kovachev, eighth Dobri Boyadzhiev, tenth Nikola Ivanov. Third row: first Hristo Pakov, third Nikifor Nikiforov, fourth Boncho Balabanov, sixth Kancho Kanchev

.

Hristo Pakov was born on 15 August 1859 in Pleven. On 10 May 1879 he graduated from the first class of the military school in Sofia and was promoted to the rank of lieutenant. On 30 August 1882 he was promoted to the rank of lieutenant. In the spring of 1885, a conflict arose between the Russian and Bulgarian officers in connection with the production of the latter in a higher rank and their appointment as commanders to other higher positions. Regarding the problem, Pakov took the sharpest position and after the investigation of the scandal caused by him on 11 August 1885, he resigned and went into the reserves. On 11 September he was enlisted in the Sixth Tarnovo Infantry Regiment and was promoted to the rank of captain. On 15 September 1885 he was appointed commander of the 4th Company of the 6th Tarnovo Infantry Regiment.

=== Serbo-Bulgarian War ===
During the Serbo-Bulgarian War, he and his company took part in the capture of the Dragoman Pass on 10 November and the height of Ostra Chuka. He led the night attack carried out on 10–11 November near the village of Dragoil, and his company managed to capture 80 officers and soldiers. For his participation in the war he was awarded the Order of Barvery, IV degree.

He took part in the coup on 9 August 1886 and was later dismissed from the army. He emigrated first to Romania and then to Russia and served in the Imperial Russian Army. In 1890 he graduated from the Alexander Law Military Academy in Russia . He returned in 1898 and commanded the 9th Plovdiv Infantry Regiment and the Nineteenth Shumen Infantry Regiment.

=== Balkan Wars, World War I and Later Life ===
In 1904 he was a colonel in command of the 19th Shumenski Infantry Regiment as part of the 1st Infantry Brigade (Shumen). During the First Balkan War he was commander of the 2nd Brigade of the 6th Infantry Division. Later in the Second Balkan War, he participated in the Battle of Doiran but was defeated. He would remain in service during World War I as a colonel. He was promoted to major general in 1936 but he shortly retired the same year and he died in Sofia in 1941.

== Bibliography ==
- Pakov H., The Actions of the 6th Infantry. Tarnovo Regiment during the Serbo-Bulgarian War in 1885, Military Journal, Vol. 3, 1908
- Compound 1885 - encyclopedic reference book. Sofia, State Publishing House "Dr. Peter Beron", 1985.
- Forums Fighting Glory - Pakov, Hristo Kostakiev
