= Kalimantsi =

Kalimantsi (also written Kalimantzi, Kalimanci; or Калиманци in Cyrillic) may refer to:

- In Bulgaria:
  - Kalimantsi, Blagoevgrad Province - a village in Sandanski municipality, Blagoevgrad Province
  - Kalimantsi, Varna Province, a village in Suvorovo municipality, Varna Province
- In the Republic of Macedonia:
  - Kalimanci, Vinica, a village in Vinica Municipality
