= Atanas Uzunov (major) =

Atanas Marinov Uzunov
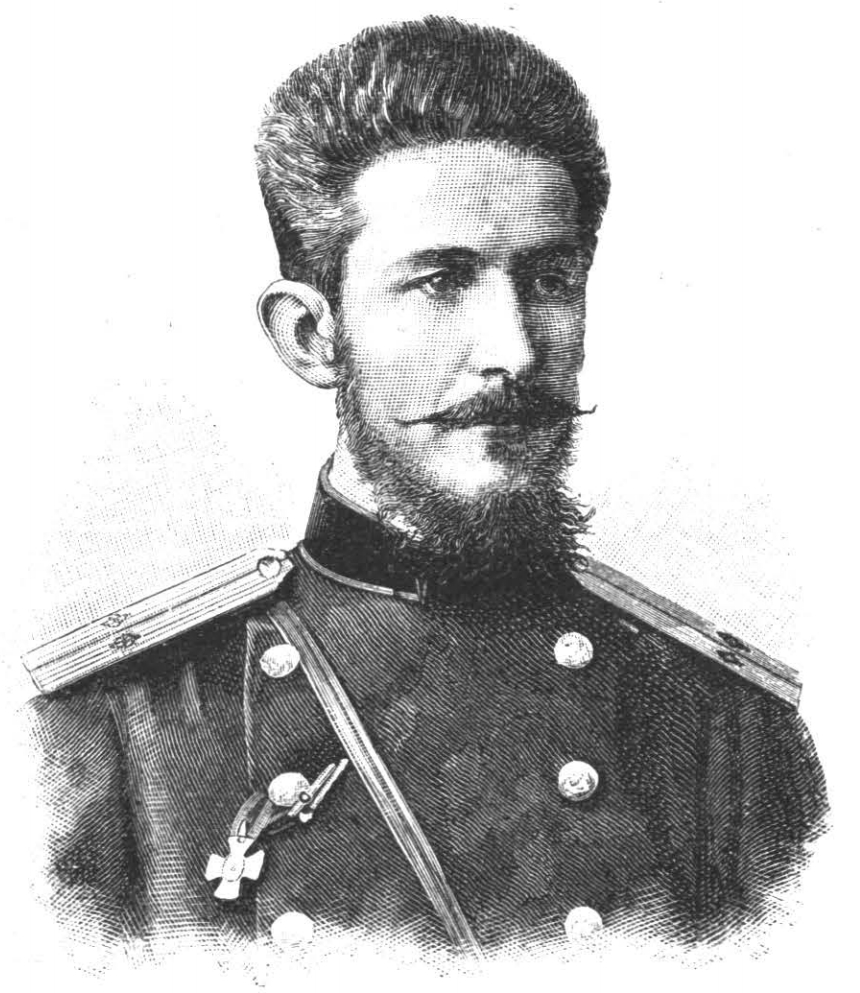
- Born: 1857; Ruse, Bulgaria, Ozu Eyalet, Ottoman Empire
- Died: February 22, 1887 (aged 30); Ruse, Bulgaria
- Military career
- Allegiance: Principality of Serbia; Principality of Bulgaria
- Branch: Armed forces of the Principality of Serbia; Bulgarian Volunteer Corps; Bulgarian Land Forces
- Service years: 1875 – 1887
- Rank: Major
- Conflicts: Stara Zagora Uprising; Serbian-Turkish Wars; Russo-Turkish War; Serbo-Bulgarian War; Siege of Vidin; Ruse Revolt †

Atanas Marinov Uzunov (1857–1887) was a Bulgarian revolutionary and officer, he was a participant in the struggle for liberation from Ottoman rule from 1875 to 1878, a defender of Vidin during the Serbo-Bulgarian War of 1885 and a leader of the Ruse Revolt in 1887.

== Biography ==
He was born in 1857 in Ruse. During the Stara Zagora Uprising in 1875, Uzunov participated in the Chervenovod detachment. After the failure of the uprising, he emigrated to Romania. He volunteered for the Serbo-Turkish War in 1876, fighting near the town of Zajecar and Korito. After the war in the same year he enlisted in the 60th Overseas Infantry Regiment of the Imperial Russian Army. He later graduated from the Junker Infantry School in Odessa in 1877.

At the declaration of the Russo-Turkish War and he enlisted in the Bulgarian Volunteer Corps and served in the III company of the II militia company. He took part in the Battle of Stara Zagora, he also fought on Shipka, in the Battle of Sheynovo and in the Kotel Balkans. He was awarded the Order of St. George IV degree and was promoted to the rank of ensign in 1878.

After the Liberation he served in the East Rumelia militia. He joined the II Kyustendil Infantry Company, and then the XXII Pazardzhik Infantry Company and the I Sofia Sapper Company. He was the first officer in the Bulgarian Army to graduate from the Military Engineering Academy in St. Petersburg.

During the Serbo-Bulgarian War in 1885 he was chief of the Northern Detachment and commandant of the Baba Vida. He proved to be an erudite military engineer in the fortification and defense of the fortress. Called by Serbian General Milojko Lešjanin to surrender the fortress, Uzunov replied that he had learned how to capture fortresses, not how to surrender and continue the defense. He repulsed all attacks by the Timok army until the armistice of November 16, 1885.

As head of the 3rd brigade and commander of Ruse in February 1887 Atanas Uzunov started a failed mutiny against the Regency. He was sentenced to death for the riot and shot on February 22 on the Leventtabia plateau, not far from the city.

He was declared an honorary citizen of Vidin in 1886. The village of Major Uzunovo, many streets in Bulgaria and the Sports School in Ruse are named after him.

== Bibliography ==
- Simeon Radev: The builders / creators of modern Bulgaria. Volume 2 (1911) and Volume 3 (2008) (Bulgar. "Строителите на съвременна България". Том 2, Том 3)
- Виктор Иванович Косик: Время разрыва политика России в болгарском вопросе 1886–1894 гг.
- R. J. Crampton: Bulgaria.
- R.J. Crampton: A concise history of Bulgaria.
- Duncan M. Perry: Stefan Stambolov and the Emergence of Modern Bulgaria, 1870–1895.
- Duncan M. Perry: The politics of terror: the Macedonian liberation movements, 1893–1903. Duke University Press, 1988, ISBN 0-8223-0813-4,
