= Battle of Pirot =

Decisive battle in the Serbo-Bulgarian War

- Part of Serbo-Bulgarian War
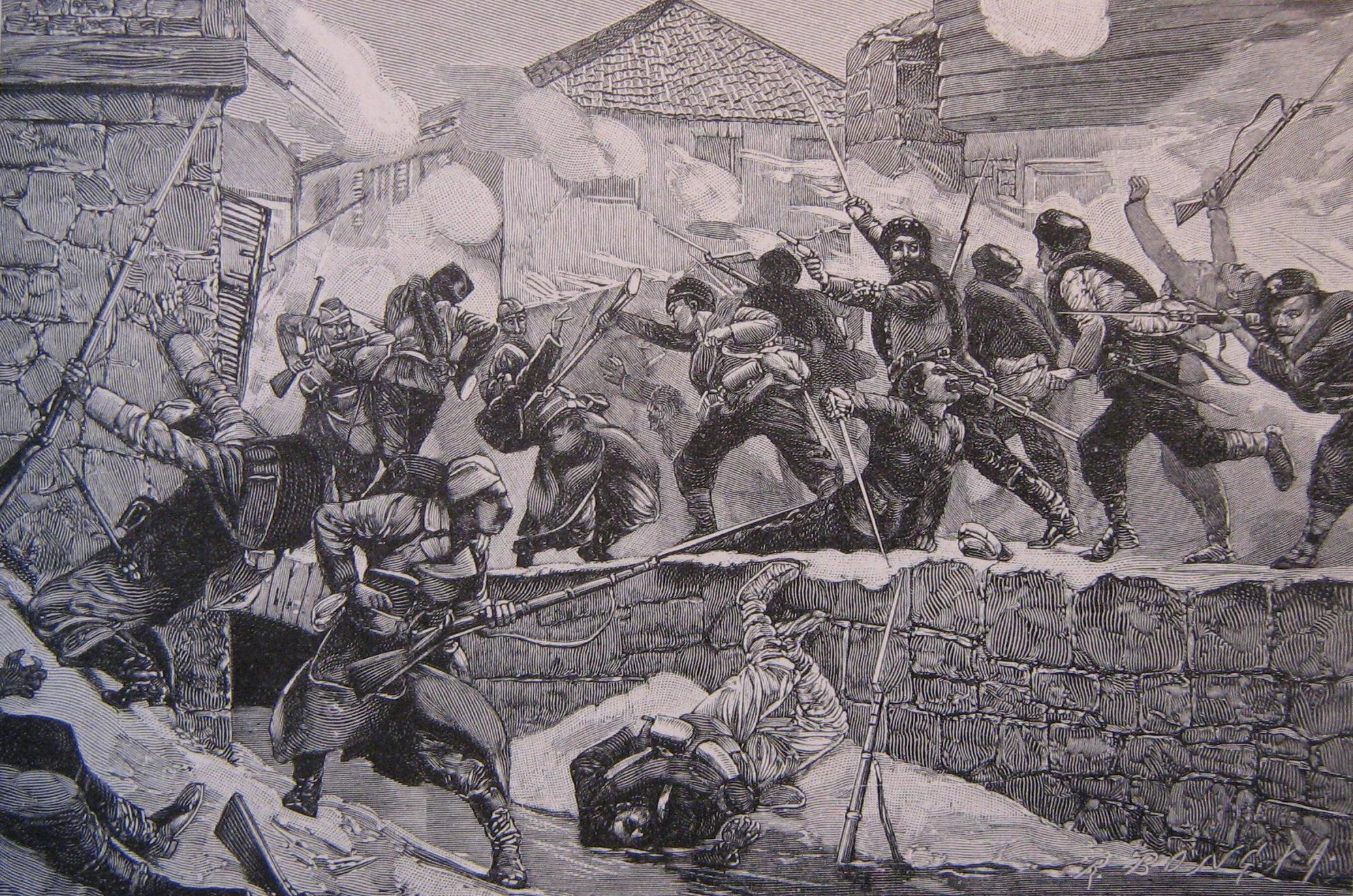
- Street fighting in Pirot
Date	26–27 November 1885^{[a]}
Location	Pirot, Kingdom of Serbia
Result	Bulgarian victory

Belligerents
Bulgaria	Serbia

Commanders and leaders
Alexander I Danail Nikolaev	Milan I Petar Topalović

Units involved
Western Army	Nišava Army

Strength
45,000; 80 guns	40,000; 84 guns

Casualties and losses
2,500 killed or wounded	2,000 killed or wounded

The Battle of Pirot (Bulgarian: Битка при Пирот Serbian: Битка код Пирота) took place between 26 and 27 November 1885,^{[a]} during the Serbo-Bulgarian War, near the town of Pirot, Serbia. The battle opposed the Bulgaria Western Corps to the Serbian Nišava Army. It ended with a Bulgarian victory and the signing of an armistice. The battle led to the treaty of Bucharest ending the Serbo-Bulgarian War, restoring peace between the two countries.

== Prelude ==
After the Bulgarian victory at the Battle of Slivnitsa, fought from 17 to 19 November 1885, the Bulgarian Army counter-attacked. The Bulgarian troops defeated the Serbs at Gurgulyat (19 November) and Dragoman (22 November) and subsequently reached the city of Pirot, where the Serbian Nišava army occupied defensive positions on the hills west of the town.

== Battle ==
On 26 November, the Bulgarians defeated the Serbian cover forces along the border and moved on to Pirot. At around 15:00 on the same day, the Bulgarian advanced guard engaged the enemy and first achieved success on the left flank of the front, after the detachment of Captain Popov had seized the heights of Divan and Cherni Vrah. On the right flank, the 10th Regiment of the Serbian Šumadija Division retreated followed by the two battalions sent to defend Pirot. During the skirmishes on the left flank, the Bulgarians had suffered 48 killed, 136 wounded and 27 missing, and the Serbians lost 67 soldiers, had 134 wounded and 85 captured. The Serbians were badly equipped and unprepared and used second-hand obsolete Russian artillery, and the Bulgarians used modern German weaponry.

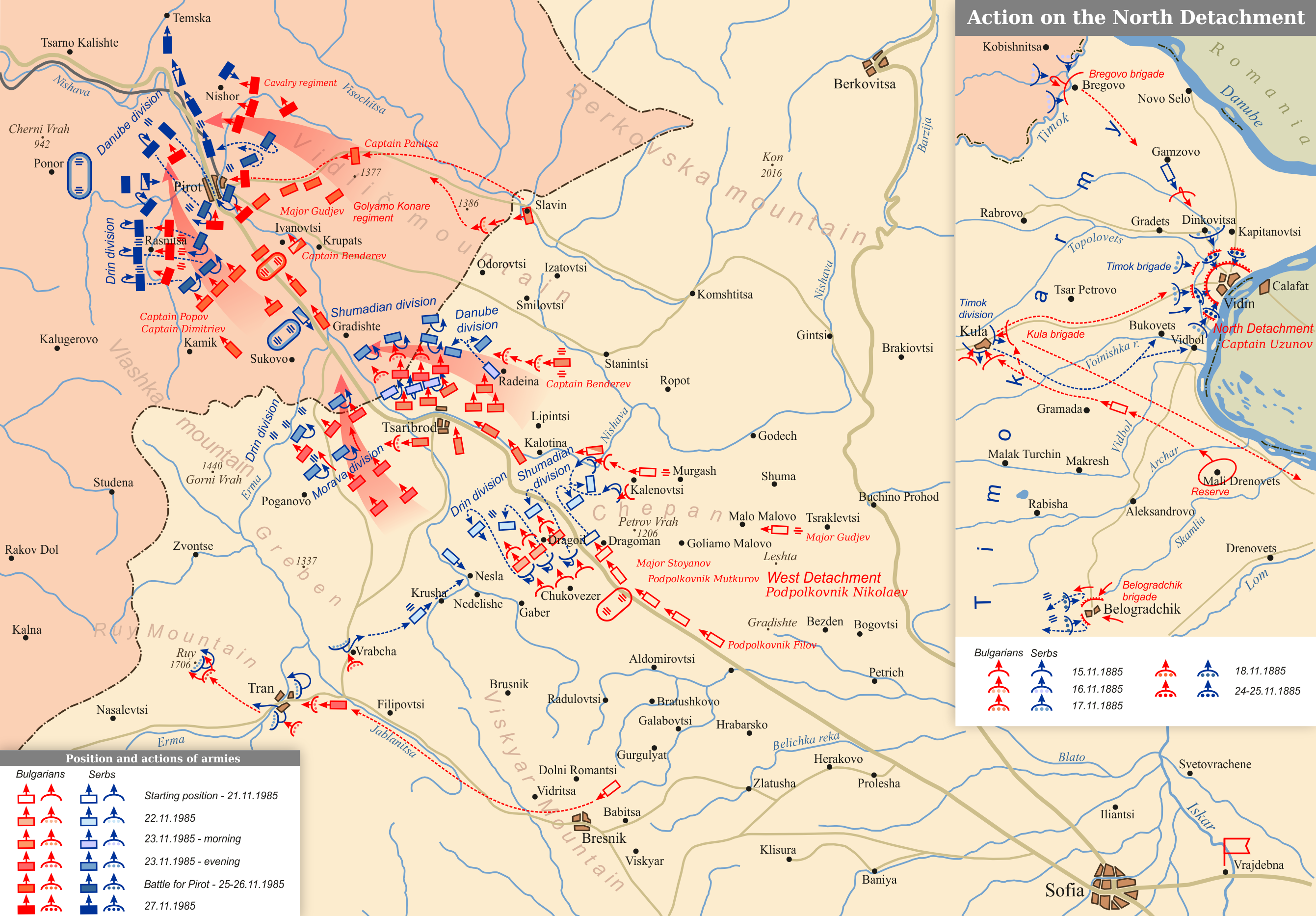
Counteroffensive of the Bulgarian Army (22-27.XI.1885)

During the night of 27 November, the Serbs regrouped and at dawn managed to retake Pirot from the Bulgarians. The column of Major Gudzhev attacked the Šumadija Division and the Bulgarians managed to push the Serbs to the river Temska. The retreat of the Šumadija Division forced the Drina Division to pull back as well and the Bulgarians pursued them. On the left flank, the Bulgarians were also successful. The Serbs managed to hold their position in the southern part of Pirot until the night. Later the Bulgarians pushed the Serbs from the city and attacked Serbian army positions west of the town of Pirot. The Serbians continued to hold a position to the south of the town till nightfall.

== Aftermath ==
A day after the victory, the Bulgarian Army prepared to continue its advance to the city of Niš, which was a target of the Greater Bulgarian national project, but the Austro-Hungarian delegation in the Bulgarian capital made it clear that if the Bulgarian advance continued, Austria-Hungary would intervene in the war on the side of Serbia. As a result, the same day, an armistice was concluded. The treaty of Bucharest on 3 March 1886 brought the brief war to an end and restored the prewar status quo.

== Notes ==
^{1} In the Julian calendar, the battle was on 14 and 15 November.

== Sources ==
- Atanasov, Sht. (1959). Balgarskoto voenno izkustvo prez kapitalizma [Bulgarian Military Art under Capitalism] (in Bulgarian). Sofia: Darzhavno voenno izdatelstvo pri MNO.
- Dimitrov, I. (1985). Saedinenieto 1885 - entsiklopedichen spravochnik [The Unification of 1885 - Encyclopedic Reference Book] (in Bulgarian). Sofia: Darzhavno izdatelstvo "Dr. Petar Beron".
- Nedevska, E.; Shanov, S. (1985). Srabsko-balgarskata voyna 1885. Sbornik spomeni [The Serbo-Bulgarian War of 1885: Collection of Memoirs] (in Bulgarian). Sofia: Voenno izdatelstvo.
- Venedikov, Y. (1985). Istoriya na dobrovoltsite ot Srabsko-balgarskata voyna 1885 godina [History of the Volunteers of the Serbo-Bulgarian War of 1885] (in Bulgarian). Sofia: Izdatelstvo na Otechestveniya front.
- Hristov, H. (1985). Srabsko-balgarskata voyna 1885. Sbornik dokumenti [The Serbo-Bulgarian War of 1885: Collection of Documents] (in Bulgarian). Sofia: Voenno izdatelstvo.
- Goldstein, E. (2005). Wars and Peace Treaties: 1816 to 1991. Taylor & Francis. ISBN 978-1-134-89912-8.
- Tucker, Spencer C. (2010). A Global Chronology of Conflict: From the Ancient World to the Modern Middle East. ABC-CLIO. ISBN 978-1-85109-667-1.
- Hall, Richard C. (2014). War in the Balkans: An Encyclopedic History from the Fall of the Ottoman Empire to the Breakup of Yugoslavia. Bloomsbury Publishing. ISBN 978-1-61069-031-7.
