= Battle of Doiran (1913) =

Part of the Second Balkan War

Coordinates: 41.18018°N 22.72332°E

- Part of Second Balkan War
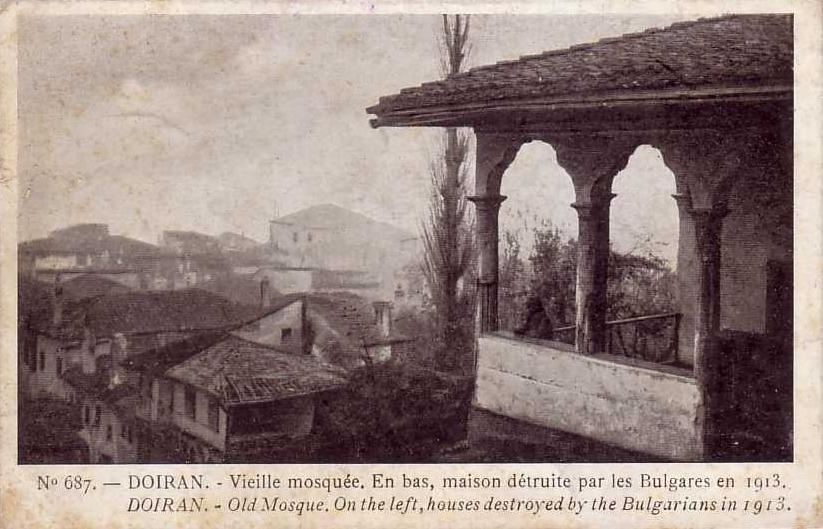
- Houses destroyed by the Bulgarians at Doiran c. 1913
Date	22–23 June 1913
Location	Lake Doiran, Tsardom of Bulgaria (now Greece and Republic of North Macedonia)
Result	Greek victory

Belligerents
Bulgaria	(Kingdom of Greece) Greece

Commanders and leaders
Pravoslav Tenev; Konstantin Kavarnaliev †; Hristo Pakov	Leonidas Paraskevopoulos (10th division); Konstantinos Damianos (Note: Commands and Headquarters of the Large Units (Formations) during the Balkan Wars, 1912–13.) (3rd division)

Units involved
2nd Army	3rd Division; 10th Division

Strength
2 infantry brigades	2 divisions

Casualties and losses
Half of forces killed, wounded, or captured (~2,000–4,000)	252 killed 755 wounded

The Battle of Doiran was a battle of the Second Balkan War, fought between the Bulgaria and Greece. The battle took place in June 1913.

The Hellenic Army, after the victory at Kilkis-Lachanas, continued their advance north and successfully engaged the Bulgarians at Lake Doiran. The Bulgarian army had retreated to the lake, after having destroyed the bridges of Strymon River and burned the town of Serres. As a result of their subsequent defeat, the Bulgarian forces retreated further north.

== Battle ==
The Doiran Lake was at the right wing of the Bulgarian line of defense. The 2nd Bulgarian Army was responsible for the defense of this sector. The Bulgarian artillery was for some time successful against the Greek attack. When the Evzones captured the train station of Doiran, fearing that they would be encircled, retreated further north. Following orders by King Constantine, the Greek army captured Gevgelija, Meleniko, Petrich and advanced in the Bulgarian territory aiming to capture Sofia.

Another part of the Greek army marched eastern to capture Drama and Western Thrace, while ships of the Greek navy with an amphibious operation were landed at Kavala.

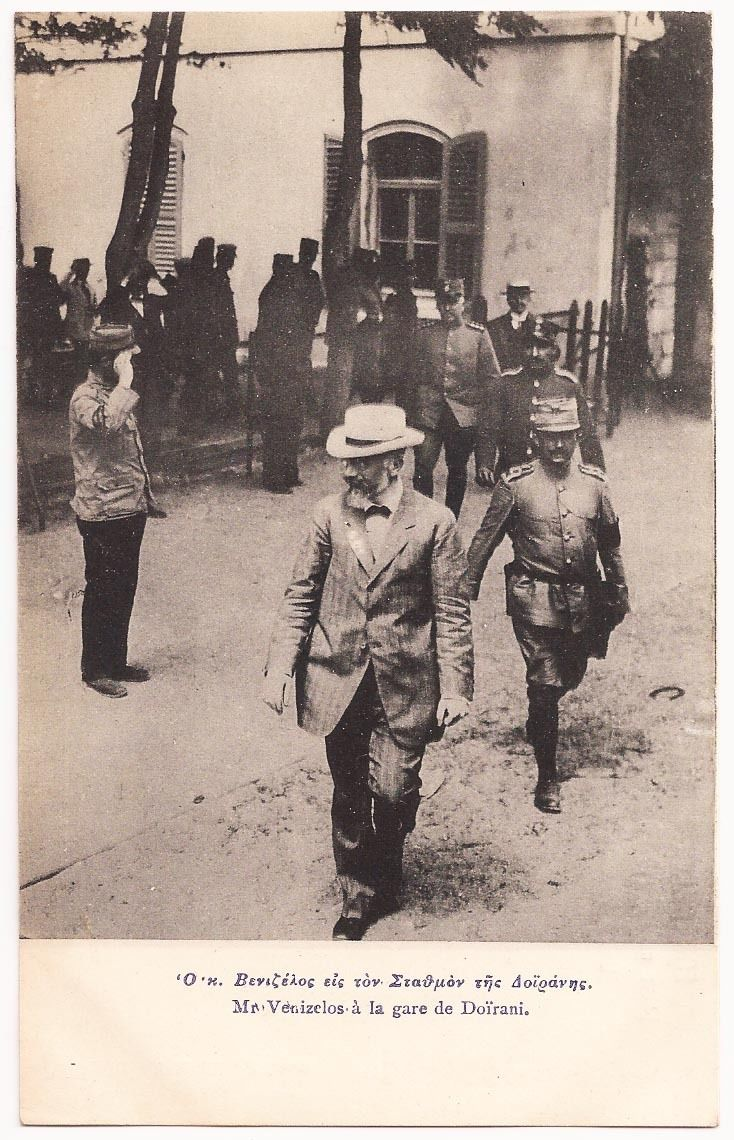
Greek Prime Minister Eleftherios Venizelos at Doiran station (1913).
