= Battle of Slivnitsa =

Part of the Serbo-Bulgarian War of 1885

- Part of the Serbo-Bulgarian War
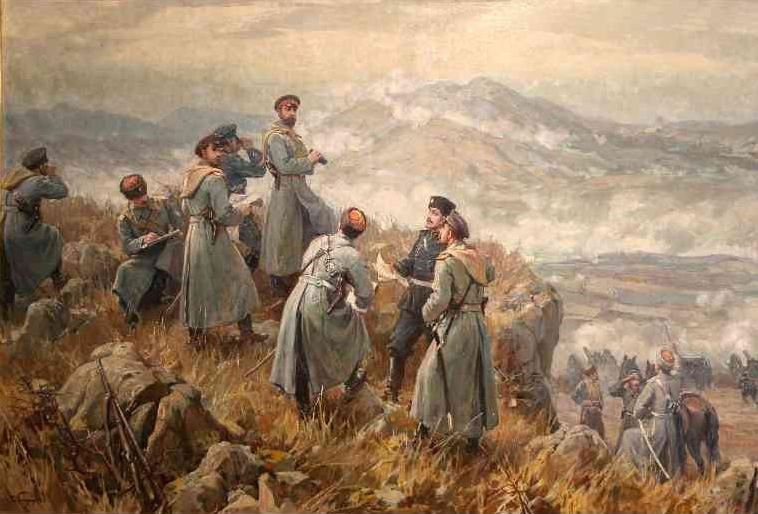
- Alexander of Battenberg on the battlefield of Dragoman
Date	17 November 1885 – 19 November 1885
Location	Slivnitsa, Bulgaria
Result	Bulgarian victory: Bulgarian invasion of Serbia begins; Serbia calls on Austria Hungary for allied assistance before final surrender

Belligerents
Bulgaria	Serbia

Commanders and leaders
Alexander I	Milan I

Strength
12,000 in the beginning; 32,000 by 17 November	25,000 in the beginning; 40,000 by 17 November

Casualties and losses
1,800	2,100

The Battle of Slivnitsa (Bulgarian: Битка при Сливница, Serbian: Битка на Сливници) was a battle between the Bulgarian Army and the Royal Serbian Army from 17 to 19 November 1885, in the Serbo-Bulgarian War. The Bulgarian victory solidified the unification between the Principality of Bulgaria and Eastern Rumelia.

== Background ==
The conclusion of the Russo-Turkish War (1877–1878) and the Congress of Berlin 1878 left Bulgaria divided into two sections. The area north of the Balkan Mountains and Sofia became an autonomous principality. Eastern Rumelia between the Balkan and Rhodope mountains gained semi-autonomous status with an Ottoman-appointed Christian governor.

The Bulgarian Assembly chose Prince Alexander Battenberg as its ruler and continued to press for the reunification of the country. Political changes in 1883 caused a cooling in relations between Bulgaria and its protector, Russia, which now opposed reunification.

In September 1885, a rebellion broke out in Eastern Rumelia. Alexander was placed in a difficult position. He risked Russian opposition if he supported the revolt and the loss of his throne unless he retained leadership of the Bulgarian national movement. He decided to keep his throne. In response, the Russians recalled all of their officers, which left the Bulgarian Army virtually leaderless above the rank of captain.

The Bulgarians concentrated their limited forces in Eastern Rumelia in expectation of an Ottoman attack that never materialised. The actual threat came from the west in the shape of King Milan's Serbia. Bulgarian unification upset the balance of power in the Balkans, and Milan demanded compensation.

== Armies ==
The Bulgarian field army in 1885 consisted of just under 30,000 men organised into 8 three-battalion infantry regiments (700 men each), 9 squadrons of cavalry and 12 eight-gun batteries. In addition, the first line of the Eastern Rumelia militia had been mobilised consisting of 12 infantry battalions, 2 squadrons of cavalry, and 4 guns. During the war the second ban of the Eastern Rumelia militia was mobilised (12 battalions) along with the Bulgarian second ban (8 battalions) and as many as 20 volunteer battalions, 3 Macedonian battalions, and some 6,000 Muslim volunteers. The army was short of senior officers.

Confident of an easy victory and to some extent recognising that the war was not popular in Serbia, Milan mobilised only the active (first ban) army. That gave a field army of 5 divisions consisting of 80 battalions (700 men each), 21 cavalry squadrons and 46 batteries: a total of 70,000 men and 264 guns. In fact, only 49 battalions and 23 batteries were ready for the invasion, the rest, along with elements of the second ban, became available only in the last stage of the war. A key weakness was the limited number of modern Krupp and du Bange guns.

== Opening moves ==
Serbia declared war on 13 November 1885 and crossed the lightly defended north-western border in three columns. The main army advanced in the centre (Šumadija, Danube and Drina divisions). To the south went the Morava division and to the north the Timok division. The plan was to break through the Bulgarian defences and concentrate four divisions before Sofia.

In response, Alexander had to move his army from Eastern Rumelia to Sofia by all means available including the one limited railway line. One infantry regiment marched 95 km in 32 hours. The light Bulgarian forces on the Serbian border succeeded in slowing the Serbian advance in the mountainous terrain, which favoured the defence. Gradually, reinforcements arrived at the previously prepared defensive position at Slivnitsa, 30 km north-west of Sofia.

== Battle ==
Alexander arrived on the evening of the 16th to find a well-prepared defensive position manned by 9 battalions, plus some 2,000 volunteers and 32 guns, commanded by Major Guchev. The position consisted of nearly 4 km of trenches and artillery redoubts either side of the main road on a ridge in front of the village of Slivnitsa. To the right was steep mountainous terrain, and the left wing had the easier Visker Hills towards Breznik.

The three Serbian centre divisions also arrived on the 16th and halted to recover after the fierce Bulgarian delaying action in the Dragoman Pass. The Morava division was at Tran, some distance from its objective, Bresnik, to the south. The northern advance was bogged down along the Danube.

The morning of the 17th came with rain and mist but not the expected Serbian attack. By 10 a.m. Alexander ordered three battalions to advance on the right. They surprised the Danube division, which eventually rallied and pushed them back. The main Serbian attack began on the centre largely unsupported by artillery, which had insufficient range. The weight of Bulgarian fire forced it back with some 1,200 casualties. A relief column led by Captain Benderev recaptured the heights on the right and forced the Danube division back to the road.

At daybreak on the 18th, the Serbians attacked the weaker left flank of the Bulgarian line. Just in time, two battalions of the Preslav Regiment arrived to shore up the position. Further attacks in the centre were repulsed with heavy Serbian casualties and Benderev captured two further positions in the mountains.

On the 19th, the Serbians concentrated two divisions for an attack on the Bulgarian left near Karnul (today Delyan, Sofia Province) in an attempt to join up with the Morava division. However, three battalions of Bulgarian troops led by Captain Popov from Sofia had held the Morava division in the Visker Hills and the flanking move failed. Alexander now ordered a counterattack, which pushed the Serbians back on both flanks although nightfall prevented a complete collapse.

== Bulgarians advance ==
Slivnitsa was the decisive battle of the war. The Serbians fought only limited rearguard actions as they retreated and by 24 November were back in Serbia. The Timok division in the north continued the siege of Vidin until 29 November.

Bulgaria's main army crossed the border in two strong divisions (Guchev and Nikolaev) supported by flanking columns and converged on Pirot. The Serbian Army dug in on the heights west of the town. On 27 November, the Bulgarian Army flanked the right of the Serbian position with Prince Alexander personally leading the final attack. The Serbians were defeated and fled to Niš.

On the 28th came political intervention from Austria and Russia, and a ceasefire was agreed. Serbian casualties totaled 6,800, compared to 2,300 Bulgarians. Serbian sources state that the casualties in th battle totalled 3,000 for the Serbs vs 2,500 for the Bulgarians, and 7,000 for the Serbs vs 5,000 for the Bulgarians in the whole war. The Treaty of Bucharest of 1886 effectively confirmed the unification of Bulgaria. Unfortunately for Prince Alexander, Russia continued to oppose his reign, and he was deposed by Russophile officers in August 1886.
