= Petar Topalović =

Serbian military officer (1840–1891)

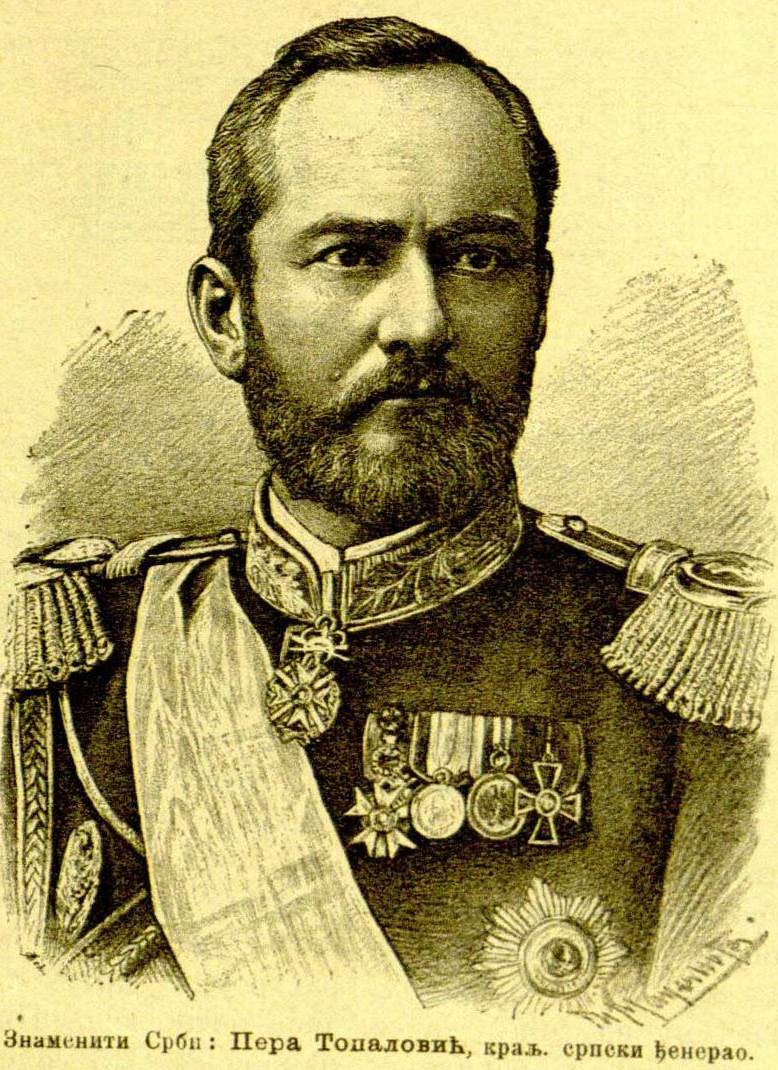
- Born: September 14, 1840; Kragujevac, Šumadija District, Principality of Serbia
- Died: August 20, 1891 (aged 50); Belgrade, Kingdom of Serbia
- Military career
- Allegiance: Principality of Serbia; Kingdom of Serbia
- Branch: Armed Forces of the Principality of Serbia; Royal Serbian Army
- Rank: Colonel
- Conflicts: Serbian–Turkish Wars (1876–1878); Serbo-Bulgarian War

Petar Topalović (September 14, 1840 – August 20, 1891) was a Serbian general, minister of defence, minister of construction of the Kingdom of Serbia and chief of the Military Academy.

== Biography ==
=== Early life and military career ===
Petar Topalović was born on September 14, 1840, in Kragujevac. He is the son of Milosav Topalović and Anka Nenadović (1820-1843), the grandson of Jevrem Nenadović and the great-grandson of Jakov Nenadović. He was married to Lenka, the daughter of George Pantelic, a merchant from Sremska Mitrovica. He had a son Milosav and daughters Draginja and Anka. Draginja's daughter was married to Lieutenant Ljubomir Pokorny.

He was taught elementary school privately. He finished 4 grades of high school in Belgrade, and after that, in 1855, he entered the Artillery School (Military Academy) in Belgrade. He was promoted to the rank of lieutenant in 1860. First, until December 1861, he was a sergeant in an infantry company. From 1861 to 1863 he was a state cadet in Prussia, in Potsdam and Berlin, in the Guards units. He left the army on his own initiative in January 1863, together with Sava Grujić and Dimitrije Đurić, because their request to return to Serbia after the Čukur Fountain incident was not granted. At his own expense he went to Paris. From 1864 to 1866 he was a cadet of the French General Staff Academy. During 1867, he spent seven months as a state cadet in the topography department in Paris.

He returned to the civil service in 1867, so from 1867 to 1868 he was a sergeant in the artillery, and then he served for several months in the general military department of the Ministry of Defense and was an aide to Mihailo Obrenović. After that, from 1868 to 1873, he was a staff officer of the Sabac district. He was promoted to the rank of General Staff Captain in 1873. From 1873 to 1875, he taught the history of war skills and strategy at the Military Academy as a professor. He was promoted to the rank of major in 1875. From 1874 to 1876, he was the chief of staff of the artillery brigade, and from 1876 until the beginning of the First Serbian-Turkish War, he was the chief of the general staff of the Timok divisional area.

=== Serbian Turkish Wars ===
In the First Serbian-Turkish War in 1876, he was the chief of staff of the Timok Army. From October 1876, he was in the headquarters of Mikhail Chernyayev, first the chief of staff of the 4th Corps, then the chief of staff of the Timok-Moravian army, and then the chief of staff of the Timok Corps. He was promoted to the rank of lieutenant colonel on October 22, 1876. At the beginning of the Second Serbian-Turkish War in December 1877, he was the commander of the Danube Division of the Timok Corps. He performed with the Danube Division from Gramada to Nis. His division was hired to block Nis from the northeast. During the liberation of Nis, his division fired heavy artillery fire at the Turkish fortifications at Vinik, with the aim of facilitating the attack of the Sumadija Corps. From January 15 to October 21, 1878, he was the commander of the Ibar Division.

=== Minister of construction and defense ===
Until April 1880 he served in the general staff and was a professor at the military academy. He was promoted in 1881 in the rank of colonel. From April 1880 until September 1885, he was the chief of the General Staff Department of the general staff. He participated in the Serbo-Bulgarian War in 1885 as commander of the Moravian Division. After the Serbian defeat at Slivnica, he replaced him on December 2, 1885, by Jovan Petrovic as chief of staff of the Supreme Command. He was promoted in March 1887 to the rank of general. From April 4, 1886, until February 17, 1887, he was the minister of construction in the government of Milutin Garašanin. After that, he was the minister of defense in the same government from February 17 to June 13, 1887. In November 1887, he was appointed commander of the Moravian divisional area. Since 1886 until 1890, was a professor at the military academy. He was the director of the military academy on two occasions, from March 13 to April 4, 1886, and again from April 8, 1889, until his death in 1891.

He published several articles in Ratnik and Vojin. He translated from German: A Soldier on the Land (1875) and from Sherf A few instructions for fighting (1876). He translated Vial's Strategy (1876) from French.

=== Awards and Later Life ===
He was awarded the following domestic decorations, the Order of the Cross of the 1st and 2nd order, the Gold Medal for Courage, the War Memorial for Liberation and Independence 1879-1878. Monument to the War of 1885-1886. and the Order of the Officer's Cross of the Legion of the Part (France and the Order of the Iron Crown of the 2nd Order) (Austria).

He died in Belgrade, on August 20, 1891.
