= Serbo-Bulgarian War =

1885 war between Serbia and Bulgaria

- Part of the Bulgarian Crisis
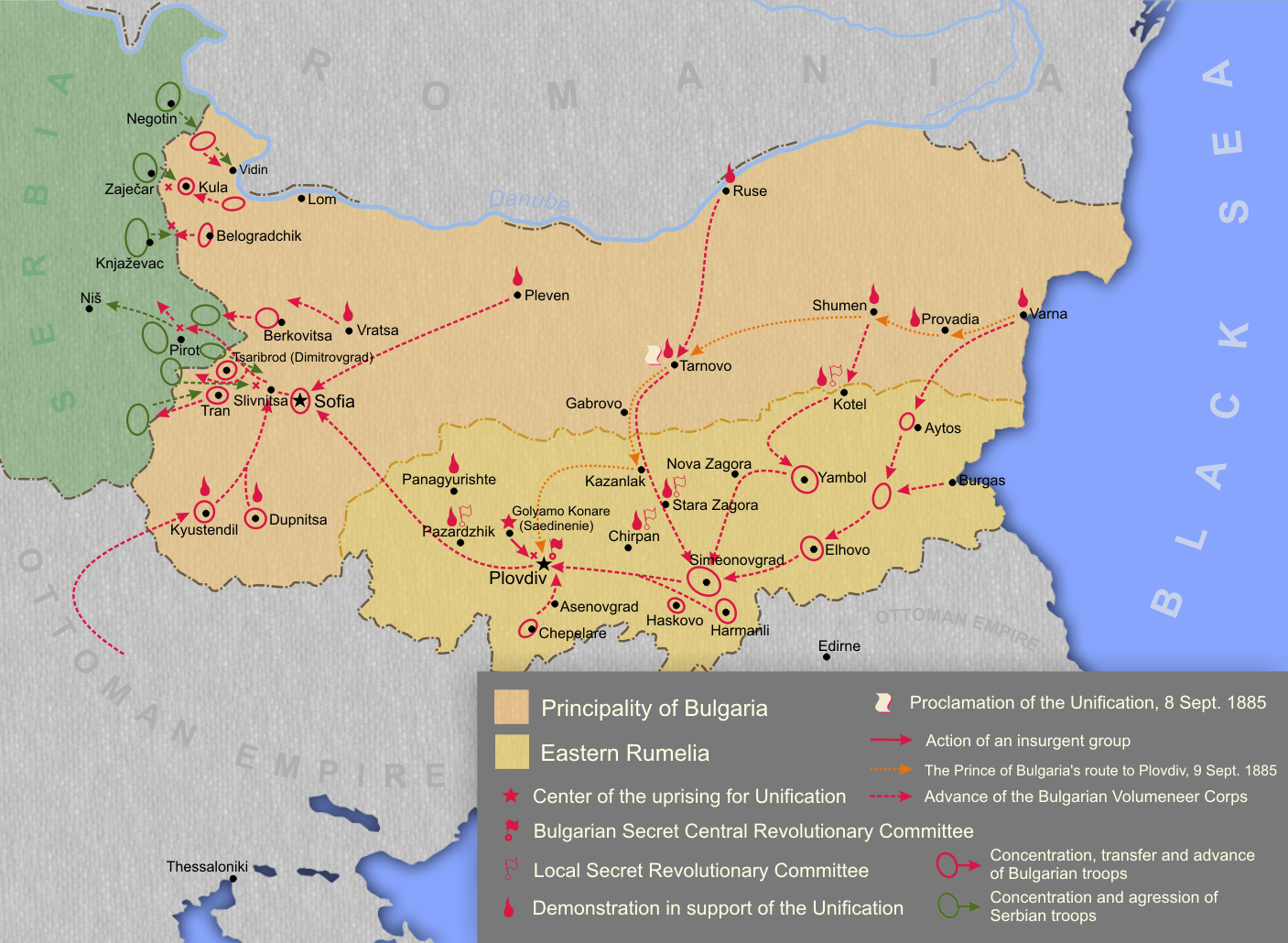
- Military operations during the Serbo-Bulgarian War
Date	14–28 November 1885 (N. S.)
Location	Eastern Serbia and western Bulgaria
Result	Bulgarian victory
Territorial changes	Unification of Bulgaria recognized after the defeat of Serbia; Bulgaria doubled in territory by annexing East Rumelia from the Ottoman Empire

Belligerents
Serbia; Support: Austria-Hungary	Bulgaria

Commanders and leaders
(Kingdom of Serbia) Milan I; (Kingdom of Serbia) Petar Topalović; (Kingdom of Serbia) Milojko Lešjanin	(Principality of Bulgaria) Alexander I; (Principality of Bulgaria) Atanas Uzunov; (Principality of Bulgaria) Danail Nikolaev

Strength
60,000 soldiers	50,000 soldiers

Casualties and losses
770 killed 4,570 wounded	550 killed 4,232 wounded

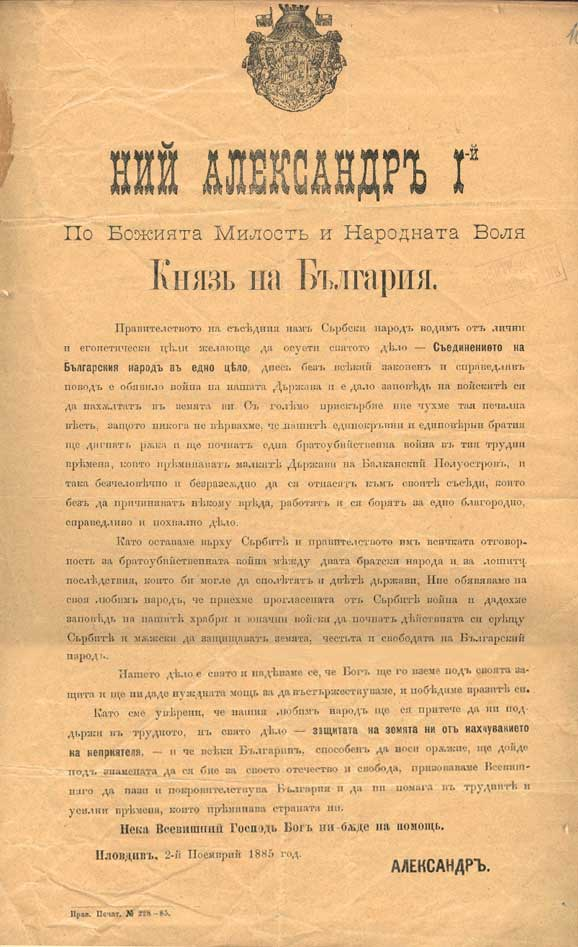
Manifesto of Knyaz Alexander of Bulgaria declaring the Serbo-Bulgarian War on 2 November 1885 (O. S.)

The Serbo-Bulgarian War or the Serbian–Bulgarian War (Bulgarian: Сръбско-българска война, Srăbsko-bălgarska voyna, Serbian: Српско-бугарски рат, Srpsko-bugarski rat), a war between the Kingdom of Serbia and the Principality of Bulgaria, erupted on 14 November [O.S. 2 November] 1885 and lasted until 28 November [O.S. 16 November] 1885. Despite Bulgaria's status as a vassal of the Ottoman Empire, the Ottomans did not intervene in the war. Serbia initiated the fighting but suffered a decisive defeat. Austria-Hungary demanded that Bulgaria stop its invasion, and a truce resulted.

The final peace was signed on 3 March [O.S. 19 February] 1886 in Bucharest. The existing boundaries did not change. As a result of the war, European powers acknowledged the act of Unification of Bulgaria which had happened on 18 September [O.S. 6 September] 1885.

== Background ==
On 18 September [O.S. 6 September] 1885, Bulgaria and the semi-autonomous Ottoman province of Eastern Rumelia declared their unification in the city of Plovdiv. Eastern Rumelia, whose population was predominantly ethnic Bulgarian, had been an artificial creation of the Berlin Congress seven years earlier.

The unification took place against the will of the Great Powers, including Russia. Austria-Hungary had been expanding its influence in the Balkans and was particularly opposed to the unification. Bulgaria's western neighbour, Serbia, also feared it would diminish its position in the Balkans. In addition, Serbia's ruler, Milan I (1868–1889), was annoyed that pro-Russian opposition leaders like Nikola Pašić, who had stirred up the Timok Rebellion, had found asylum in Bulgaria after the suppression of the rebellion by the Serbian Army.

After the declaration of unification, massive protests broke out in Greece for fear of the creation of a Greater Bulgarian state in the Balkans. They called upon the Greek government to declare war on Bulgaria. Serbia proposed to Greece a joint military action against Bulgaria, but Greece rejected the proposal.

Lured by Austria-Hungary's promises of support and territorial gains from Bulgaria (in return for concessions in the Western Balkans), Milan I declared war on Bulgaria on 14 November [O.S. 2 November] 1885. The military strategy relied largely on surprise, as Bulgaria expected an attack from the Ottoman Empire and had moved its troops to the area near the Ottoman border, to the southeast.

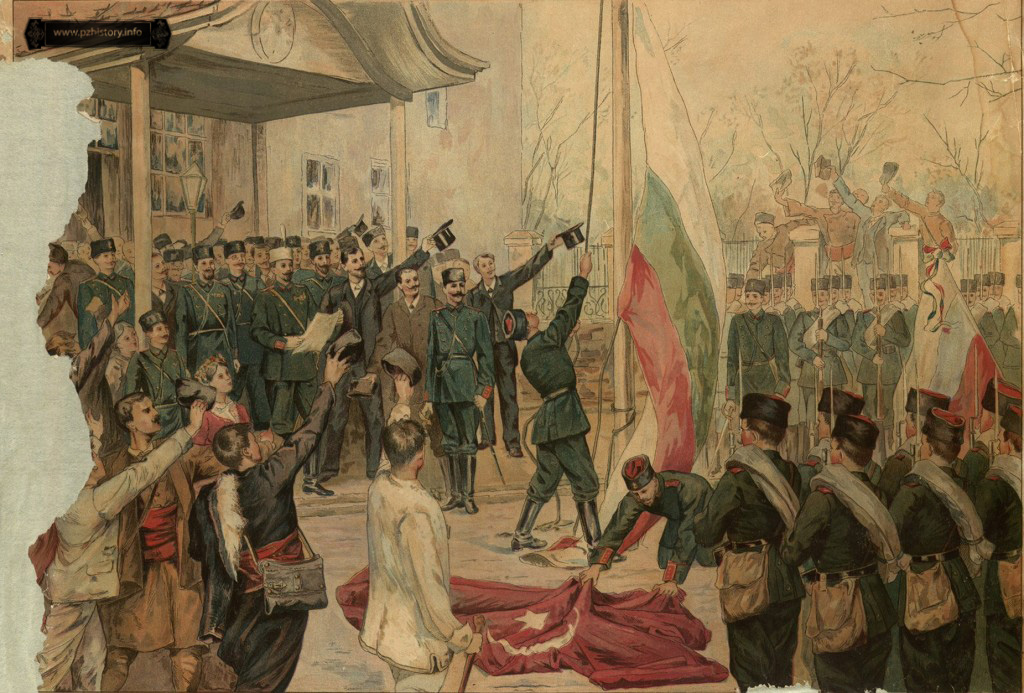
The declaration of unification between Bulgaria and Eastern Rumelia

The Serbian pretext was a minor border dispute, known as the Bregovo Dispute. Timok, which formed part of the border between the two countries, was a river that had slightly changed its course over the years. As a result, a Serbian border guardhouse near the village of Bregovo had found itself on the Bulgarian bank of the river. After some denied requests from Bulgaria to evacuate the guardhouse, Bulgaria expelled the Serbian troops by force.

Bulgarian sources, on the other hand, outlined several Serbian intrusions into Bulgarian territory as the start of hostilities. Bulgarian troops were positioned away from the border in order to not give Serbia cause for attack by defending the border by force. After several incursions, fire was finally exchanged on the 13th of November [O.S. 1 November] 1885.

As it happened, the Ottomans did not intervene, and the Serbian Army's advance was stopped after the Battle of Slivnitsa. The main body of the Bulgarian Army traveled from the Ottoman border in the southeast to the Serbian border in the northwest to defend the capital Sofia. After the defensive battles at Slivnitsa and Vidin (the latter's defence was organized by Atanas Uzunov), Bulgaria began an offensive which took the city of Pirot. Austria-Hungary then stepped in and threatened to join the war on Serbia's side if the Bulgarian troops did not pull back.

No territorial changes were made to either country, but the unification was recognised by the great powers. However, the relationship of trust and friendship between Serbia and Bulgaria, which had been built during their long common fight against Ottoman rule, suffered irreparable damage.

== Serbian Army ==
The Serbian army's infantry weaponry stood up to the most modern standards of the time (Mauser-Milovanović single fire rifles with excellent ballistic characteristics). However, the artillery was ill-equipped, still using muzzle-loading cannons of the La Hitte system. Breech-loading cannons of the De Bange system had been ordered and paid for, but did not arrive in Serbia until 1886. The total number of Serbian armed forces expected to take part in the military operation was about 60,000. King Milan I divided his force into two armies, the Nishava and Timok armies.

The former undertook the main objective, to overcome the Bulgarian defences along the west border, to conquer Sofia and advance towards the Ihtiman heights. It was there that the army was supposed to encounter and crush the Bulgarian forces coming from the southeast. Serbia's main advantages on paper were the better small arms and the highly educated commanders and soldiers, who had gained a great deal of experience from the last two wars against the Ottoman Empire.

However, internal Serbian problems, supplemented by King Milan's conduct of the war, nullified most of these advantages:

To claim all the glory for the victory he considered imminent, King Milan did not call upon the most famous commanders of the previous wars (Gen. Jovan Belimarković, Gen. Đura Horvatović and Gen. Milojko Lešjanin) to command the army. Instead, he took the position of army commander himself and gave most of the divisional commands to officers chosen primarily for their loyalty and not war records like Petar Topalović of the Morava division, who had previously commanded the troops suppressing the Timok Rebellion, which was militarily poorly organised.

Furthermore, underestimating the Bulgarian military strength and fearing mutinies for conducting such an unpopular war and having indeed experienced the Timok Rebellion two years earlier, he ordered the mobilisation of only the first class of infantry (recruits younger than 30 years), which meant mobilising only about half of the available Serbian manpower. In doing so, he deprived the Serbian Army of its veterans of the previous wars against the Ottoman Empire.

The modern rifles, despite being among the best in Europe at the time, still had issues of their own: they were introduced only two years before the outbreak of the war, and as such, many of the soldiers were not well-trained in their use. More importantly, the theoretical capabilities of the rifle often misled the Serbian officers, who still lacked experience with it, into ordering volleys from distances of half a mile or more, which wasted precious ammunition for negligible results.

Furthermore, the quantity of ammunition purchased was based on the consumption of bullets by the previous much older and slower-firing rifles. The situation was made worse still by the contemporary Serbian tactics, which emphasised firepower and downplayed hand-to-hand fighting, which contributed to heavy casualties in the fight for Neškov Vis to defend Pirot.

== Bulgarian Army ==
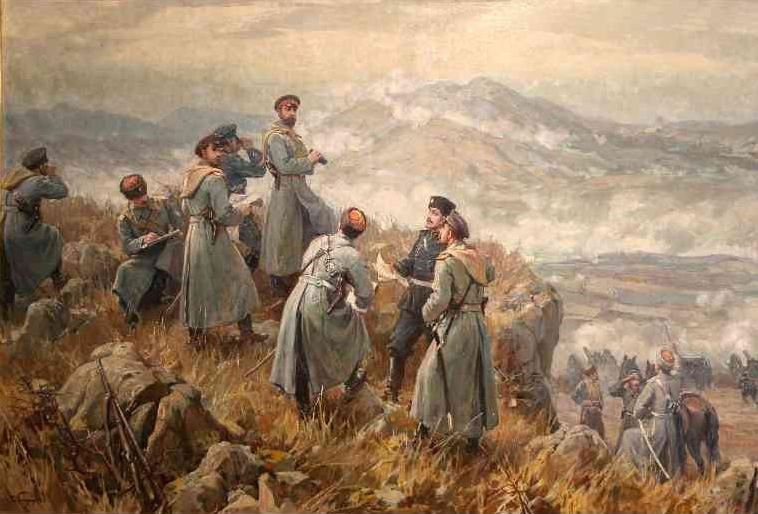
Alexander of Battenberg during the Battle of Slivnitsa.

Bulgaria was forced to meet the Serbian threat with two serious disadvantages. When the unification had been declared, Russia had withdrawn its military officers, who had until then commanded all larger units of Bulgaria's young army. The remaining Bulgarian officers had lower ranks and no experience in commanding units larger than platoons (causing the conflict to be dubbed "The War of the Captains"). Also, since the Bulgarian government had expected an attack from the Ottoman Empire, the main forces of the Bulgarian Army were along the southeastern border. Their redeployment across Bulgaria would take at least five to six days.

=== Advantages ===
Bulgaria's main advantages were its strong patriotic spirit and high morale since its men felt that they were fighting for a just cause. The same could not be said about Serbia, whose king had misled them in his manifesto to the army by telling the Serbian soldiers that they were being sent to help the Bulgarians in their war against the Ottomans, and the Serbian soldiers were initially surprised to find that they were fighting Bulgarians instead. Presumably, lying to his army was King Milan's only means to mobilise and command his troops without experiencing disobedience and unrest.

Furthermore, the Bulgarians had small arms that were inferior to those of the Serbs but had artillery that was greatly superior by featuring modern steel breech-loading cannons, designed by Krupp.

=== Strategic plan ===
There were two views on the Bulgarian strategy. The former, supported by Prince Alexander of Battenberg, saw the general battle on the Ihtiman heights. The drawback of the plan was that in that case, the capital Sofia had to be surrendered without battle. That could very well cause Serbia to stop the war and call in the arbitrage of the Great Powers. For that reason, the strategic plan that was finally selected by the Bulgarian command expected the main clash to be in the area of Slivnitsa. Captain Olimpi Panov had an important role in this final decision.

== Military activities ==
=== 16–19 November ===
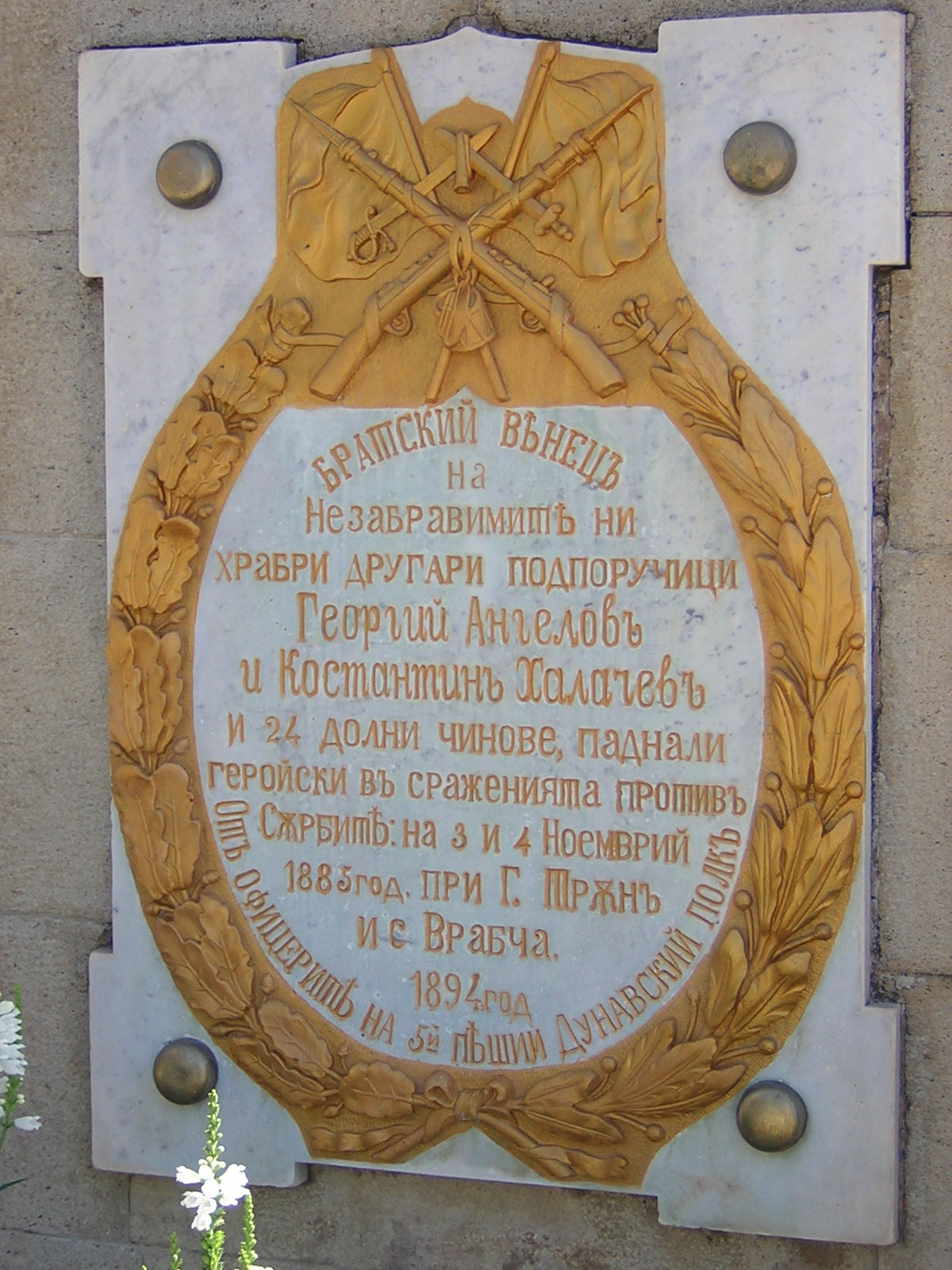
Monument in memory of officers and soldiers fallen in border skirmishes near Tran and Vrabcha.

Prince Alexander I arrived on the evening of 16 November to find a well-prepared defensive position manned by 9 battalions, plus some 2000 volunteers and 32 guns, commanded by Major Guchev. The position consisted of nearly 4 km of trenches and artillery redoubts on either side of the main road on a ridge in front of Slivnitsa city. To the right was steep mountainous terrain whilst the left wing had the easier Visker Hills towards Breznik.

The three Serbian centre divisions also arrived on 16 November and halted to recover after the fierce Bulgarian delaying action in the Dragoman Pass. The Morava division was at some distance from its objective, Breznik, which lay to the south. The northern advance was bogged down along the Danube.

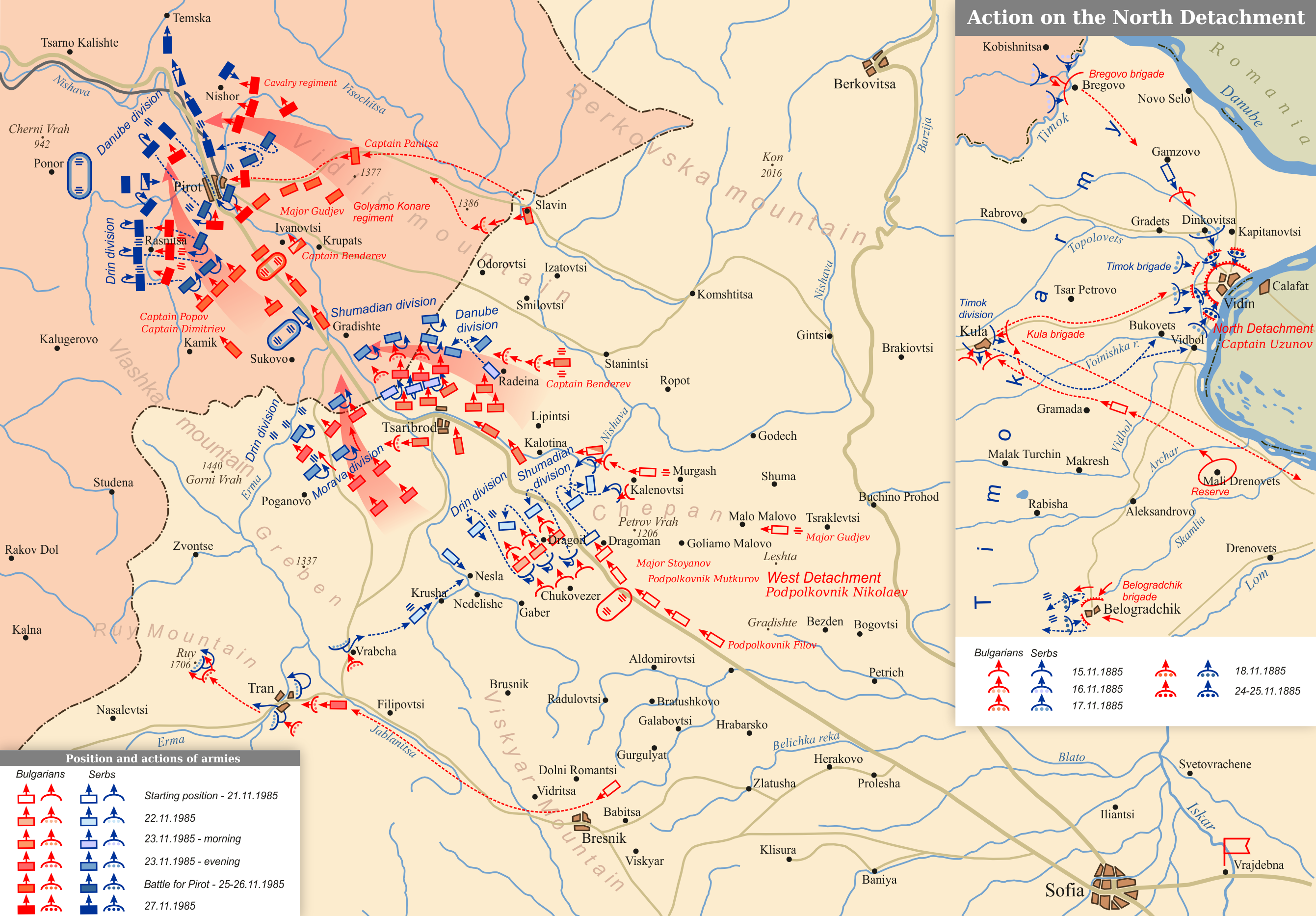
Counteroffensive of the Bulgarian Army (22-27.XI.1885)

The morning of 17 November came with rain and mist but not the expected Serbian attack. By 10 a.m., Alexander ordered three battalions to advance on the right. They surprised the Danube division, which eventually rallied and pushed them back. The main Serbian attack began on the centre largely unsupported by artillery that had insufficient range. The weight of Bulgarian fire forced them back with some 1,200 casualties. A relief column, led by Captain Benderev, recaptured the heights on the right and forced the Danube division back to the road.

At daybreak on 18 November, the Serbians attacked the weaker left flank of the Bulgarian line. Just in time, two battalions of the Preslav Regiment arrived to shore up the position. Further attacks in the centre were repulsed with heavy Serbian casualties and Benderev captured two further positions in the mountains.

On 19 November, the Serbians concentrated two divisions for an attack on the Bulgarian left near Karnul (today Delyan, Sofia Province) in an attempt to join up with the Morava division. However, three battalions of Bulgarian troops led by Captain Popov from Sofia had held the Morava division in the Visker Hills, and the flanking move failed. Alexander now ordered a counterattack which pushed the Serbians back on both flanks although nightfall prevented a complete collapse.

=== 19–28 November ===
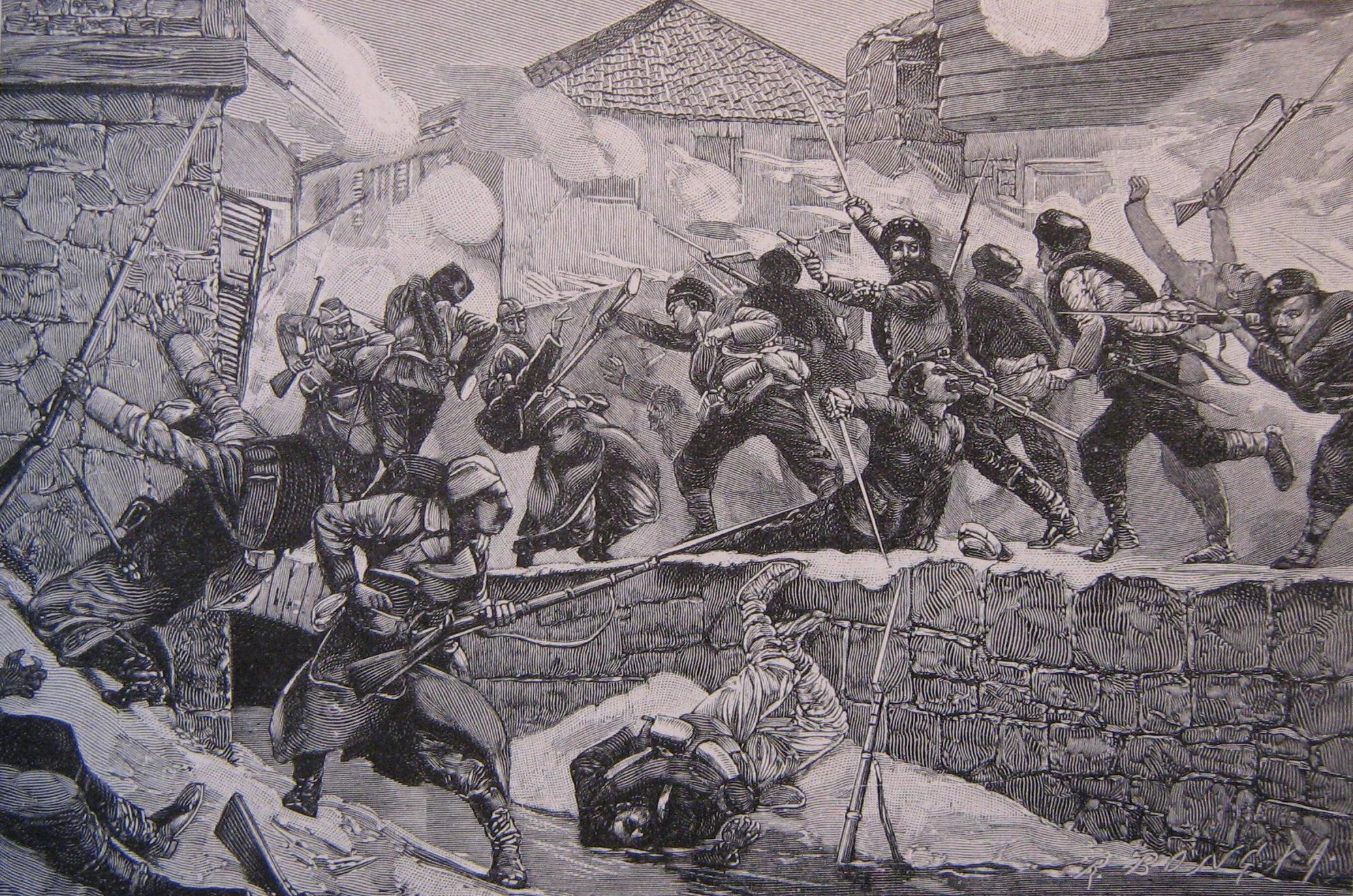
Street fighting in Pirot.

Slivnitsa was the decisive battle of the war. The Serbians fought only limited rearguard actions as they retreated and by 24 November were back in Serbia. The Timok Division, in the north, continued the Siege of Vidin until 29 November.

The main Bulgarian army crossed the border in two strong divisions (Guchev and Nikolaev), supported by flanking columns, and converged on Pirot. The Serbian Army dug in on the heights west of the town. On 27 November the Bulgarian Army flanked the right of the Serbian position with Prince Alexander personally leading the final attack. The Serbians abandoned Pirot, retreated towards Niš and called a general mobilization of their military reservists, but they did not arrive at the front before the ceasefire.

== End of war and peace treaty ==
The Serbian defeat made Austria-Hungary take action. On 28 November, the Viennese ambassador to Belgrade, Count Rudolf of Khevenhüller-Metsch, visited the headquarters of the Bulgarian Army and demanded the cessation of military actions. He threatened that otherwise, the Bulgarian forces would face Austro-Hungarian troops, and he also hinted at possible Russian intervention in support of Serbia. The ceasefire was signed on 28 November, but that did not stop the Serbians from continuing attempts to conquer Vidin with the idea to use it in negotiations later even after military activities had stopped on demand of their ally. On 3 March 1886, the peace treaty was signed in Bucharest. According to its terms, no changes were to be made along the Bulgarian-Serbian border.

The war was an important step in the strengthening of Bulgaria's international position. To a large extent, the victory preserved the Bulgarian unification. The defeat left a lasting scar on the Serbian military, which had been considered by the people to be undefeated. Ambitious reforms of the army were carried out, which later, in part, contributed to the end of the Obrenović dynasty.

King Milan's poor judgment and leadership are generally considered as the main reasons behind Serbia's defeat in the conflict. He believed the conflict would entail "taking a walk to Sofia" and thus mustered only one third of the Serbian army's manpower, as he was in constant fear of possible plots against him and wished to keep the rest of the military within Serbia's borders. Milan decided to declare war on his own personal whim and based on his own interpretation of the terms of the Congress of Berlin. The prominent Serbian statesman and politician Stojan Novaković and other Serbian political leaders did not share the king's enthusiasm for the war. Novaković advocated reaching a peaceful settlement with the Bulgarians and believed that the Balkan countries should co-operate, as had occurred during the rule of Prince Mihailo Obrenović. Novaković criticised Milan's actions as authoritarian, pretentious and unfounded.

The Serbian population was generally unenthusiastic, did not support the war, and did not understand the reasons behind it. According to the academic Slobodan Jovanović, the Serbian population generally viewed the conflict as Milan's "cabinet war". The politician Milan Piroćanac believed that Milan started the war not for patriotic reasons but instead his wish to secure funds from abroad to repay his numerous debts to the Austro-Hungarians. A number of Serb officers and civil servants were against the war and described the Bulgarians as the Serbs' "neighbours" and "Orthodox brothers". The academic Milan Đ. Milićević recounted that many Belgraders protested against the war and commented that Serbs and Bulgarians "are almost the same people". Milan's consort, Natalie, was also opposed to the war.

On the other hand, part of the Serbian military establishment fully supported the war effort by citing Bulgarian atrocities against Serbian civilians, including murder, theft and rape, in southern Serbia and what the Serbian leadership called Old Serbia, which was still under Ottoman control.

After the war, Milan turned his attention to modern-day North Macedonia, where Serbian and Bulgarian interests were conflicted. The Serbian Army and political elite drew numerous lessons from the war and proceeded to modernise and adapt the military and its tactics to the demands of modern warfare.

== In popular culture ==
- The Serbo-Bulgarian War forms the setting for George Bernard Shaw's 1894 play Arms and the Man as a depiction of the futility of war.

== See also ==
- Incident at Petrich, which led to the Greco-Bulgarian War

== Sources ==
- Ćirković, Sima (2004). The Serbs. Malden: Blackwell Publishing. ISBN 9781405142915.
- Crampton, Richard (1983). Bulgaria, 1878–1918: A History. East European Monographs. ISBN 9780880330299.
- Grogan, Ellinor F. B. (1923). "Bulgaria under Prince Alexander". The Slavonic Review. 1 (3): 561–571. JSTOR 4201653.
- Hertslet, Edward (1891). The Map of Europe by Treaty. Vol. IV (1875–1891) (First ed.). London: Harrison and Sons. ( Public domain)
- Jelavich, Charles (1962). Tsarist Russia and Balkan Nationalism: Russian Influence in the Internal Affairs of Bulgaria and Serbia, 1879–1886. University of California Press.
- Khristov, Khristo Angelov (1985). The Unification of Northern and Southern Bulgaria in 1885. Sofia Press.
- MacDermott, Mercia (1962). A History of Bulgaria 1393–1885. Frederick A. Praeger.
- von Huhn, Arthur Ernst (1886). The Struggle of the Bulgarians for National Independence Under Prince Alexander: A Military and Political History of the War Between Bulgaria and Servia in 1885. J. Murray.

=== Other languages ===
- Bataković, Dušan T., ed. (2005). Histoire du peuple serbe [History of the Serbian People] (in French). Lausanne: L’Age d’Homme. ISBN 9782825119587.
- Đorđević, Vladan (1908). "Историја српско-бугарског рата 1885 – књига прва". Belgrade: Издање задужбине И. М. Коларца.
- Đorđević, Vladan (1908). "Историја српско-бугарског рата 1885 - књига друга". Belgrade: Издање задужбине И. М. Коларца.
- Jovanović, Slobodan (1927). Vlada Milana Obrenovića: 1878–1889. Izdavačka knjižarnica Gece Kona.
- Krestić, Petar V., ed. (2007). Novovekovne srpske dinastije u memoaristici. Belgrade: Institute of history. ISBN 9788677430665.
- Rastović, Aleksandar (2000). Велика Британија и Србија (1878–1889) [Great Britain and Serbia (1878–1889)]. Istorijski institut. ISBN 978-86-355-0463-6.
- Stojančević, Vladimir (1986). "Из проблематике српско–бугарског рата 1885". Résumé. 32: 187–208.
- Vučković, Vojislav J. (1956). Дипломатска Историја Српско-бугарског Рата, 1885–1886 [Histoire Diplomatique de la Guerre Serbo-bulgare, 1885–1886.].
