= Kalimanci, Vinica =

Kalimanci Калиманци
- Village
- Location within North Macedonia
- Coordinates: 41.973149°N 22.615713°E
- Country: North Macedonia
- Region: Eastern
- Municipality: Vinica

Population (2002)
  - Total: 239
- Time zone: UTC+1 (CET)
  - Summer (DST): UTC+2 (CEST)
- Website: .

Kalimanci (Macedonian: Калиманци) is a village in the municipality of Vinica, North Macedonia.

== Demographics ==
According to the 2002 census, the village had a total of 239 inhabitants. Ethnic groups in the village include:

- Macedonians 239
