= Kukulovce =

- Village
- Location within Serbia
- Coordinates: 42°56′15″N 21°54′00″E
- Country: Serbia
- District: Jablanica District
- Municipality: Leskovac

Population (2002)
  - Total: 298
- Time zone: UTC+1 (CET)
  - Summer (DST): UTC+2 (CEST)

Kukulovce is a village in the municipality of Leskovac, Serbia. According to the 2002 census, the village had a population of 298 people.
