= Grdanica =

- Village
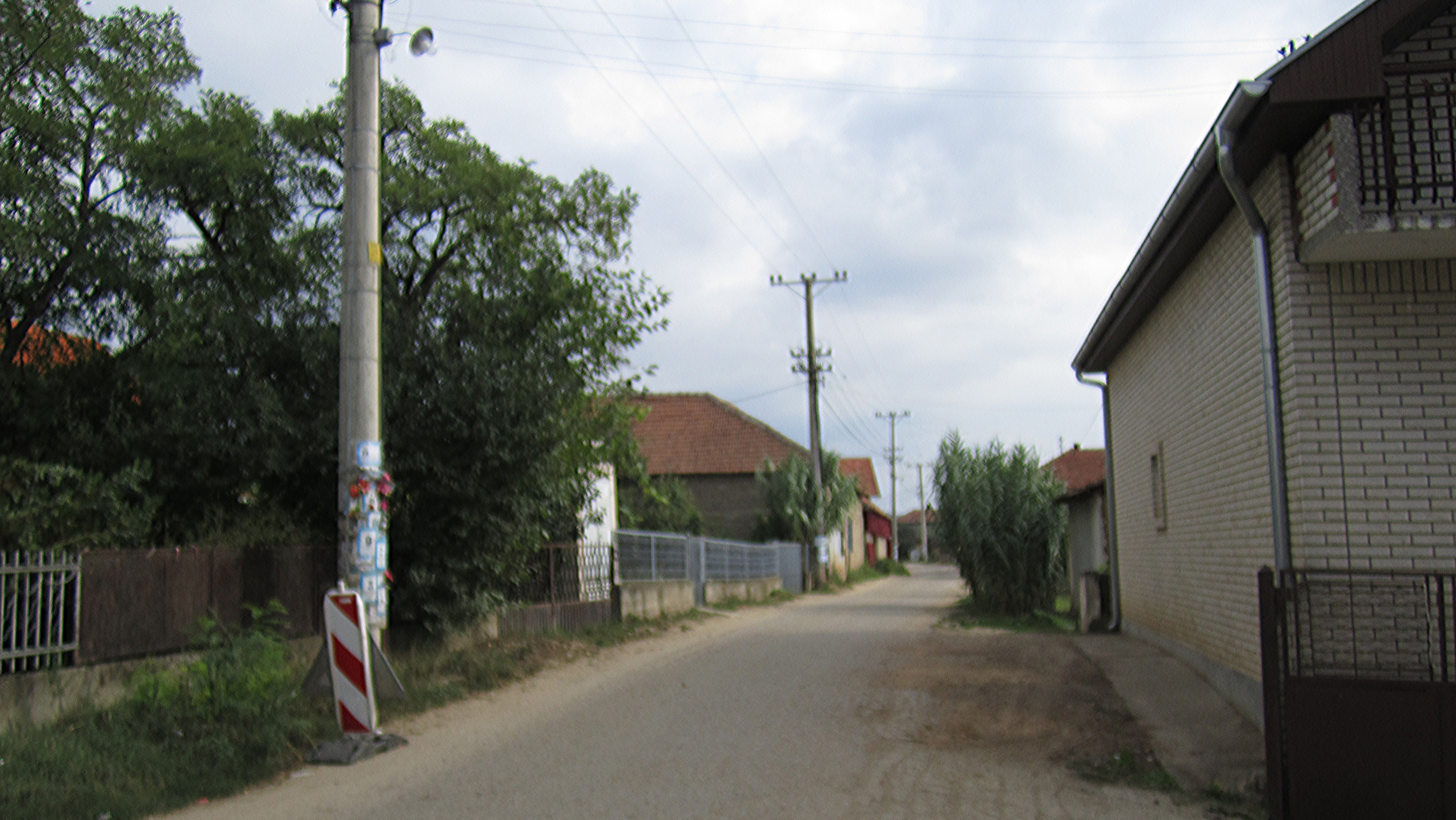

- Location within Serbia
- Coordinates: 43°07′47″N 21°56′27″E
- Country: Serbia
- District: Jablanica District
- Municipality: Leskovac
- Elevation: 958 ft (292 m)

Population (2002)
  - Total: 605
- Time zone: UTC+1 (CET)
  - Summer (DST): UTC+2 (CEST)

Grdanica is a village in the municipality of Leskovac, Serbia. According to the 2002 census, the village has a population of 605 people.
