= Ravni Del (Leskovac) =

Ravni Del Равни Дел
- Village
- Location within Serbia
- Coordinates: 42°43′03″N 21°46′20″E
- Country: Serbia
- District: Jablanica District
- Municipality: Leskovac

Population (2017)
  - Total: 27
- Time zone: UTC+1 (CET)
  - Summer (DST): UTC+2 (CEST)

Ravni Del is a village in the municipality of Leskovac, Serbia. In 2017 the village had a population of 27 people.
