= Brejanovce =

- Village
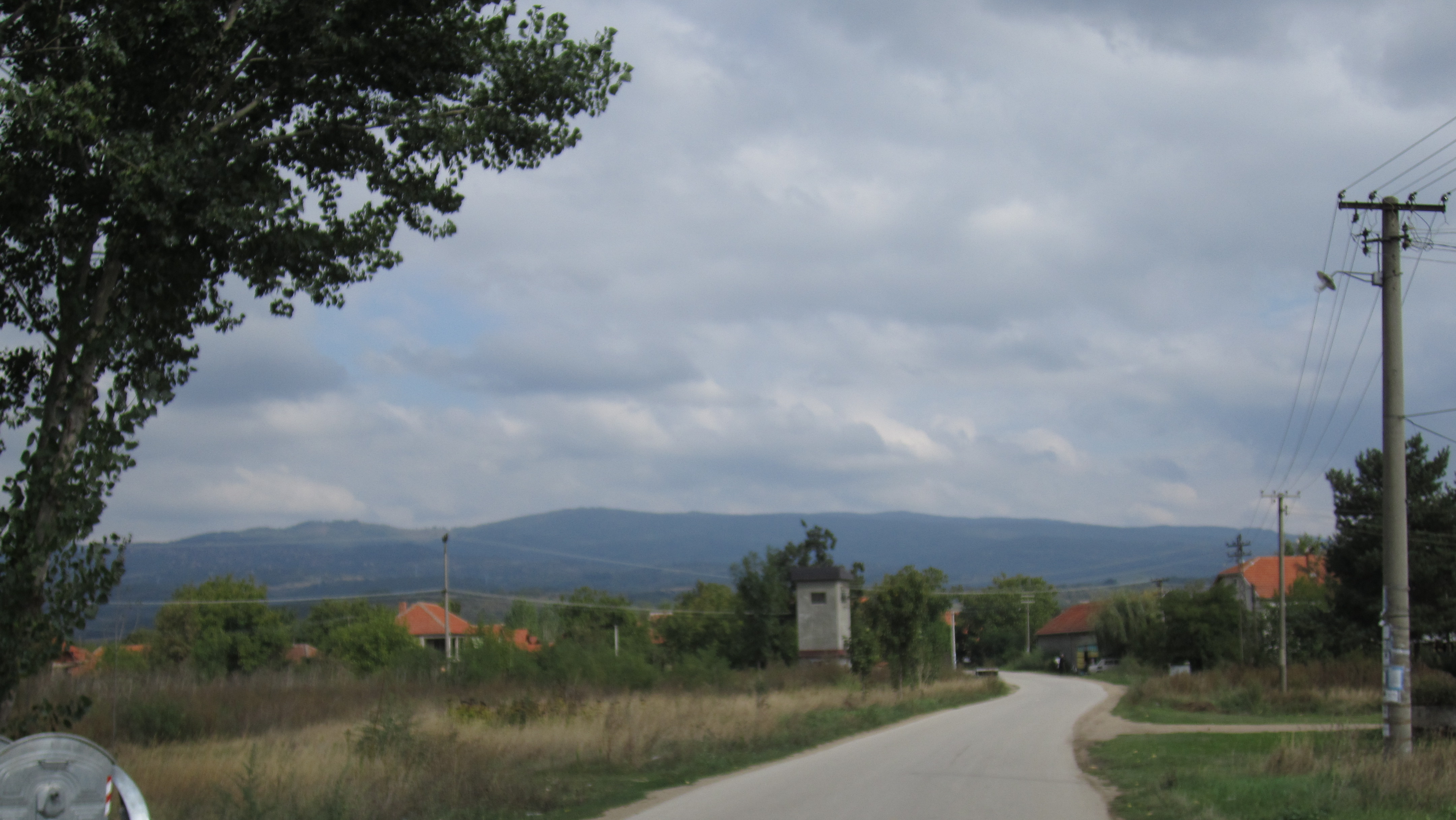
- Brejanovce

- Location within Serbia
- Coordinates: 43°06′12″N 21°56′33″E
- Country: Serbia
- District: Jablanica District
- Municipality: Leskovac
- Elevation: 705 ft (215 m)

Population (2002)
  - Total: 364
- Time zone: UTC+1 (CET)
  - Summer (DST): UTC+2 (CEST)

Brejanovce is a village in the municipality of Leskovac, Serbia. According to the 2002 census, the village has a population of 364 people.
