= Leskovac =

City in southern Serbia

Leskovac Лесковац (Serbian)
- City
- City of Leskovac
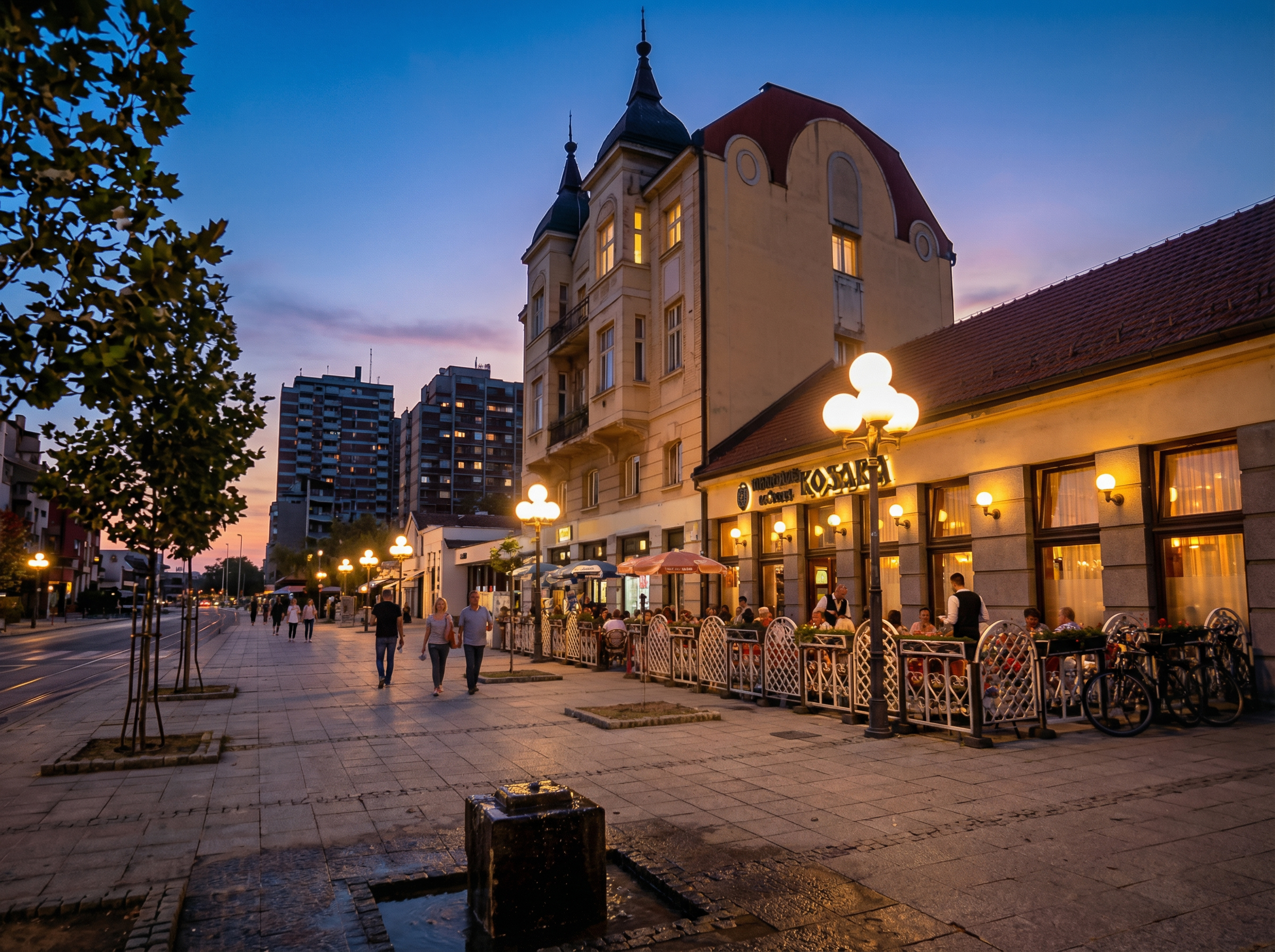
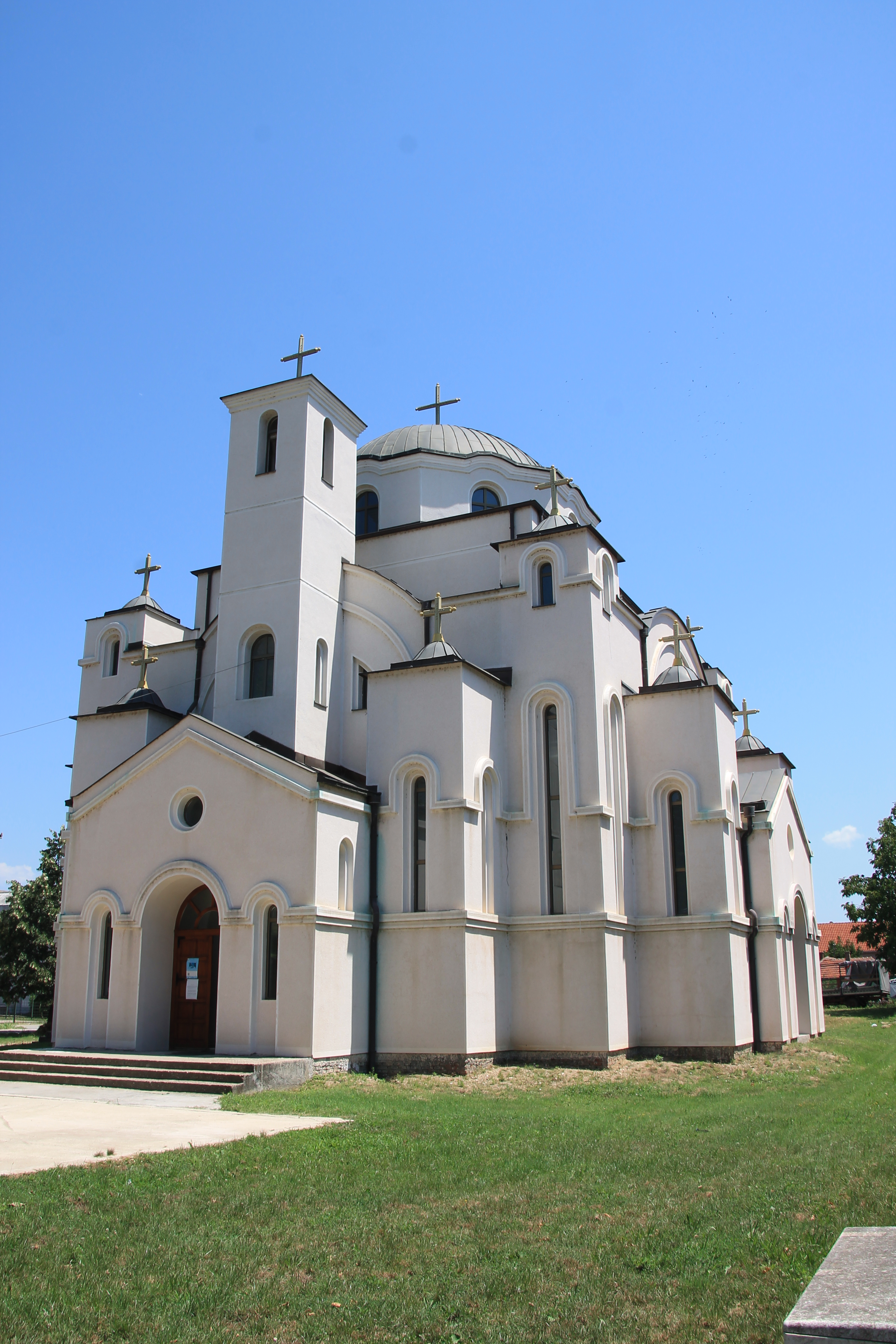
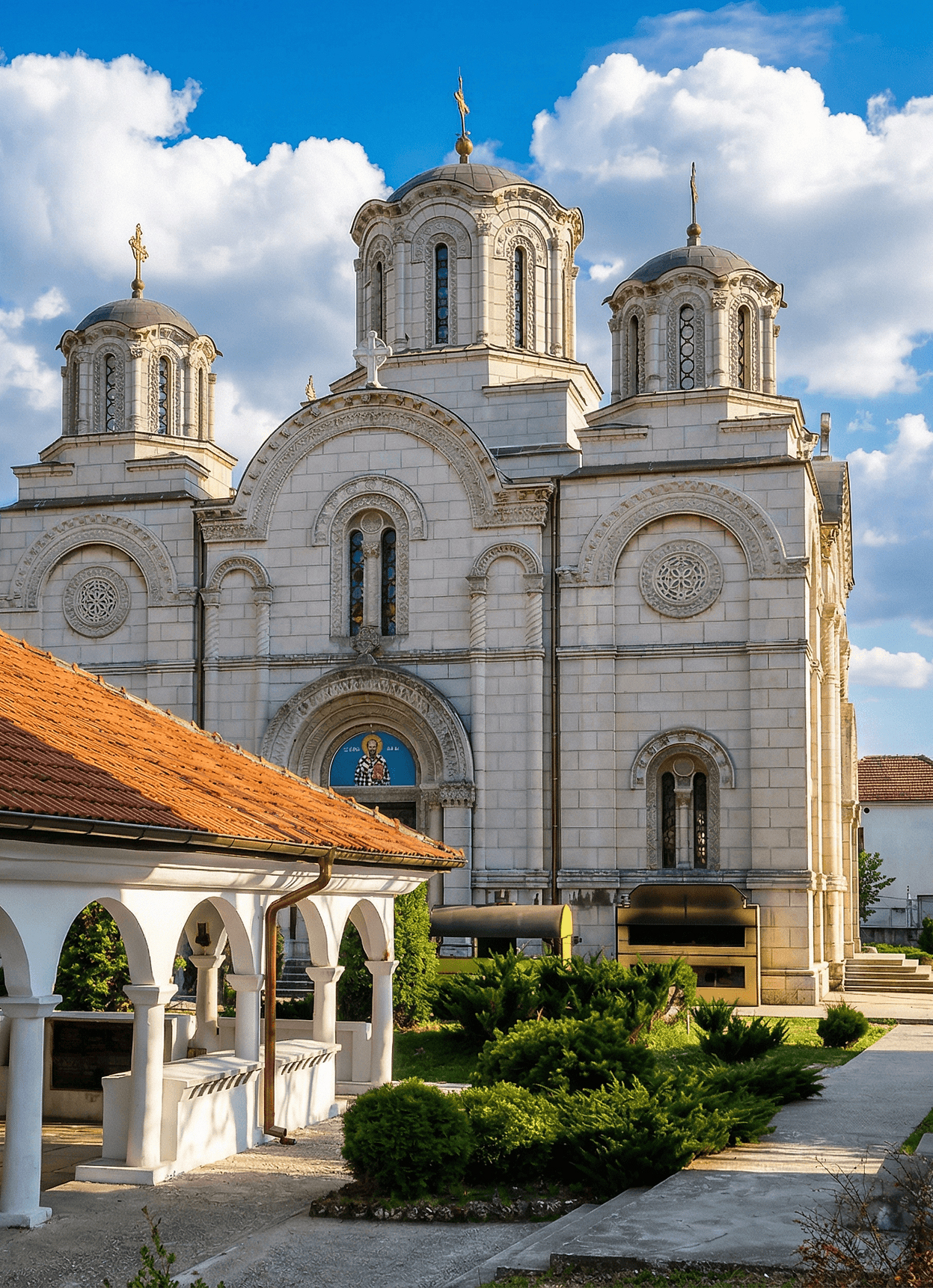
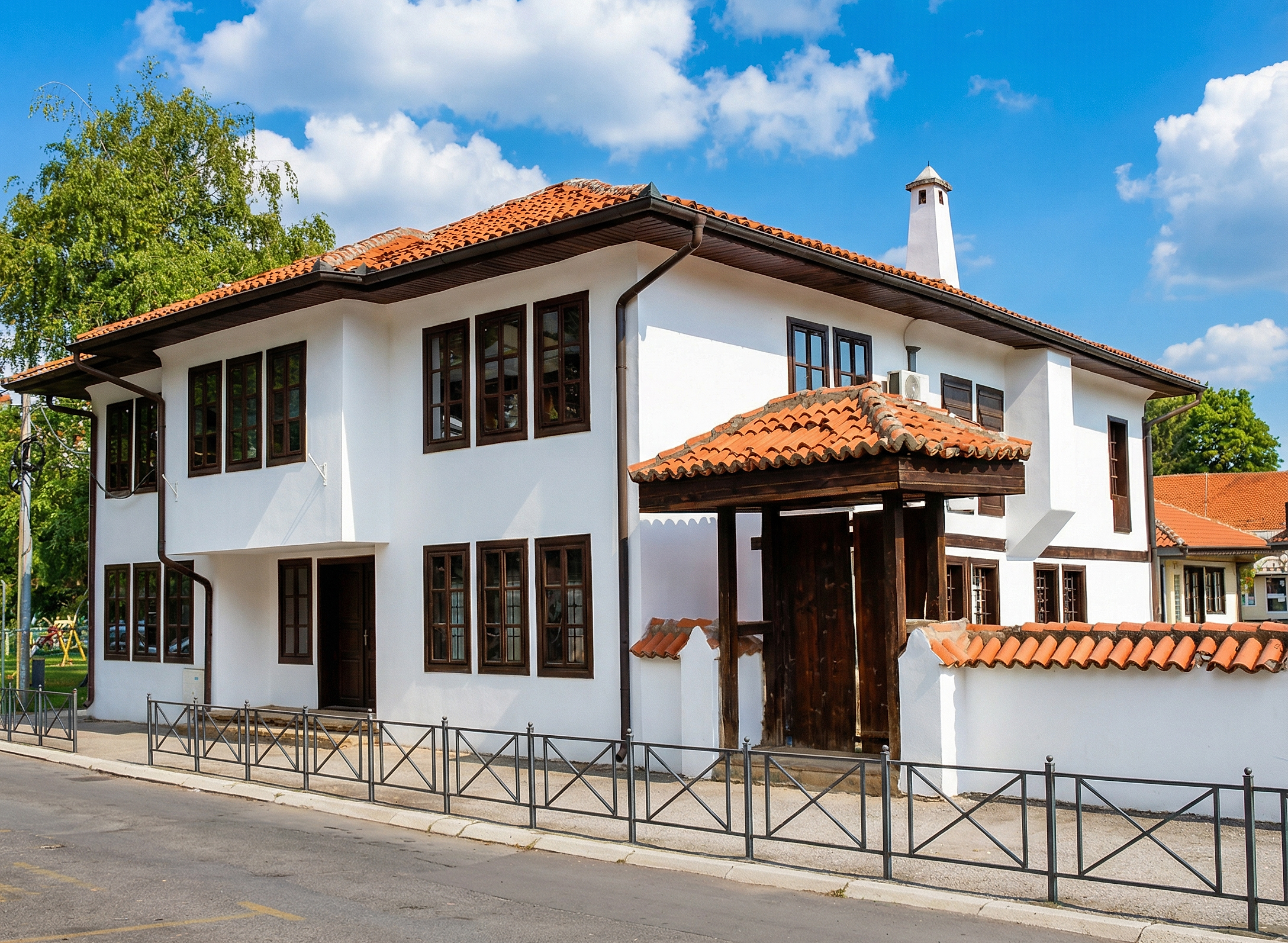
- Široka Čaršija with the Cultural Center at Night Church of St. Simeon the Myrrh-streaming Holy Trinity Church Šop-Đokić's House

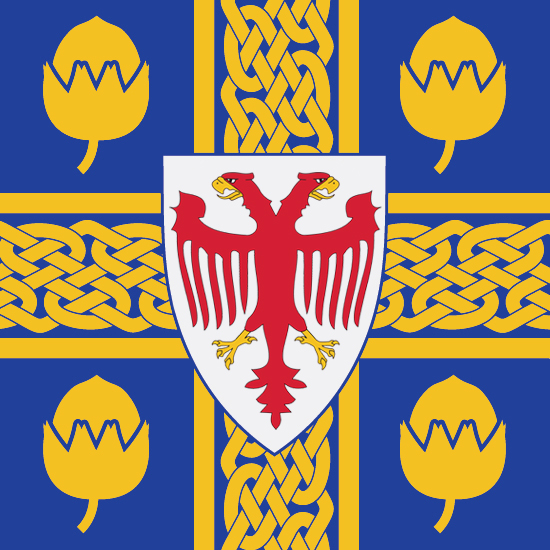
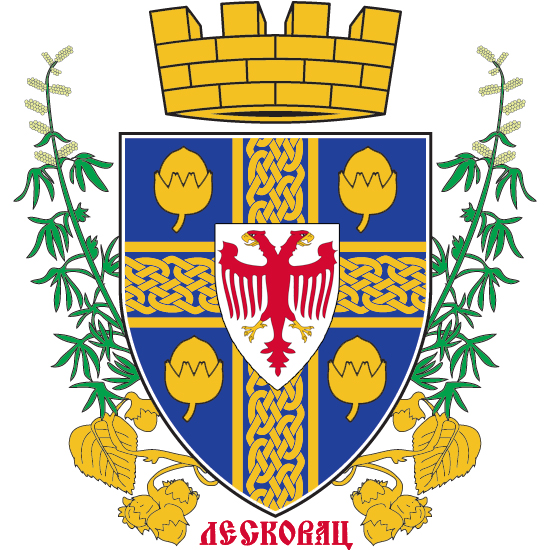
- Flag Coat of arms

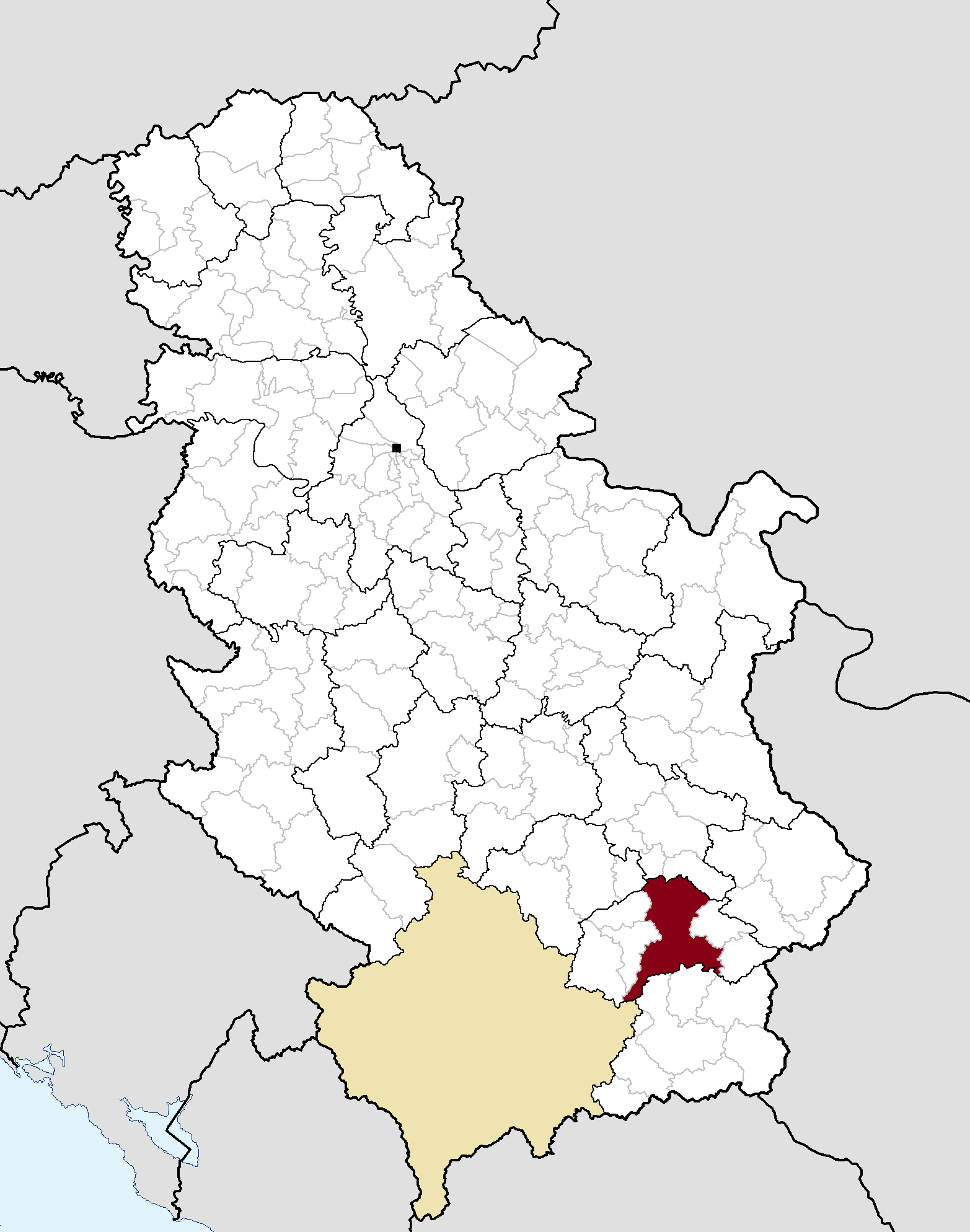
- Location of the city of Leskovac within Serbia
- Coordinates: 43°00′N 21°57′E
- Country: Serbia
- Region: Southern and Eastern Serbia
- District: Jablanica
- Settlements: 144

Government
  - Mayor: Goran Cvetanović (SNS)

Area
  - Rank: 5th in Serbia
  - Urban: 31.27 km^{2} (12.07 sq mi)
  - Administrative: 1,025 km^{2} (396 sq mi)
- Elevation: 228 m (748 ft)

Population (2022 census)
  - Rank: 6th in Serbia
  - Urban: 58,338
  - Urban density: 1,866/km^{2} (4,832/sq mi)
  - Administrative: 123,950
  - Administrative density: 120.9/km^{2} (313.2/sq mi)
- Time zone: UTC+1 (CET)
  - Summer (DST): UTC+2 (CEST)
- Postal code: 16000
- Area code: +381(0)16
- Car plates: LE
- Website: www.gradleskovac.org

Leskovac (Serbian Cyrillic: Лесковац, pronounced [lěskoʋats]) is a city and the administrative center of the Jablanica District in southern Serbia. It is situated in the Leskovac Depression (Leskovačka kotlina), by the small river of Veternica, near the confluence point with South Morava. According to the 2022 census, the city itself has a population of 58,338 while the city administrative area has 123,950 inhabitants.

The town, as a village, was first mentioned during the reign of emperor Stefan Dušan (r. 1331–1355). During the Ottoman period, Leskovac became an administrative centre and a notable craftsman's and merchant town. Following liberation in the late 19th century, the town became important in the textile industry and expanded to become the third largest urban area in the state. After German occupation in World War II, it was heavily bombed by the Allies in 1944, which left much of the town destroyed. Located in the southeast of Serbia, Leskovac is regarded the meat capital, with an annual six-day grill festival showcasing specialties such as Pljeskavica, Ćevapi, Mućkalica, rotisserie, and paprika.

== Etymology ==
The toponym is Slavic, derived from the Old Slavic root lěska, meaning "hazel tree (corylus avellana)", and is widespread in Slavic countries.

== Geography ==
Leskovac is situated in the heart of the vast and fertile Leskovac Depression (Leskovačka kotlina) (50 km (31 mi) long and 45 km (28 mi) wide), the small Veternica river, at the foot of Hisar, in the central part of the Leskovac valley. Leskovac lies at an altitude of 228 meters, in a basin that covers 2,250 km^{2} (869 sq mi). Around the valley are mountains Radan and Pasjača the west, Kukavica and Čemernik in the south and Babička Gora, Seličevica and Suva Planina to the east.

The largest river in the Leskovac region is the South Morava, which flows south to north. Tributaries of the South Morava are: the Vlasina river, which collects water from Lake Vlasina and flows through Crna Trava and Vlasotince; the Veternica river, which flows through Leskovac; the Jablanica river, which springs from the foot of Goljak and flows through Medveđa and Lebane; the Pusta river, which starts on Radan mountain, fills Lake Brestovačko and flows through Bojnik. The river Vučjanka, which springs from the Kukavica mountain, flows through Vučje and is a tributary of the Veternica river. Also known in the Leskovac region are Kozaračka, Predejanska, Kopašnička and Sušica rivers.

=== Climate ===
Leskovac has a humid subtropical climate (Cfa) with continental influences, with long, hot summers and short but cold, cloudy winters.

Climate data for Leskovac (1991–2020, extremes 1961–2020)
Month	Jan	Feb	Mar	Apr	May	Jun	Jul	Aug	Sep	Oct	Nov	Dec	Year
Record high °C (°F)	20.0 (68.0)	24.8 (76.6)	27.8 (82.0)	32.6 (90.7)	35.0 (95.0)	38.6 (101.5)	43.7 (110.7)	41.3 (106.3)	37.4 (99.3)	35.0 (95.0)	28.6 (83.5)	21.4 (70.5)	43.7 (110.7)
Mean daily maximum °C (°F)	4.8 (40.6)	8.0 (46.4)	13.3 (55.9)	18.7 (65.7)	23.4 (74.1)	27.5 (81.5)	30.0 (86.0)	30.5 (86.9)	25.1 (77.2)	19.1 (66.4)	12.4 (54.3)	5.7 (42.3)	18.2 (64.8)
Daily mean °C (°F)	0.2 (32.4)	2.4 (36.3)	6.9 (44.4)	11.8 (53.2)	16.4 (61.5)	20.4 (68.7)	22.3 (72.1)	22.0 (71.6)	16.8 (62.2)	11.5 (52.7)	6.4 (43.5)	1.7 (35.1)	11.6 (52.9)
Mean daily minimum °C (°F)	−3.6 (25.5)	−2.1 (28.2)	1.3 (34.3)	5.3 (41.5)	9.9 (49.8)	13.5 (56.3)	14.7 (58.5)	14.3 (57.7)	10.5 (50.9)	6.0 (42.8)	1.9 (35.4)	−1.6 (29.1)	5.8 (42.4)
Record low °C (°F)	−30.5 (−22.9)	−26.8 (−16.2)	−18.2 (−0.8)	−6.1 (21.0)	−1.7 (28.9)	2.7 (36.9)	5.4 (41.7)	4.4 (39.9)	−3.8 (25.2)	−8.7 (16.3)	−19.6 (−3.3)	−21.7 (−7.1)	−30.5 (−22.9)
Average precipitation mm (inches)	46.2 (1.82)	45.5 (1.79)	52.1 (2.05)	62.8 (2.47)	69.4 (2.73)	61.7 (2.43)	51.2 (2.02)	45.1 (1.78)	52.2 (2.06)	60.7 (2.39)	55.5 (2.19)	58.2 (2.29)	660.6 (26.01)
Average precipitation days (≥ 0.1 mm)	13.9	12.5	12.5	12.9	14.2	11.0	8.5	7.3	9.7	10.4	11.3	14.0	138.2
Average snowy days	9.0	7.4	4.7	0.8	0.0	0.0	0.0	0.0	0.0	0.3	2.8	7.6	32.6
Average relative humidity (%)	81.6	76.1	69.0	67.6	69.8	66.9	63.8	64.3	71.1	76.7	79.7	83.1	72.5
Mean monthly sunshine hours	67.0	88.3	146.1	178.6	219.6	264.6	301.2	293.0	202.6	139.8	84.8	50.5	2,036.1
Source: Republic Hydrometeorological Service of Serbia

== History ==
=== Archaeology ===
The Leskovac region has archaeological sites of the Neolithic, Aeneolithic, Bronze Age and Iron Age. The first excavations began after World War II. The Hisar hill site on the southwestern periphery of Leskovac, has finds of the Neolithic, later Aeneolithic (Bubanj-Hum II), later Bronze Age (Brnjica culture), Iron Age I and Iron Age III.

=== Middle Ages ===
Leskovac is mentioned for the first time in the 14th century, as a donated village in the charter of emperor Stefan Dušan (r. 1331–1355) to the Serbian Orthodox monastery Hilandar on Mount Athos. It belonged to the župa (county) of Glbočica/Dubočica, which is mentioned since the 12th century as a possession of the Nemanjić dynasty. The area was caught up in the Serbian–Ottoman conflict in the first half of the 15th century, and Dubočica was once given as dowry to Sultan Mehmed II with his marriage to Serbian princess Mara (1433), then returned, and defended by Nikola Skobaljić (1454–1456), until definitively lost with the conquest of Smederevo (1459) and fall of Serbia.

=== Ottoman period ===
Dubočica with centre in Leskovac was transformed into a nahiya, part of the sanjak of Kruševac, of which it was the largest nahiya. Leskovac was also the seat of a kadi (Islamic judge), who had a larger territorial responsibility than just the nahiya. Muslims came to inhabit the exterior settlement of the Leskovac castle (Hisar) and by the left banks of Veternica, while Christians lived on the right banks. With time, Leskovac received an Oriental design (kasaba) with mosques, hammams, tekkes, and the neighbourhoods (mahala) were named after professions, as Leskovac became a craftsman's town. The town became an important marketplace thanks to Ottoman feudals and Christian merchants. The Ottoman aristocracy endowed construction (waqf). During the Ottoman period, the town was known in Turkish as Leskovçe or Hisar ("fortress").

In 1594, the town burnt along with Skopje, likely as a result of the Uprising in Banat. During the Great Turkish War, the Austrian army with Serbian volunteers, led by Piccolomini, took Bela Palanka, Pirot, Niš, Leskovac, Prokuplje in the short-lived occupation (c. 1689). 18th- and 19th-century traveling accounts describe Leskovac as a large town. Since 1737, the town was the centre of the Pashalik of Leskovac, as governed by a pasha. The second Great Serb Migration saw depopulation in the area. During the Austro-Turkish War (1788–1791), the local Živko Milinović volunteered in the Serbian Free Corps and became a captain, and the area of Leskovac rose up in rebellion. The monasteries in Jašunja burnt during that time. The First Serbian Uprising (1804–1813) included operations in South Morava, especially in the Toplica and Niš areas, and echoed to Vlasina, Masurica, Veternica and Jablanica. In 1807, rebel commander Ilija Strelja defeated Şaşit Pasha of Leskovac, but the rebels were unable to take the town, though they managed to take villages in the surroundings. In 1809, Leskovac was besieged, but the rebels were forced to retreat after the failed siege of Niš. Leskovac remained outside Serbia. In the mid-1830s, the Pashalik of Leskovac was dissolved and the Leskovac kaza became a mütesellimlik of the Sanjak of Niš. Despite reform initiatives of Sultan Mahmud II, the Serbs were still far inferior in status in relation to the Muslims. There was an intensified immigration of Muslim Albanians from the Pristina kaza into the Serb villages. Towards the mid-19th century, the status of the Leskovac villagers deteriorated, with violence and injustice, and they petitioned Serbian ruler Miloš Obrenović for help. The cultural progression within the Serb community from the late 18th- to mid-19th century was notably contributed to by the small Greek-Aromanian community. The failure to improve the status of Christians led to rebellion: In 1840, priest Đorđe Janković gathered villagers of Leskovac and its surroundings into a revolutionary organization, and in April 1841 a large rebellion broke out in South Morava, including Leskovac, where rebels were led by priest Đorđe, Koca Mumdžija, Pavle and Rista. The rebels were decisively defeated by the Ottoman army. In 1850, some conspirators in Niš and Leskovac were arrested following Omar Pasha's inquiry. In 1858, Leskovac had 3,000 households, out of which 2,400 were Christian, 500 Muslim, 30 Romani and 10 Jewish. In 1859–60 several revolutionary groups were established in Niš and Leskovac, but no rebellion broke out, due to Serbia's unwillingness to support. The Bulgarian Exarchate (formed in 1872) was refused in Leskovac and its agents were banished.

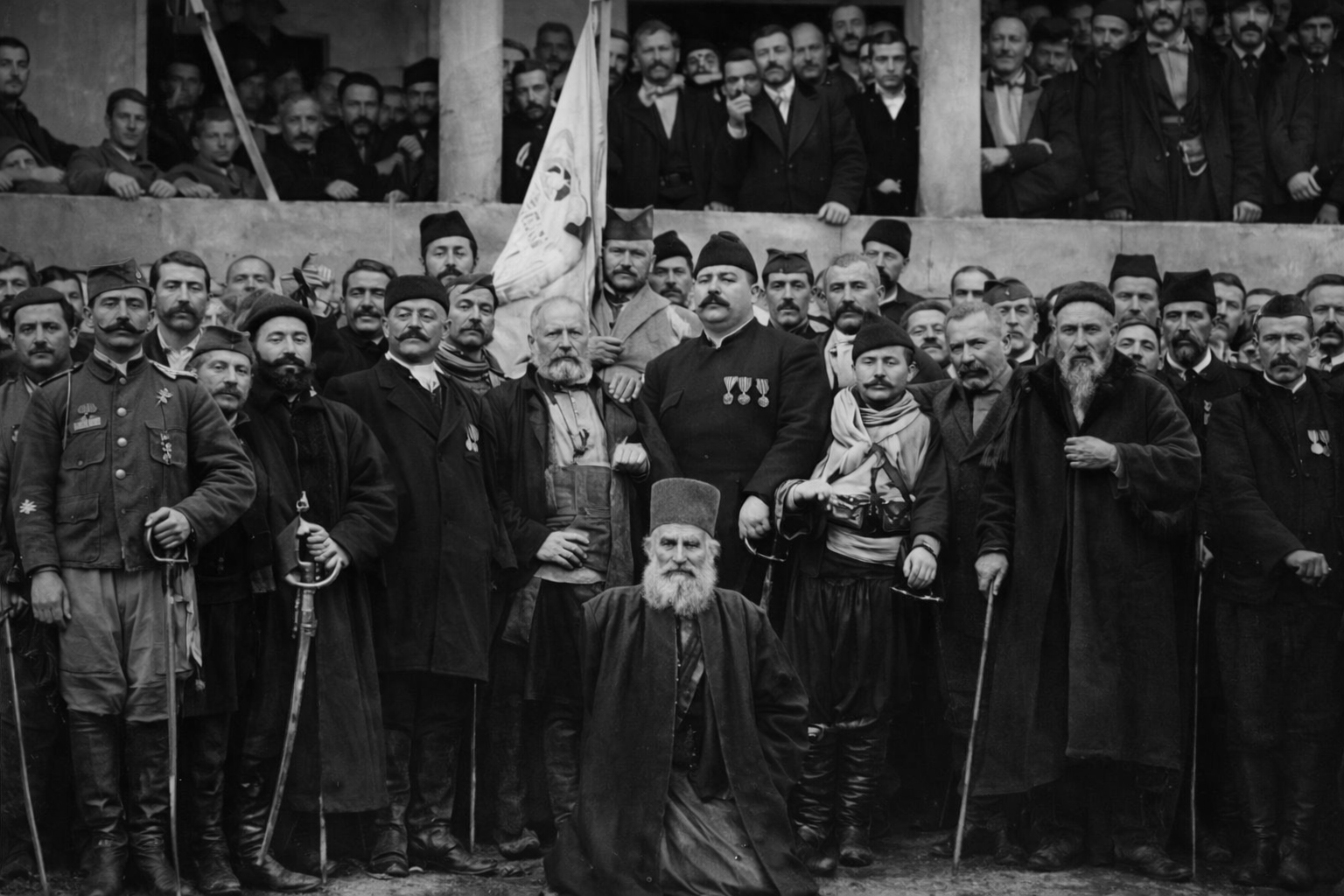
Celebration of liberation, 1877.

Serbian-Ottoman conflict broke out in 1876, with significant Serbian losses and a signed truce, then Russia declared war in April 1877 and Serbia continued operations in December 1877, taking Niš, Pirot, Bela Palanka, Kuršumlija, while Leskovac and Vlasotince were liberated by the locals. The Serbian acquisitions and sight of scouts led to panic in the Muslim population of Leskovac, which fled. An Ottoman force with Albanian refugees from Leskovac planned to attack the town but they were defeated at Vučje on 22 December 1877. By the end of the Serbian–Turkish Wars (1876–1878), 700 Muslim houses in Leskovac town were abandoned, and a total of 16,976 Muslim Albanians had moved out of the county/district of Leskovac; the Muslim refugees moved to Mitrovica, Prizren, Kumanovo, Veles, Skopje, Serres, Thessaloniki. Leskovac became part of Serbia with the Treaty of Berlin (1878).

=== Late 19th century to present ===
Leskovac was part of a textile industry network from the Black Sea to the central Balkans, and exported duty-free to Bulgaria, from where Serbia imported machinery. Independence initially had a negative impact though trade barriers, tariffs and open hostilities between Serbia and Bulgaria necessitated the acquisition and development of technology for rope- and industrial hemp-processing. By the mid-1880s business development, particularly the textile sector enabled Leskovac to become the third largest urban area after Belgrade and Niš at the time. The establishment of a railway line linking Leskovac with Belgrade, Skopje and Thessaloniki in 1886 also significantly contributed to the development of the town. The industrial success led to Leskovac being nicknamed Serbia's "Little Manchester" (Mali Mančester), as Manchester was a British textile powerhouse. A vocational textile school opened 1890 and in 1903 the second hydroelectric power plant in Serbia was built on the nearby Vučjanka river. The growing customs dispute with Austria-Hungary following the May Coup precipitated protectionism throughout the 1900s which served to nourish the local economy.

Following the Serbian campaign of 1915 Leskovac fell within the Bulgarian occupational zone. This period was marked by harsh repression with attempts at Bulgarisation of the local inhabitants. Numerous crimes were committed on the Leskovac citizenry with 2,000-4,000 victims being executed and a great many more massacred in the surrounding region. During the occupation Leskovac was also adversely affected by a typhus epidemic and widespread malnutrition. Bulgaria capitulation to the Entente on 30 September 1918, and Leskovac was liberated on 7 October 1918 in an offensive led by Field Marshal Petar Bojović's 1st Serbian Corps, which repelled the Austro-Hungarian 9th and German 11th Divisions. Cheering crowds gathered to welcome the Serbian Army's Dinarska and Dunavska divisions as they entered the city accompanied by French cavalry units.

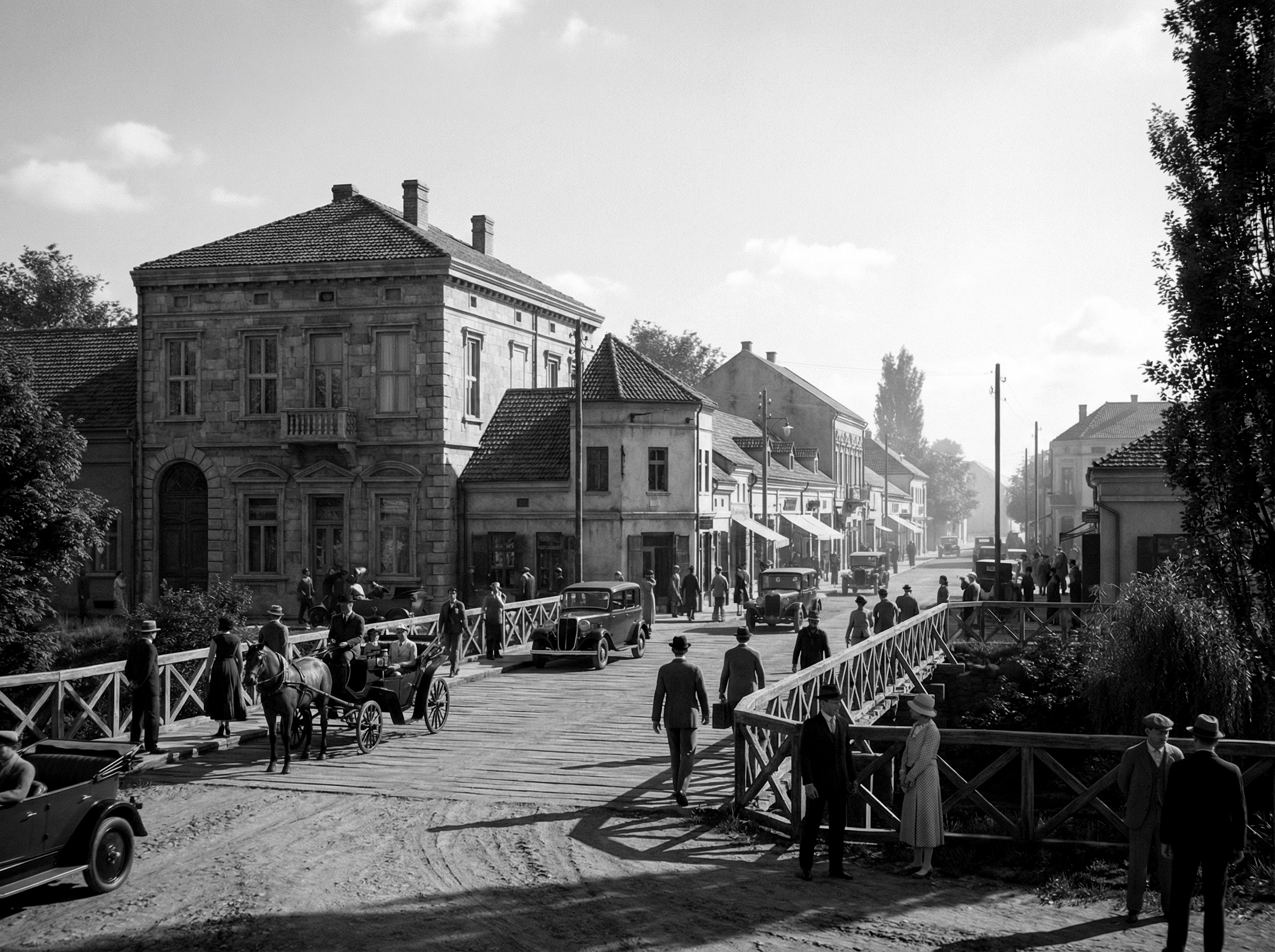
Leskovac main market, year 1930.

Following the war Leskovac continued its fast economic and social transformation. The townsfolk practised a cultural medley of both Oriental and European habits, whilst the social fabric was dominated by affluent, often competing industrialists families and greater social disparity within the community. Industrial development facilitated trade union agitation amongst an emerging urban working-class. In August 1920 Leskovac became one of the first municipalities to elect the Communist Party, however, it was quickly suppressed by the authorities.

Despite its rise as a regional manufacturing centre the town still lacked basic infrastructure during the interwar period such as a running water supply, sewerage system, paved streets (with only three asphalted in 1938) and a permanent marketplace. Leskovac experienced a significant influx of largely peasant workers leading to poor housing conditions with many affected by squalor, alcoholism, a high mortality rate and labour exploitation. From 1929 to 1941, Leskovac was part of the Vardar Banovina of the renamed Kingdom of Yugoslavia.

Nazi Germany invaded Yugoslavia in April 1941, and there were air raids and skirmishes in southeastern Serbia, including Leskovac, until 11 April. Leskovac was occupied by the Germans on 12 April 1941. Despite several attempts at assassination and sabotage the town remained relatively docile throughout the Nedić administration, with the exception of the Arapova Dolina massacre of 310 mostly Romani civilians. Pockets of Partisan insurgency remained limited to the surrounding countryside which began experiencing noteworthy military engagements during the July–August 1944 Toplica-Jablanica Operation.

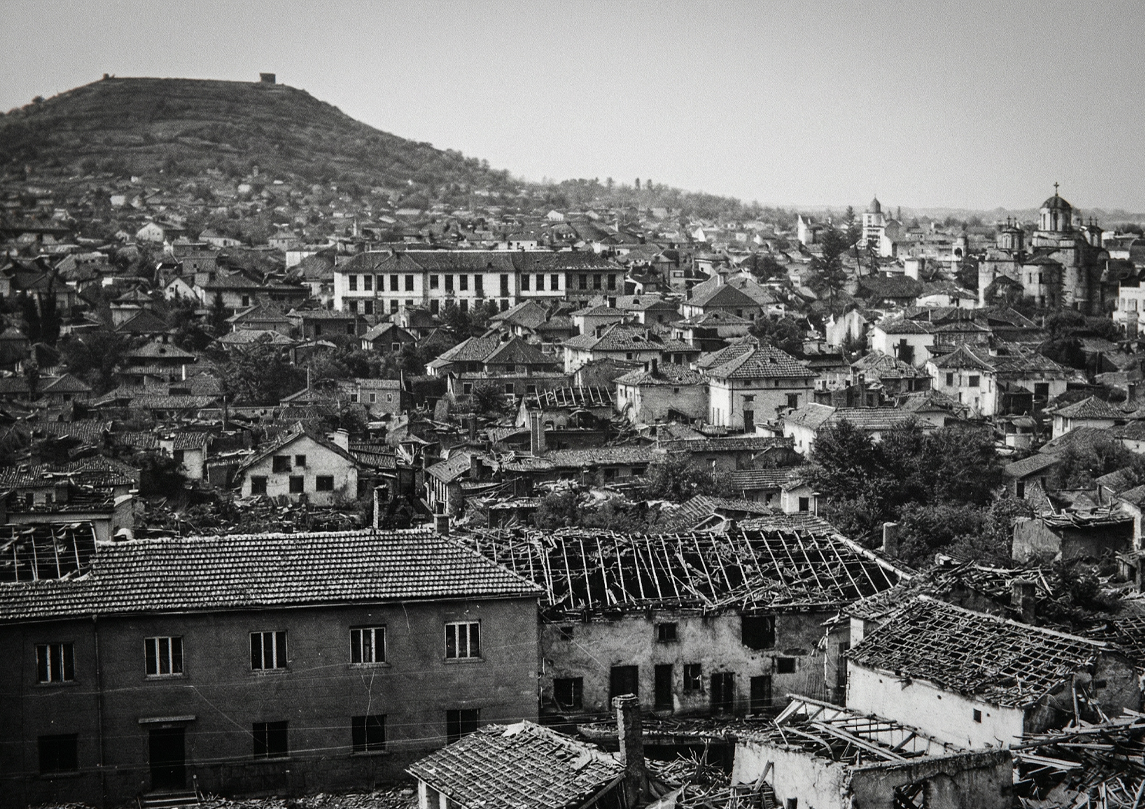
Leskovac following the Allied bombing on 6 September 1944.

An Allied bombing campaign on 6 September 1944 left many hundreds of casualties and much of the town damaged. On 11 October 1944 the Yugoslav Partisans liberated the town and proceeded to purge the town of political and ideological opponents, especially as Leskovac had been an industrial town. Some 707 people were summarily executed in the Leskovac area, out of which 327 were from the town of Leskovac.

The city continued to be a major textile center until the collapse of communism in Eastern Europe, but due to the economic isolation of Serbia resulting from ethnic wars, its remote location, and failure to privatize the mills, the industry collapsed resulting in depression of the economy in the area.

On 12 April 1999, during the NATO bombing of Yugoslavia, a bridge near Leskovac was destroyed by a NATO aircraft as a passenger train was crossing. The act was highly condemned with the bridge being struck twice (the train itself having been bombed from the first attack).

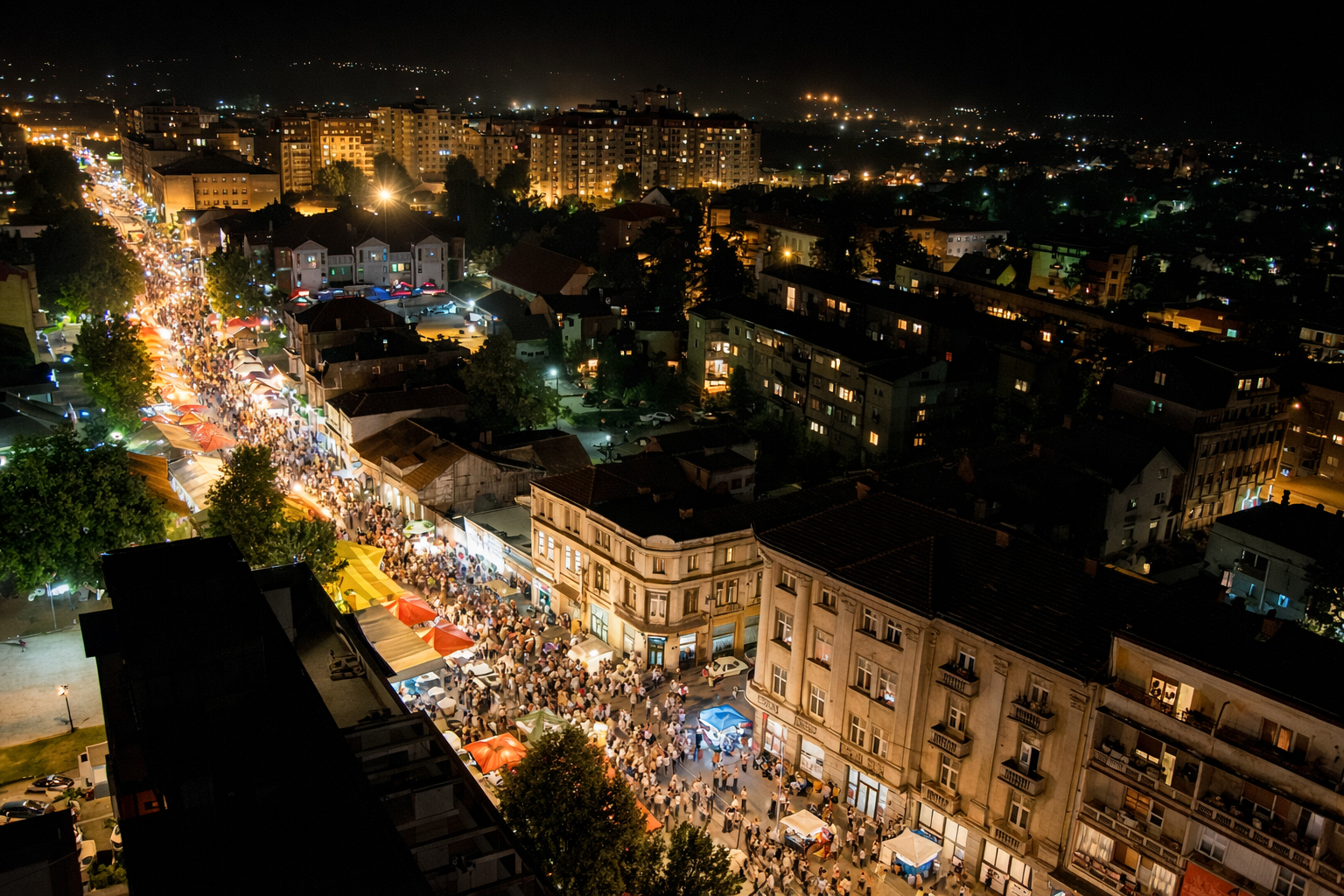
View of Leskovac at night during the Leskovac Grill Fest.

Contemporary Leskovac has become synonymous with Serbian culinary culture, particularly the national dishes of pljeskavica and ćevapi. The annual Roštiljijada grilled meat barbecue festival held since 1989 is the cities biggest tourist attraction drawing in thousands of visitors from both Serbia and abroad.

The once thriving textile industry of Leskovac has all but collapsed with only a small number of businesses still in operation. The effects of globalisation coupled with political sanctions have led to significant economic decline. Local businesses were sluggish in transitioning from a predominantly state capitalist economy towards greater deregulation and privatisation during the 2000s. Despite a modest increase in mostly foreign capital enterprise with some government support, issues of corruption, high unemployment, ageing workforce and community, unreported employment, and population decline still persist.

== Demographics ==
Historical population
Year	Pop.	±%
1948	20,913	—
1953	24,553	+17.4%
1961	34,396	+40.1%
1971	45,478	+32.2%
1981	56,110	+23.4%
1991	62,053	+10.6%
2002	63,185	+1.8%
2011	60,288	−4.6%
2022	54,091	−10.3%

According to the 2022 census, the city (urban) proper had a population of 58,338, while the municipality had a population of 123,950. Serbs were the majority in both the city and municipality, with a significant Romani minority in the city (4,363) and municipality (6,700). The population in the municipality decreased with 18,330 people in a decade, due to population ageing, internal migration and emigration, and this is generally the case in southeastern Serbia.

== Municipality ==
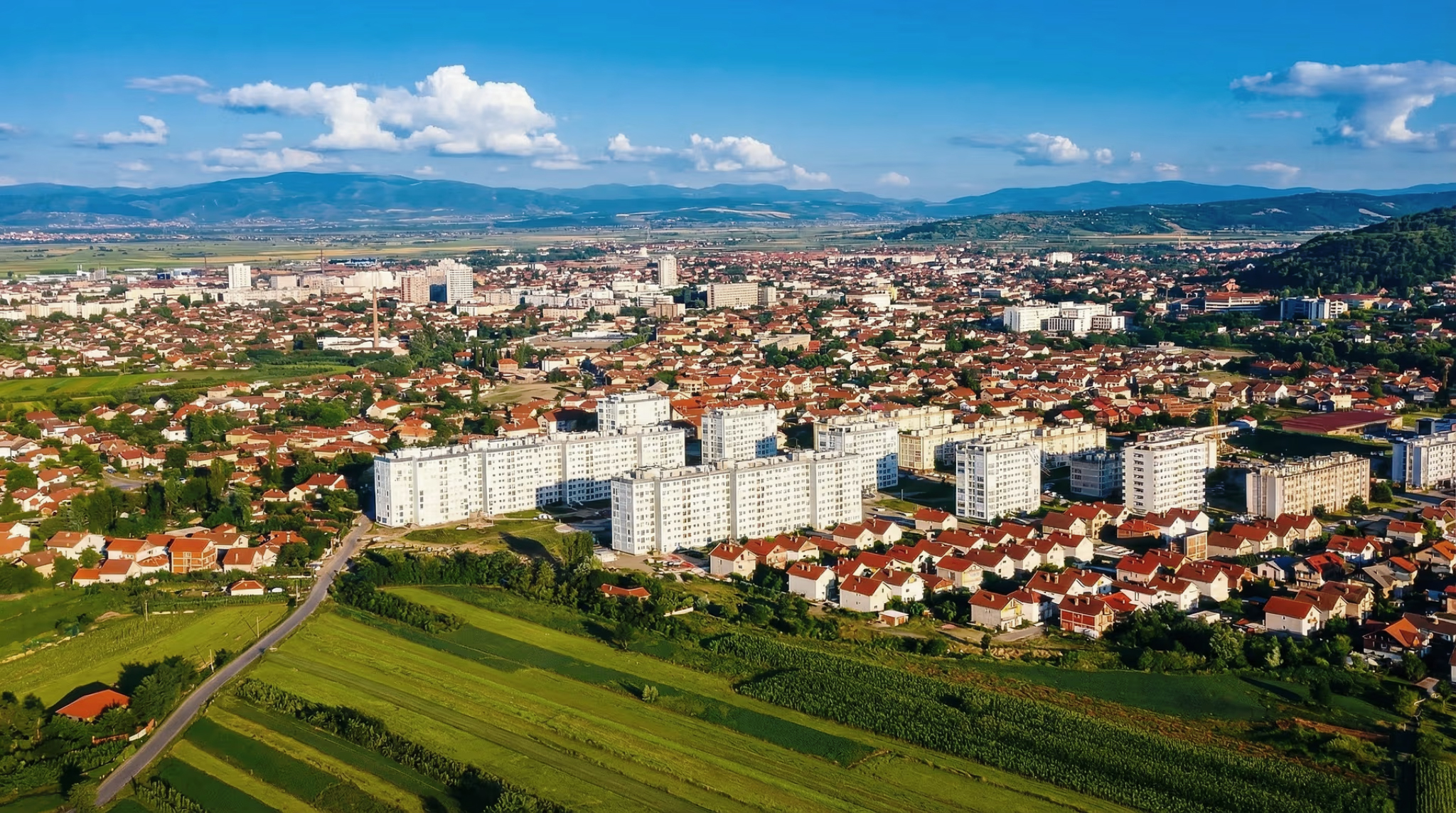
Panoramic view of Leskovac from the air

Apart from the city proper, there are 143 populated places in the city, of which the largest are Vučje and Grdelica, classified as "urban" (town) in census, with about 3000 residents each.

- Babičko
- Badince
- Barje
- Belanovce
- Beli Potok
- Bistrica
- Bogojevce
- Bojišina
- Boćevica
- Bratmilovce
- Brejanovce
- Brestovac
- Brza
- Bričevlje
- Bukova Glava
- Bunuški Čifluk
- Velika Biljanica
- Velika Grabovnica
- Velika Kopašnica
- Velika Sejanica
- Veliko Trnjane
- Vilje Kolo
- Vina
- Vinarce
- Vlase
- Vučje
- Gagince
- Golema Njiva
- Gorina
- Gornja Bunuša
- Gornja Jajina
- Gornja Kupinovica
- Gornja Lokošnica
- Gornja Slatina
- Gornje Krajince
- Gornje Sinkovce
- Gornje Stopanje
- Gornje Trnjane
- Gornji Bunibrod
- Gradašnica
- Grajevce
- Graovo
- Grdanica
- Grdelica
- Grdelica (village)
- Guberevac
- Dedina Bara
- Dobrotin
- Donja Bunuša
- Donja Jajina
- Donja Kupinovica
- Donja Lokošnica
- Donja Slatina
- Donje Brijanje
- Donje Krajince
- Donje Sinkovce
- Donje Stopanje
- Donje Trnjane
- Donji Bunibrod
- Draškovac
- Drvodelja
- Drćevac
- Dušanovo
- Žabljane
- Živkovo
- Žižavica
- Zagužane
- Zalužnje
- Zlokućane
- Zloćudovo
- Zoljevo
- Igrište
- Jarsenovo
- Jašunja
- Jelašnica
- Kaluđerce
- Karađorđevac
- Kaštavar
- Kovačeva Bara
- Kozare
- Koraćevac
- Krpejce
- Kukulovce
- Kumarevo
- Kutleš
- Leskovac
- Lipovica
- Ličin Dol
- Mala Biljanica
- Mala Grabovnica
- Mala Kopašnica
- Manojlovce
- Međa
- Melovo
- Milanovo
- Miroševce
- Mrkovica
- Mrštane
- Navalin
- Nakrivanj
- Nesvrta
- Novo Selo
- Nomanica
- Oraovica (Grdelica)
- Oraovica (Crkovnica)
- Orašac
- Oruglica
- Padež
- Palikuća
- Palojce
- Petrovac
- Pečenjevce
- Piskupovo
- Podrimce
- Predejane
- Predejane (village)
- Presečina
- Priboj
- Ravni Del
- Radonjica
- Razgojna
- Rajno Polje
- Rudare
- Svirce
- Slavujevce
- Slatina
- Smrdan
- Strojkovce
- Stupnica
- Suševlje
- Todorovce
- Tulovo
- Tupalovce
- Turekovac
- Crveni Breg
- Crkovnica
- Crcavac
- Čekmin
- Čifluk Razgojnski
- Čukljenik
- Šainovac
- Šarlince
- Šišince

== Culture ==
=== National Museum ===
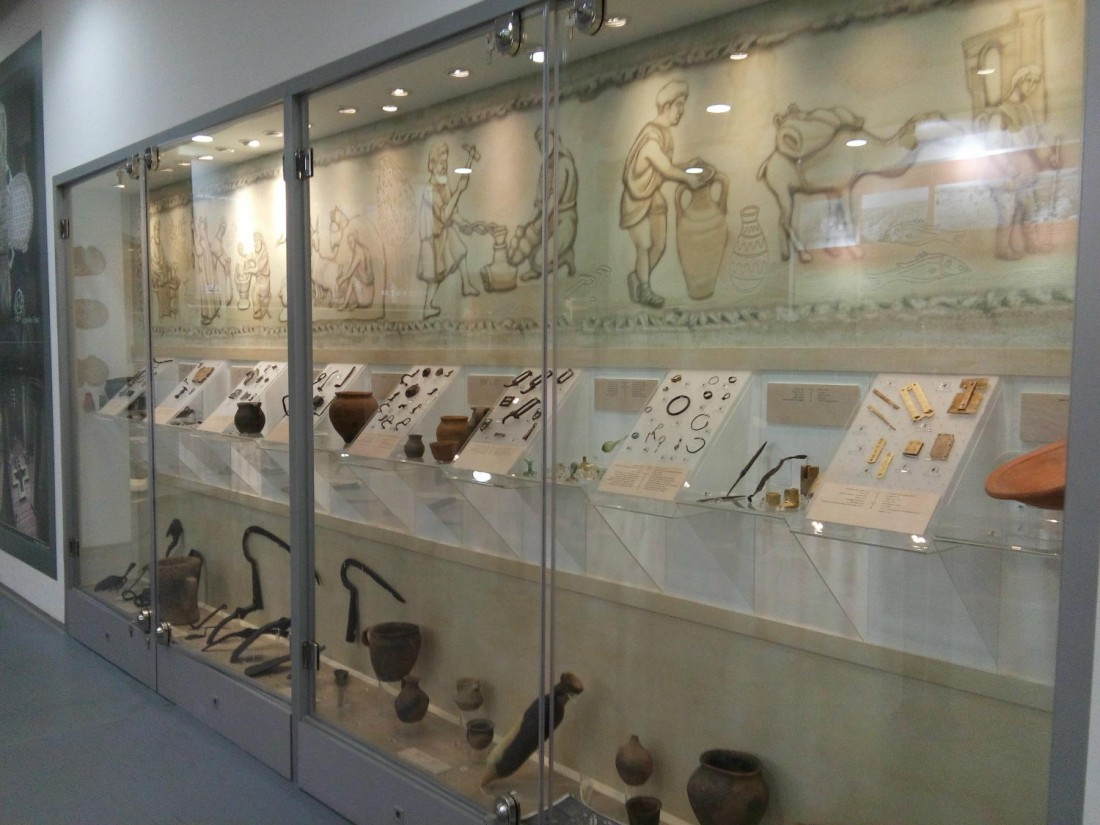
National Museum of Leskovac

The National Museum in Leskovac (Narodni muzej Leskovac) collects and preserves works of archeology, ethnology, history, art history and fine arts collected in the Leskovac region (Leskovac, Bojnik, Lebane and Medveđa) and displays permanent exhibits. It was founded on 2 May 1948, and changed location on 10 May 1974 into a new purpose-built building. Apart from the museum departments of basic sections, and library, it also conserves and restores works, and displays art in two galleries. The museum publishes the annual journal Leskovački zbornik and organizes scientific conferences, lectures and workshops. The conference Cultural and Historical Heritage of South Serbia has been held since 1988.

=== Historical Archive ===
The Historical Archive in Leskovac (Istorijski arhiv Leskovac) was founded on 18 August 1954 as a state archive in the city of Leskovac. After World War II, preserved material was housed at the state archive in Niš. The Historical Archive in Leskovac, under the leadership of educator Velimir Nikolajević, began collecting material in the srez of Leskovac, Vlasotince and Jablanica. By 1957, there were 80 collections, and today, the archive houses over 5,000 books.

=== National Theatre ===
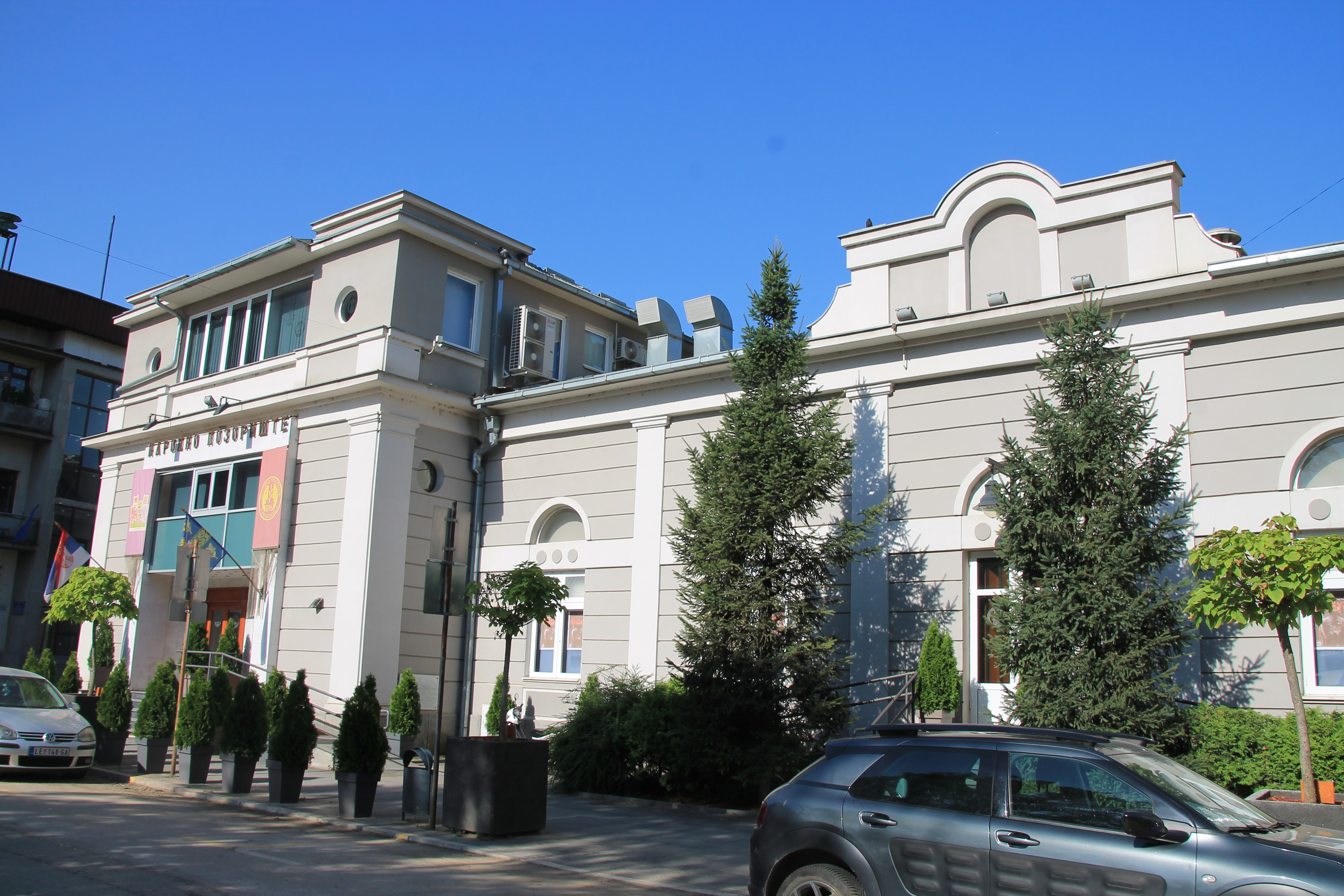
National theatre in Leskovac.

The National Theatre of Leskovac (Narodno pozorište u Leskovcu) was founded in 1896.

=== Cultural Centre ===
The Cultural Centre of Leskovac (Leskovački kulturni centar) was established on 10 October 1981 with the aim of carrying out a wider range of activities in the field of culture. It houses the Leskovac International Film Festival.

=== Events ===
There are several major events held in the town, such as:

- Roštiljijada (also known in English as the Barbecue week) is a grilled meat festival that has been organized in Leskovac for many years and takes place annually at the beginning of September. During the event, the main boulevard is closed for traffic for five days, and food stands are put up along the streets. The event brings visitors from all over Serbia as well as tourists. According to the TOL (Tourism Organization of Leskovac) in 2013, over 700,000 people visited the event. The organisers hold competitions, such as making the biggest burger, the Pljeskavica. The festival is the highlight of the season in Leskovac.
- The Leskovac Carnival is held during the Roštiljijada festival. Around 1200 people take part in the carnival, of which one-third came from abroad. In 2009 Leskovac officially became an International Carnival city, admitted by the Association of European Carnival cities, which has over 50 members from Europe and America.
- The Leskovac Summer is an annual cultural festival.
- The Theater Marathon takes place every year in November and lasts 9 days, at the Leskovac national theatre. It runs performances of National Theaters from all over Serbia.
- Leskovac International Film Festival, established in 2008.

=== Cultural heritage ===
Leskovac has a strong religious identity rooted in Orthodox Christianity, which shapes local traditions, holidays, and everyday life. Churches are central to the city's cultural identity, where people gather not only for worship but also for major life events like baptisms, weddings, and religious holidays. Apart from its strong religious heritage, Leskovac also has a rich cultural life reflected in its monuments, museums, theatre, and other cultural institutions.

Leskovac is home to numerous monuments that reflect its history and identity. One of the most important sites is the Hisar Hill Memorial Park to the Revolution (1971) by famed Yugoslav architect Bogdan Bogdanović. There is also the Monument to the Liberators, honoring those who fought in the wars for Serbian independence in World War I.

Churches in the municipality

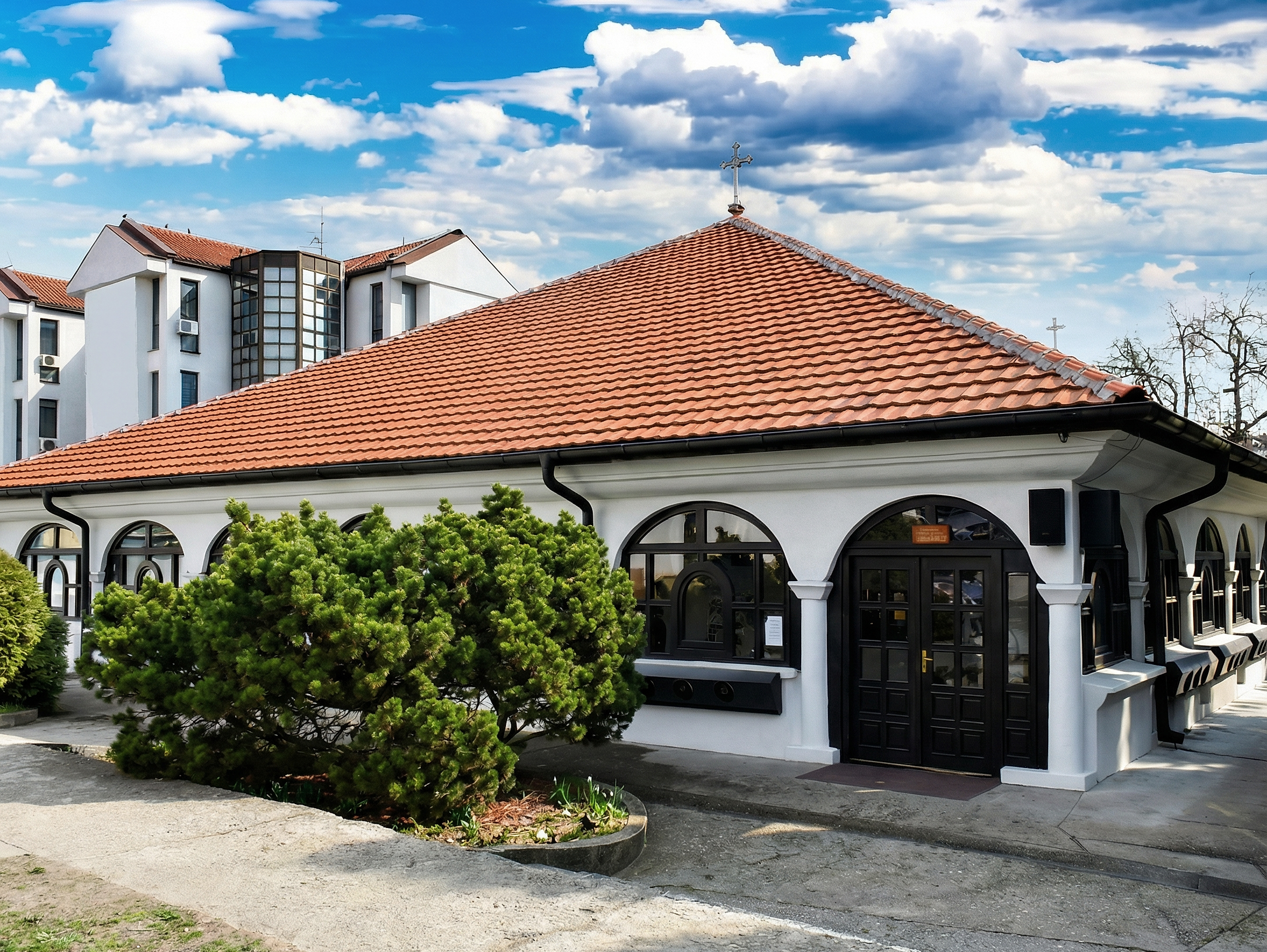
Odžaklija Church in Leskovac

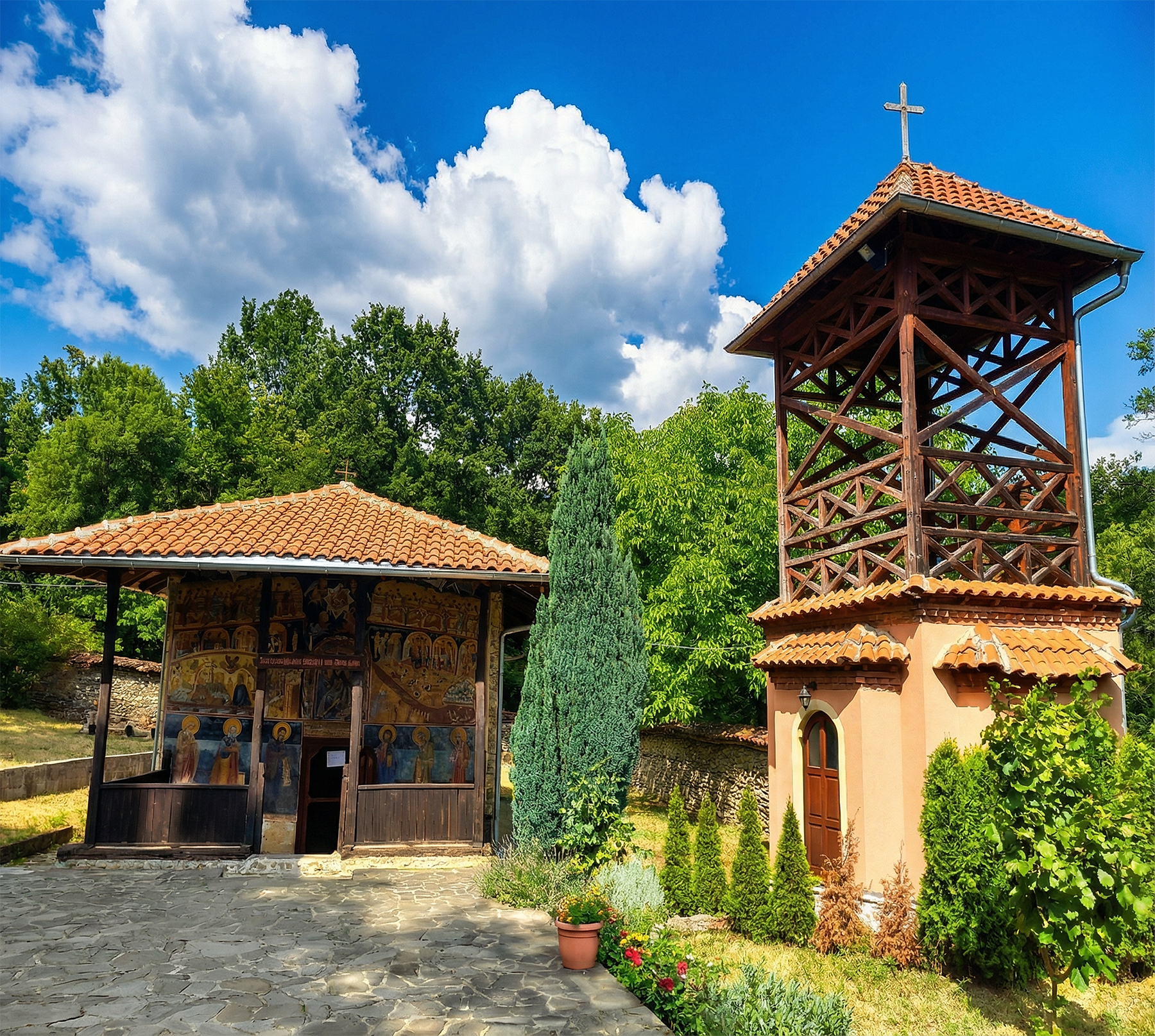
Monastery of St. John, Jašunja

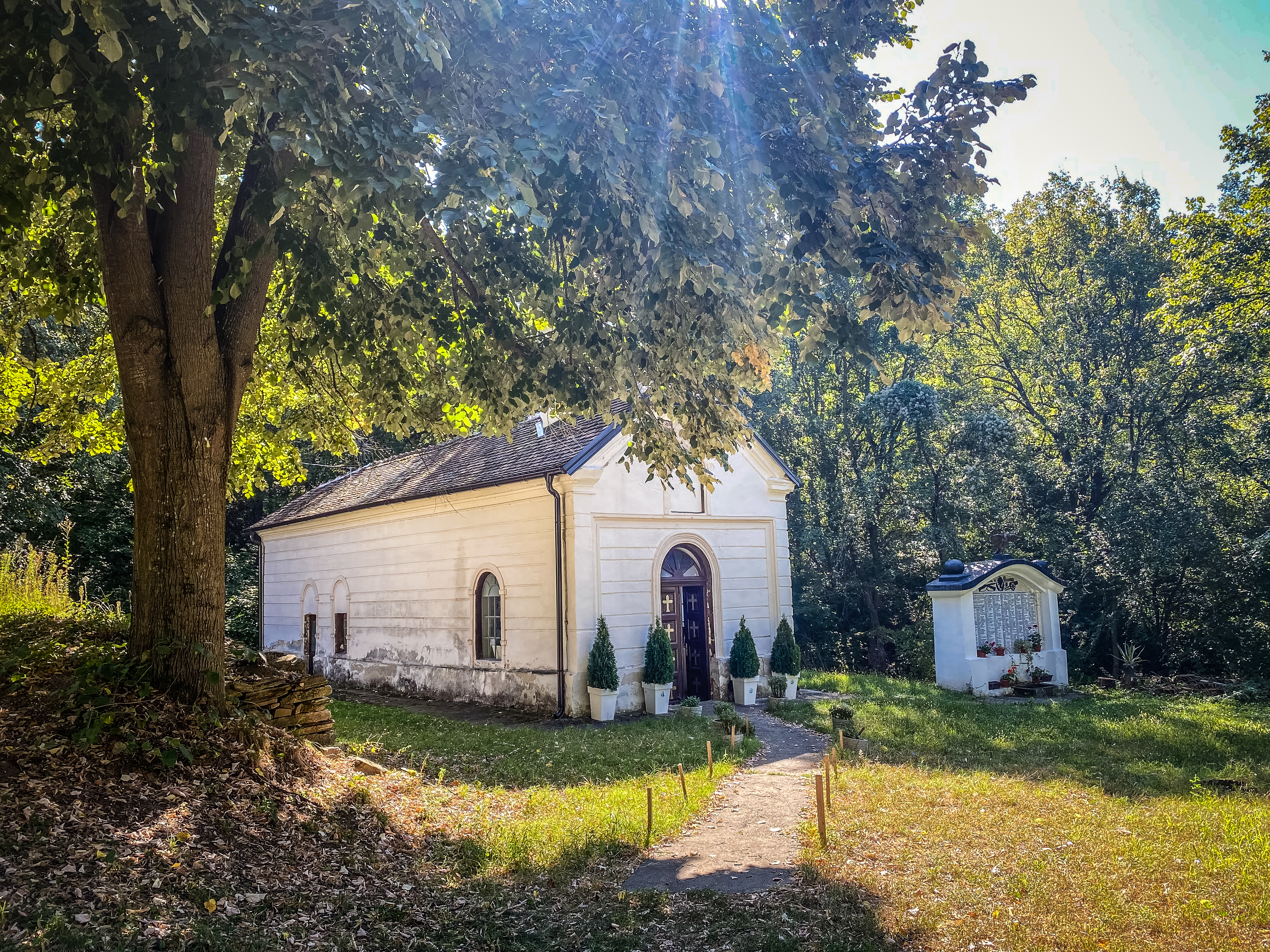
Babičko Monastery

=== Sports ===
Football is by far the most popular sport in Leskovac. The main club, including football clubs GFK Dubočica and FK Sloga Leskovac, represents the city in Serbian competitions and has a loyal local fan base. Matches are played at the modern Dubočica Stadium, which has become a symbol of the city’s sports development. The stadium also hosts national team games and other events, bringing wider attention to Leskovac.

Basketball is another important sport, with clubs like basketball team KK Zdravlje competing at a national level. Indoor sports halls in the city are often full of young athletes training in basketball, volleyball, and handball handball team RK Dubočica 54.. These sports are especially popular among students and contribute to a strong youth sports culture.

Leskovac also supports a variety of individual sports such as athletics, tennis, and martial arts. Local clubs regularly train young competitors, some of whom go on to represent the region at national and international competitions. Parks and recreational areas in the city are often used for running and fitness activities, making sport accessible to everyone.

== Economy and infrastructure ==
Economy of Leskovac is diverse, but it is still somewhat stagnating as a city in whole. Overall, industry has a minor growth, but its growth is safe and in the future, industry will certainly face another growth that will increase its status among Serbia's largest cities. Its main industry is light industry such as textile, household commodities and medical industries. Leskovac has mine of lead and zinc called "Leskovac Lece".

The first boom occurred after WW1 and lasted until 1941. It was "succeeded" in the late 1940s. During so called "Yugoslav economic miracle" (1950s – c.1980) Leskovac has developed into not just regional, but textile center in entire Southeast Europe. It became known as "Serbian Manchester". Leskovac Lece was constructed during that era. During the NATO bombing of Yugoslavia, Leskovac was severely damaged like no other city in Europe at the time.

Core activities

The following table gives a preview of total number of registered people employed in legal entities per their core activity (as of 2022):

Activity	Total
Agriculture, forestry and fishing	279
Mining and quarrying	18
Manufacturing	15,090
Electricity, gas, steam and air conditioning supply	337
Water supply; sewerage, waste management and remediation activities	518
Construction	1,519
Wholesale and retail trade, repair of motor vehicles and motorcycles	5,577
Transportation and storage	1,256
Accommodation and food services	1,067
Information and communication	370
Financial and insurance activities	347
Real estate activities	105
Professional, scientific and technical activities	1,057
Administrative and support service activities	364
Public administration and defense; compulsory social security	1,506
Education	2,481
Human health and social work activities	2,853
Arts, entertainment and recreation	442
Other service activities	517
Individual agricultural workers	1,201
Total	36,906

=== Transportation ===
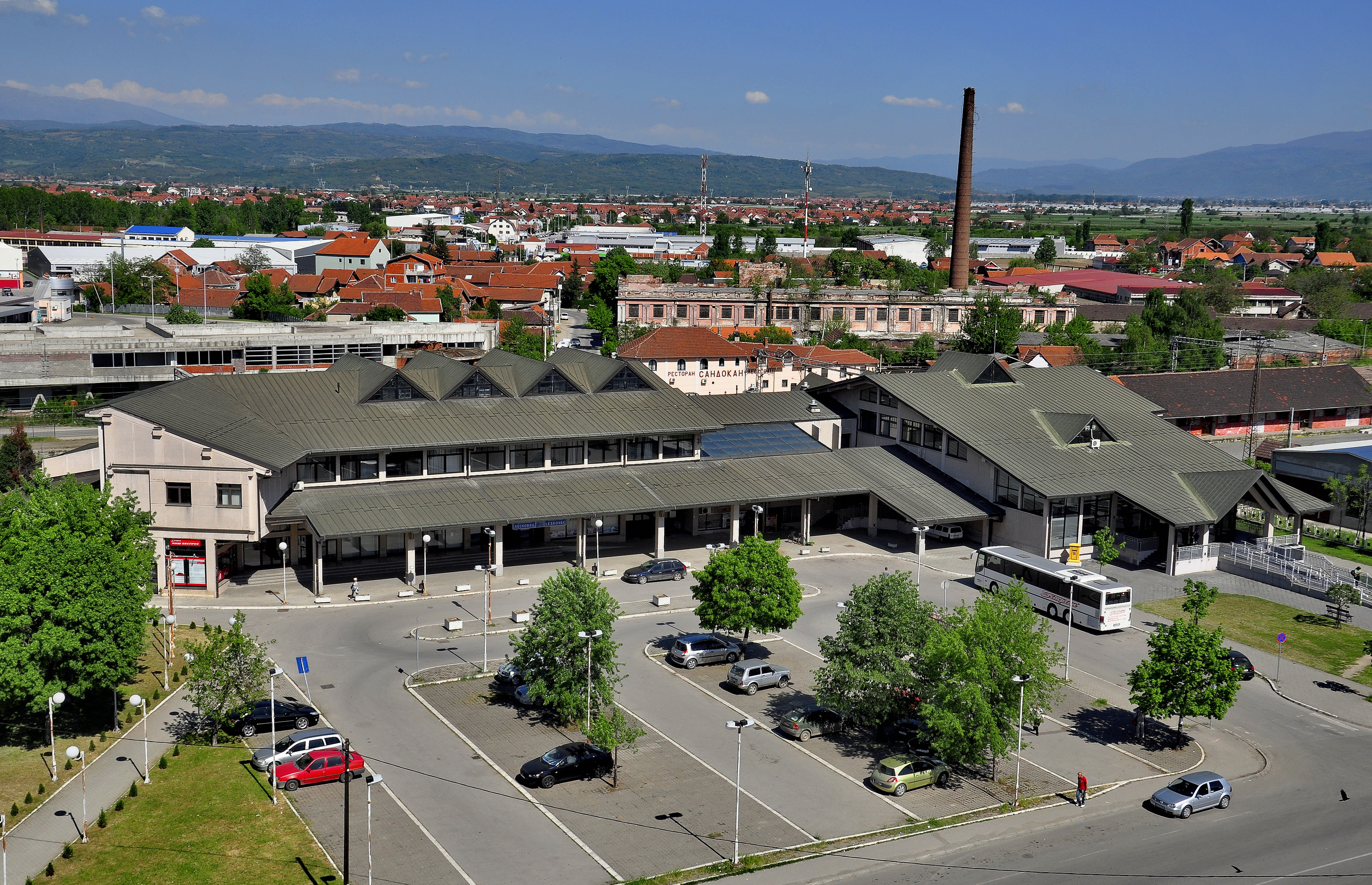
Leskovac Main Railway Station

Leskovac is a traffic junction. International trains traveling from Europe to Skopje, Thessaloniki and Athens pass through this city. Nineteen trains stop in Leskovac every day. The railway came to Leskovac in 1886. Leskovac today has one of the newest and most modern railway stations in Serbia.

Bus traffic is also very well developed, bearing in mind that Leskovac has been criss-crossed with roads. The most important is the E75 road which connects the borders of Hungary and Macedonia. Regional roads lead from Leskovac to Priština, Pirot and Bosilegrad. The distance from Leskovac to Niš is 45, to Belgrade 280, and to Sofia 155 kilometres (96 miles).

Leskovac has a regional airport, which is commonly used for sporting and agricultural flights. Also in summer the airport is used for air taxi. The nearest international airport is Niš Constantine the Great Airport located 45 km (28 mi) north of the city.

=== Environment ===
Leskovac was the first city in Serbia to have a sanitary landfill. Željkovac depot spreads over 80 hectares and is made by all European standards. The landfill contains a center for atmospheric water purification, center for the selection and disposal systems for the detection of all types of pollution. The company Porr Werner & Weber for Serbia, began construction of the center for collecting and recycling waste, and is the first city in the Balkans, where starting this job.

== Notable residents ==
- Ahmed Ademović (1873–1965), trumpeter and distinguished soldier.
- Obrad Belošević (1928–1986), basketball referee.
- Žak Konfino (1892–1975), physician and writer.
- Nikola Dekleva (1926–2003), doctor.
- Vlada Ilić (1882–1952) - industrialist and politician.
- Sloboda Mićalović (b. 1981), actress.
- Gojko Mitić (b. 1940), actor.
- Vladimir Milošević (b. 1980), pianist.
- Jovan Naumović (1879–1945), general
- Nikola Skobaljić (1430–1454), general.
- Louis (1952–2011), singer.
- Miodrag Stojković (b. 1964), geneticist.
- Ilija Strelja (d. 1825), rebel commander.
- Toma Zdravković (1938–1991), acclaimed singer and songwriter.
- Bratislav Živković (b. 1970), footballer.
- Dragi Stamenković (1920–2004), Yugoslav politician.

== See also ==
- List of twin towns and sister cities in Serbia#L
- Leskovac Airport
- Historical Archive of Leskovac

== Sources ==
- Bulatović, Aleksandar; Jović, Smilja (2009). Лесковац: културна стратиграфија праисторијских локалитета у Лесковачкој регији [Leskovac: Cultural Stratigraphy of Prehistoric Sites in the Leskovac Region]. ISBN 978-86-80093-63-5 – via Academia.edu.
- Cvetković, Srđan (2007). "Репресија на југу Србије" (PDF). Лесковачки зборник. 47: 209–232. ISSN 0459-1070.
- Đorđević, Đurđa (2004). "Борба против Турака за ослобођење Лесковца и околине 1433-1877. године" (PDF). Лесковачки зборник. 44: 7–25. ISSN 0459-1070.
- Stojančević, Vladimir (2002). "Стање цивилизације у Лесковцу у 19. веку" (PDF). Лесковачки зборник. 42: 11–16. ISSN 0459-1070.
- Trajković, Dragoljub (1968). Глубочица: у новијим историографским и другим радовима : критички осврти, прикази и белешке: (1946 – 1966). Библиотека Народног музеја у Лесковцу – via Digitalna Biblioteka Vlasotince.
- Žikić, Miloš (2019). "ЛЕСКОВАЦ И ОКОЛИНА У АПРИЛСКОМ РАТУ". Лесковачки зборник. 59: 291–303. ISSN 0459-1070.
