= Bunuški Čifluk =

- Village
- Location within Serbia
- Coordinates: 42°53′01″N 21°52′51″E
- Country: Serbia
- District: Jablanica District
- Municipality: Leskovac

Population (2002)
  - Total: 505
- Time zone: UTC+1 (CET)
  - Summer (DST): UTC+2 (CEST)

Bunuški Čifluk is a village in the municipality of Leskovac, Serbia. According to the 2002 census, the village has a population of 505 people.
