= Šišince =

- Village
- Location within Serbia
- Coordinates: 42°57′20″N 21°55′04″E
- Country: Serbia
- District: Jablanica District
- Municipality: Leskovac

Population (2002)
  - Total: 639
- Time zone: UTC+1 (CET)
  - Summer (DST): UTC+2 (CEST)

Šišince is a village in the municipality of Leskovac, Serbia. According to the 2011 census, the village has a population of 603 people.
