= Mala Biljanica =

- Village
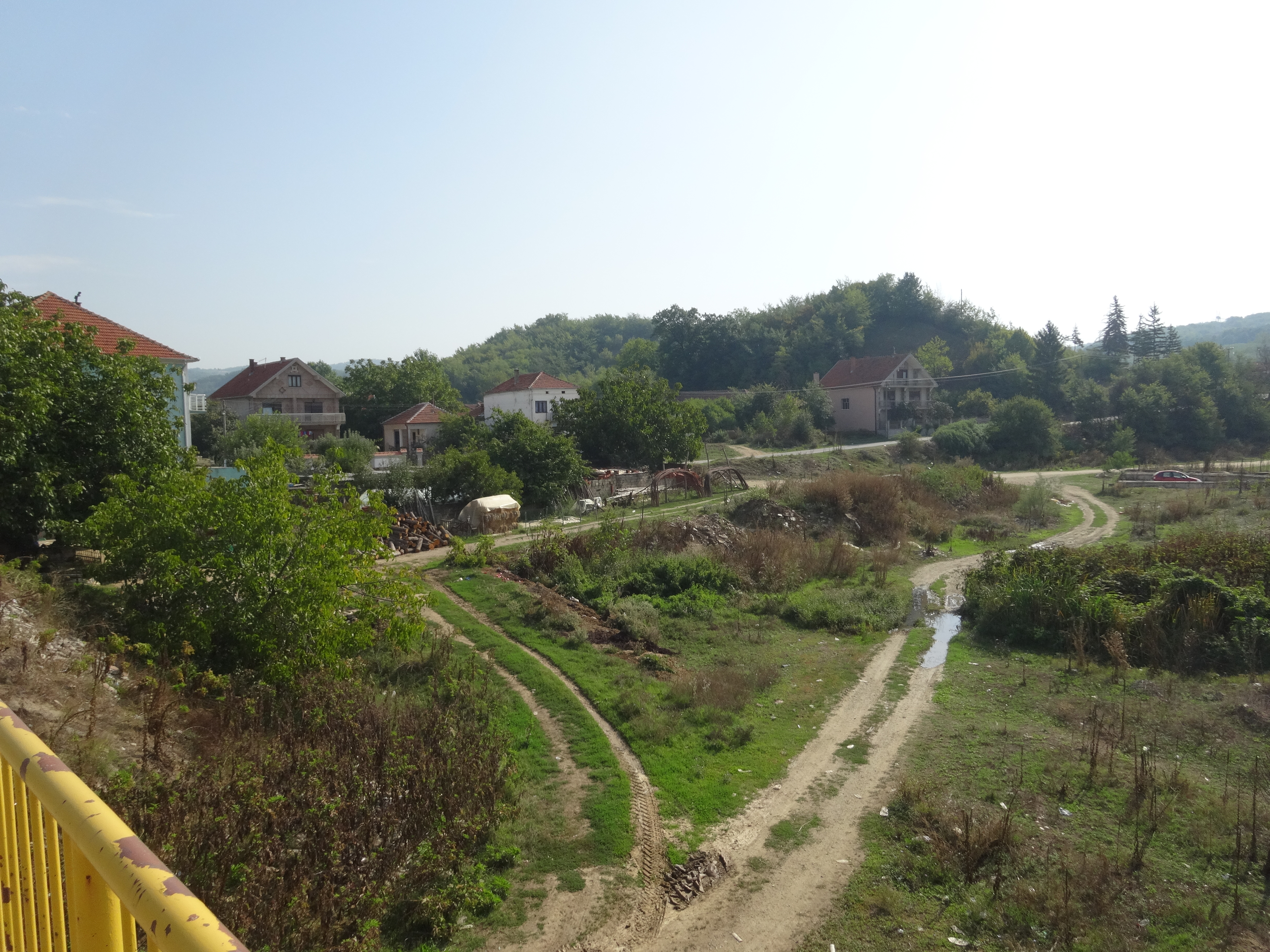

- Location within Serbia
- Coordinates: 43°01′19″N 21°59′57″E
- Country: Serbia
- District: Jablanica District
- Municipality: Leskovac

Population (2002)
  - Total: 207
- Time zone: UTC+1 (CET)
  - Summer (DST): UTC+2 (CEST)

Mala Biljanica is a village in the municipality of Leskovac, Serbia. According to the 2002 census, the village has a population of 207 people.
