= Donje Stopanje =

- Village
- Location within Serbia
- Coordinates: 43°01′07″N 21°54′41″E
- Country: Serbia
- District: Jablanica District
- Municipality: Leskovac

Population (2022)
  - Total: 971
- Time zone: UTC+1 (CET)
  - Summer (DST): UTC+2 (CEST)

Donje Stopanje is a village in the municipality of Leskovac, Serbia. According to the 2022 census, the village has a population of 971 people.
