= Slavujevce =

- Village
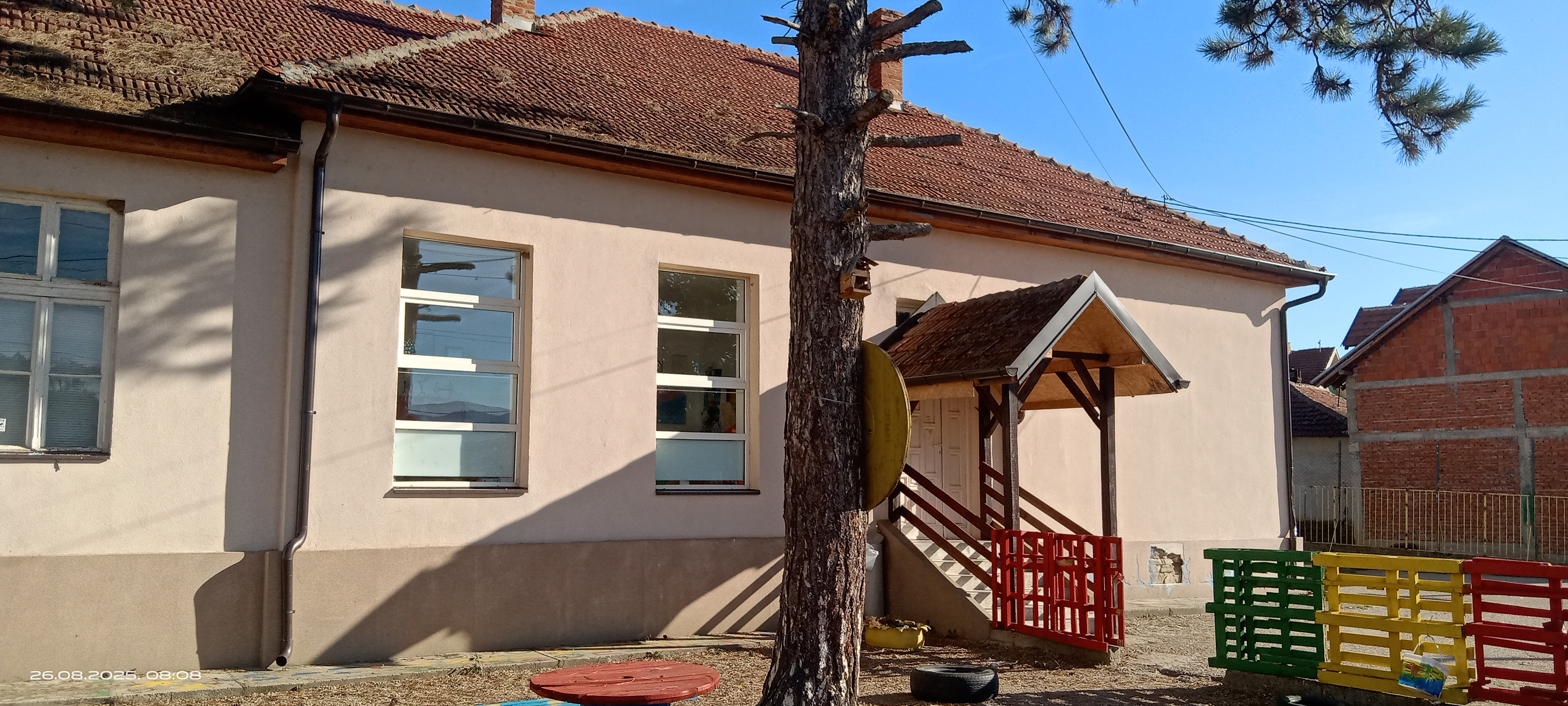
- Primary school in Slavujevce

- Location within Serbia
- Coordinates: 42°53′28″N 21°49′10″E
- Country: Serbia
- District: Jablanica District
- Municipality: Leskovac

Population (2002)
  - Total: 431
- Time zone: UTC+1 (CET)
  - Summer (DST): UTC+2 (CEST)

Slavujevce is a village in the municipality of Leskovac, Serbia. According to the 2002 census, the village has a population of 431 people.
