= Podrimce =

- Village
- Location within Serbia
- Coordinates: 43°03′11″N 21°51′47″E
- Country: Serbia
- District: Jablanica District
- Municipality: Leskovac

Population (2002)
  - Total: 283
- Time zone: UTC+1 (CET)
  - Summer (DST): UTC+2 (CEST)

Podrimce is a village in the municipality of Leskovac, Serbia. According to the 2002 census, the village has a population of 283 people.
