= Jarsenovo =

- Village
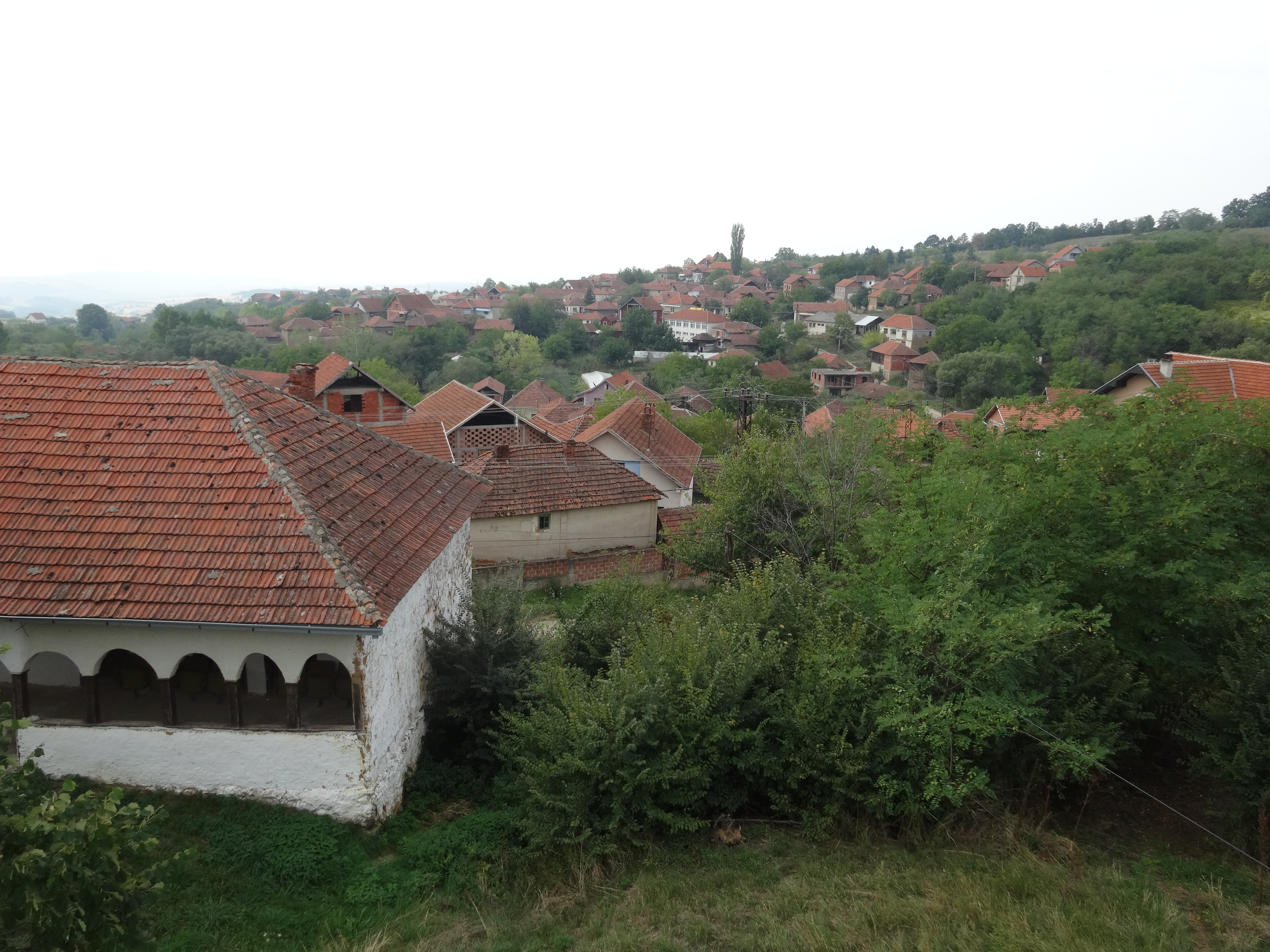

- Location within Serbia
- Coordinates: 43°05′07″N 22°05′10″E
- Country: Serbia
- District: Jablanica District
- Municipality: Leskovac

Population (2002)
  - Total: 428
- Time zone: UTC+1 (CET)
  - Summer (DST): UTC+2 (CEST)

Jarsenovo is a village in the municipality of Leskovac, Serbia. According to the 2002 census, the village had a population of 428 people.
