= Velika Sejanica =

- Village
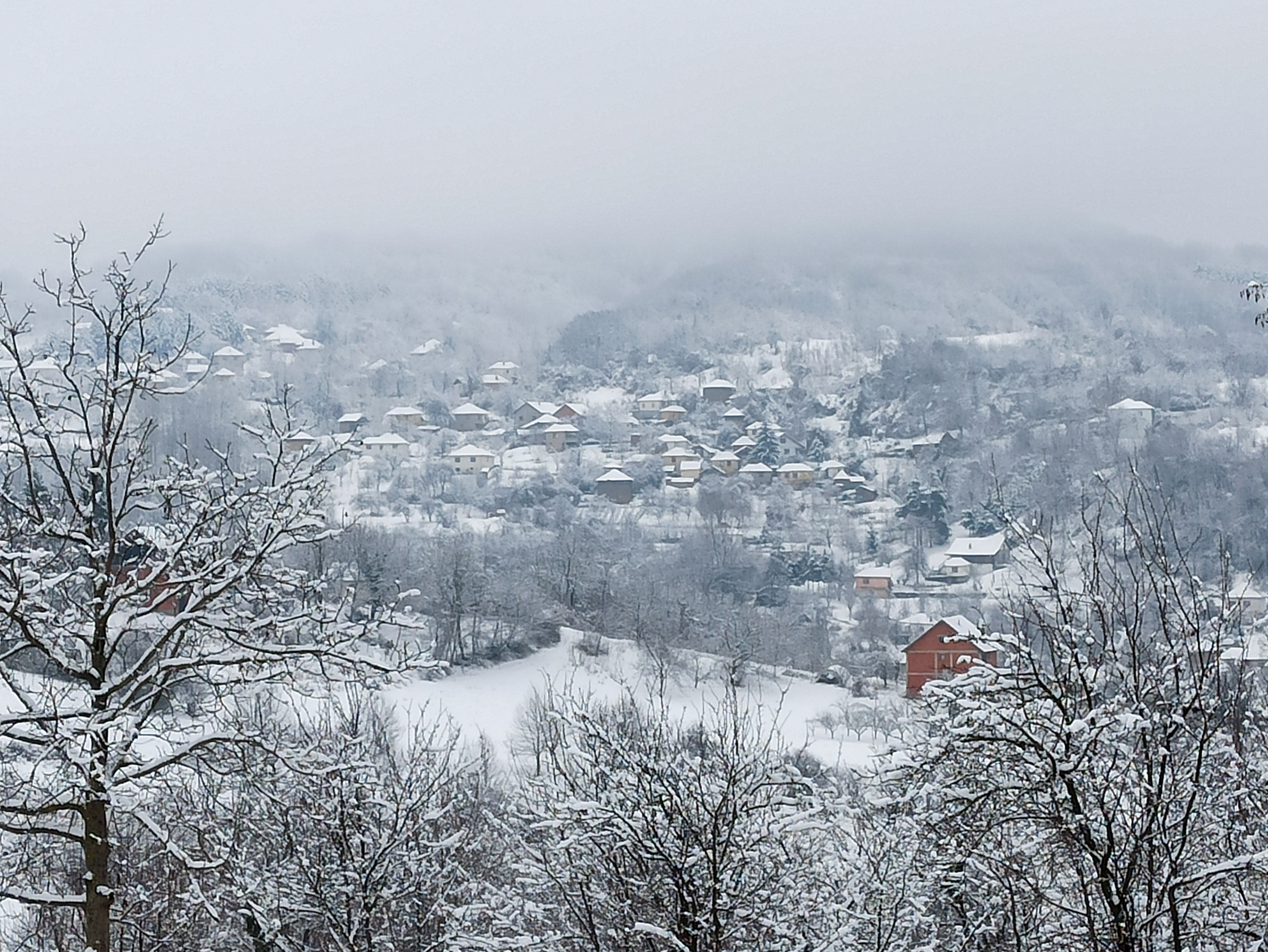
- Velika Sejanica village panorama

- Location within Serbia
- Coordinates: 42°54′29″N 22°06′26″E
- Country: Serbia
- District: Jablanica District
- Municipality: Leskovac

Population (2002)
  - Total: 796
- Time zone: UTC+1 (CET)
  - Summer (DST): UTC+2 (CEST)

Velika Sejanica is a village in the municipality of Leskovac, Serbia. According to the 2002 census, the village has a population of 796 people.
