= Velika Biljanica =

- Village
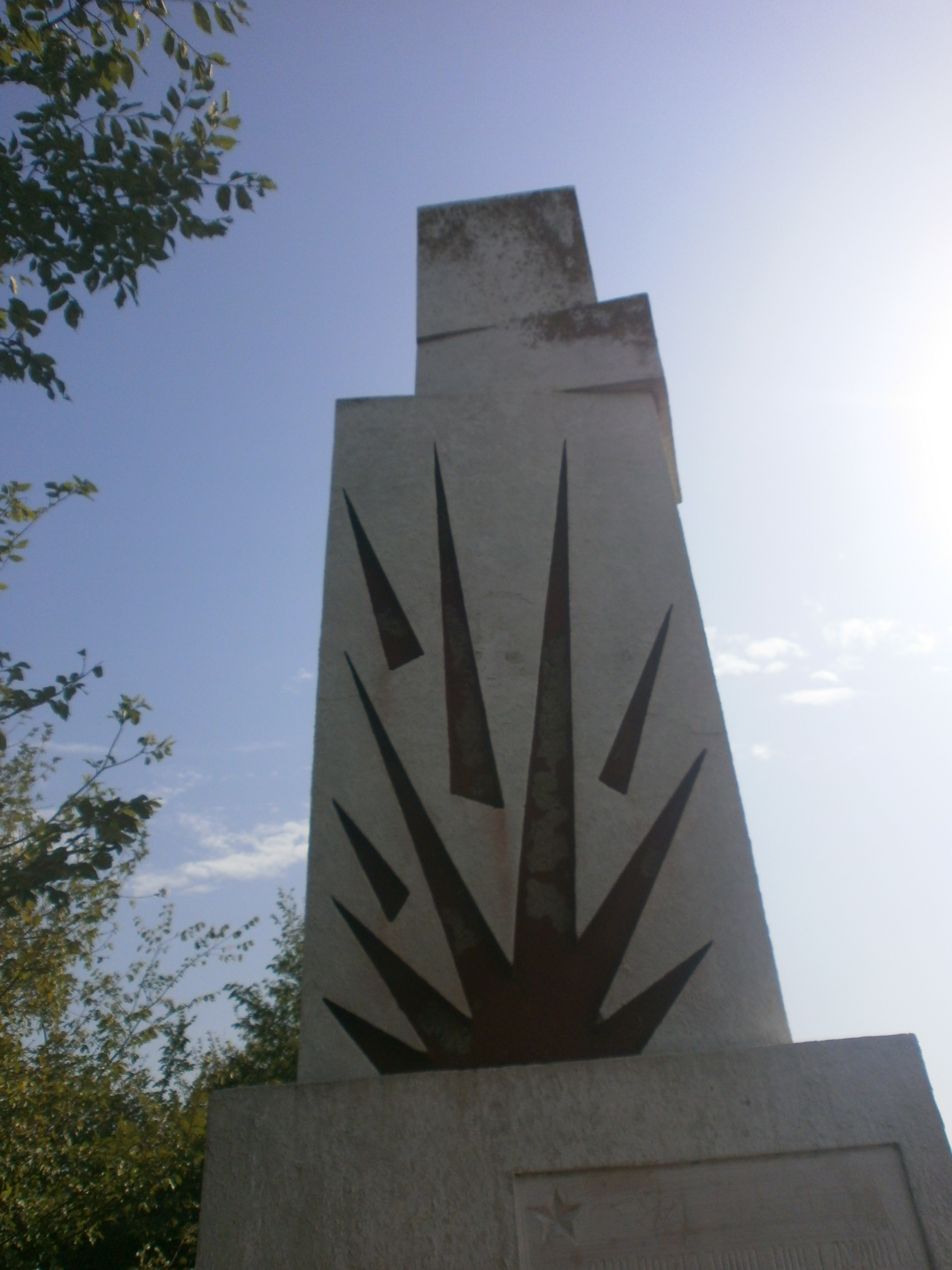

- Location within Serbia
- Coordinates: 43°02′N 22°01′E
- Country: Serbia
- District: Jablanica District
- Municipality: Leskovac
- Elevation: 856 ft (261 m)

Population (2013)
  - Total: 1,152
- Time zone: UTC+1 (CET)
  - Summer (DST): UTC+2 (CEST)

Velika Biljanica is a village in the municipality of Leskovac, Serbia. According to the 2002 census, the village has a population of 516 people.
