= Donja Jajina =

- Village
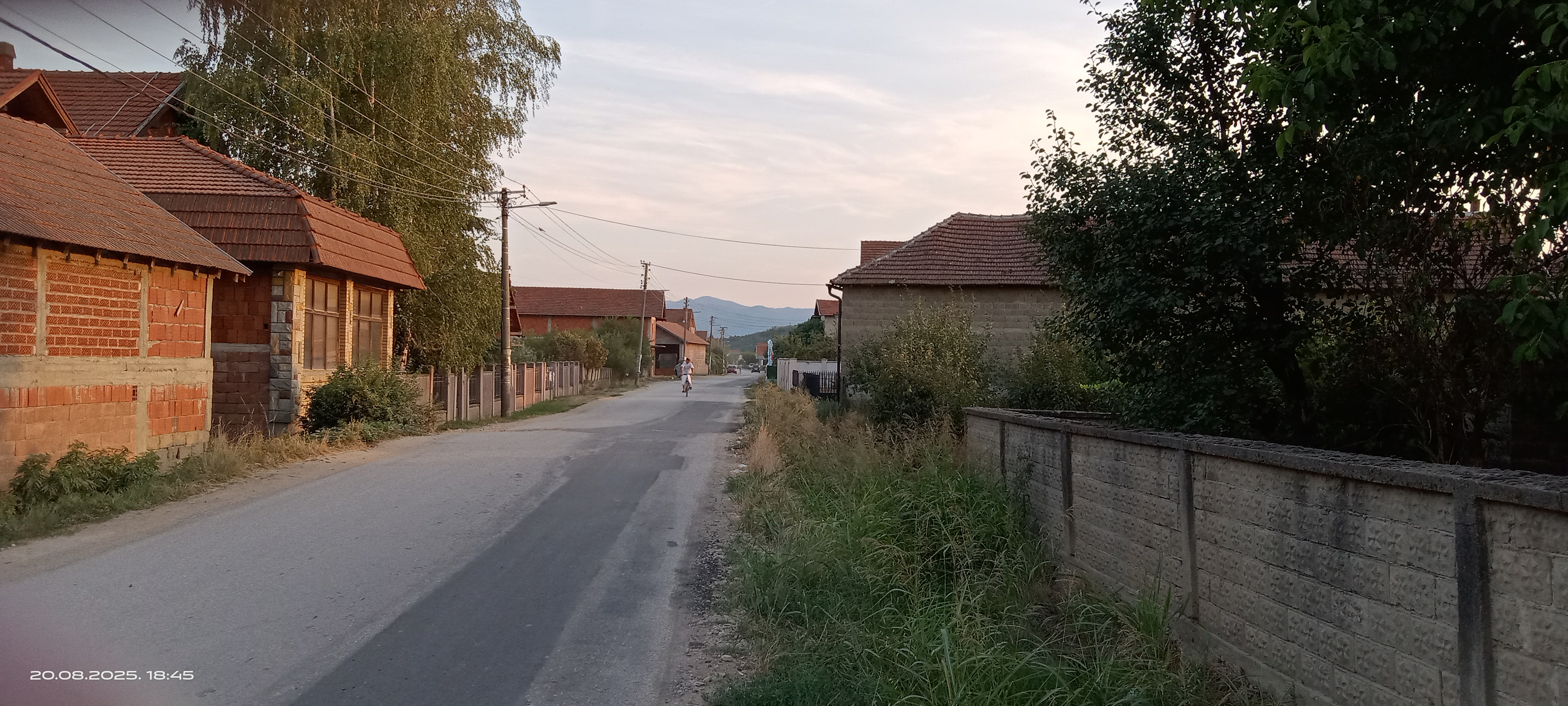
- A road in Donja Jajina in the daytime.

- Location within Serbia
- Coordinates: 42°58′12″N 21°56′32″E
- Country: Serbia
- District: Jablanica District
- Municipality: Leskovac

Population (2002)
  - Total: 1,338
- Time zone: UTC+1 (CET)
  - Summer (DST): UTC+2 (CEST)

Donja Jajina is a village in the municipality of Leskovac, Serbia. According to the 2002 census, the village has a population of 1338 people.
