= Lyaskovets Municipality =

Lyaskovets Municipality Община Лясковец
- Municipality
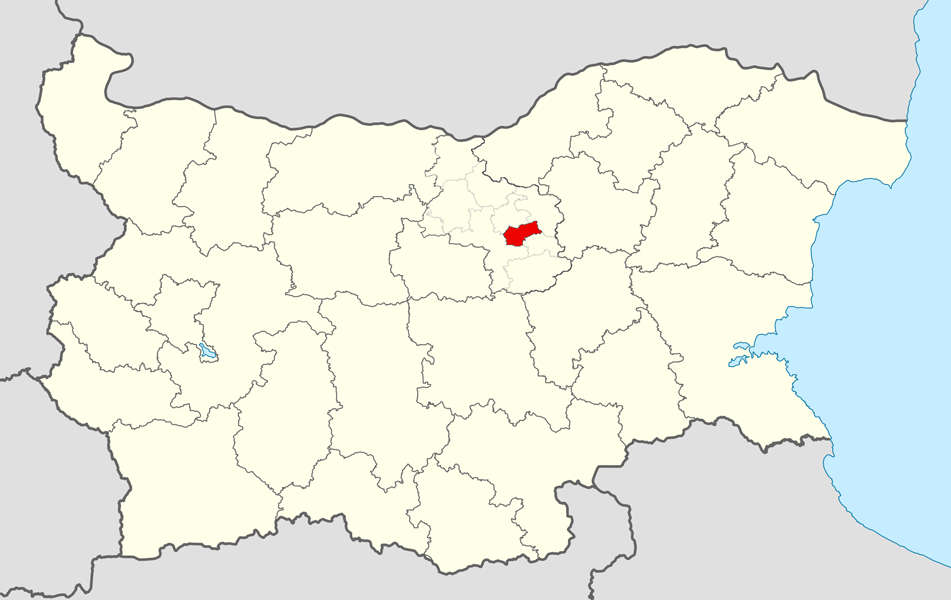
- Lyaskovets Municipality within Bulgaria and Veliko Tarnovo Province.
- Coordinates: 43°6′N 25°45′E
- Country: Bulgaria
- Province (Oblast): Veliko Tarnovo
- Admin. centre (Obshtinski tsentar): Lyaskovets

Area
  - Total: 117.54 km^{2} (45.38 sq mi)

Population (December 2009)
  - Total: 13,677
  - Density: 116.36/km^{2} (301.37/sq mi)
- Time zone: UTC+2 (EET)
  - Summer (DST): UTC+3 (EEST)

Lyaskovets Municipality (Bulgarian: Община Лясковец) is a municipality (obshtina) in Veliko Tarnovo Province, Central-North Bulgaria, located in the transition between the Danubian Plain and the area of the so-called Fore-Balkan. It is named after its administrative centre - the town of Lyaskovets.

The municipality embraces a territory of 117.54 km^{2} (45.38 sq mi) with a population of 13,677 inhabitants, as of December 2009.

The main road E772 crosses the area centrally, connecting the province centre of Veliko Tarnovo with the city of Targovishte and the eastern operating part of Hemus motorway.

== Settlements ==
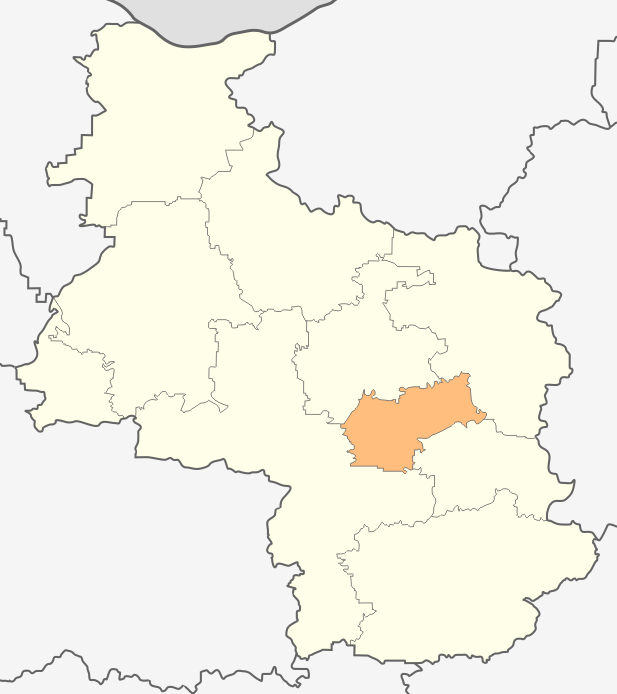
Lyaskovets Municipality within Veliko Tarnovo Province

Lyaskovets Municipality includes the following 6 places (towns are shown in bold):

Town/Village	Cyrillic	Population (December 2009)
**Lyaskovets**	**Лясковец**	8,277
Dobri Dyal	Добри дял	1,168
Dragizhevo	Драгижево	800
Dzhulunitsa	Джулюница	1,900
Kozarevets	Козаревец	915
Merdanya	Мерданя	617
Total		13,677

== Demography ==
The following table shows the change of the population during the last four decades.

Lyaskovets Municipality
**Year**	1975	1985	1992	**2001**	2005	2007	2009	**2011**
**Population**	19,454	18,326	17,479	15,570	14,282	13,915	13,677	...
Sources: Census 2001, Census 2011, „pop-stat.mashke.org“,

=== Religion ===
According to the latest Bulgarian census of 2011, the religious composition, among those who answered the optional question on religious identification, was the following:

Religious composition of Lyaskovets Municipality
Orthodox Christianity	85.9%
Catholicism	0.3%
Protestantism	0.7%
Islam	3.3%
No religion	4.7%
Prefer not to answer, others and indefinable	5.1%

== See also ==
- Provinces of Bulgaria
- Municipalities of Bulgaria
- List of cities and towns in Bulgaria
