= Leskovac (disambiguation) =

Leskovac is a city in southern Serbia.

Leskovac may also refer to:

== Places in Serbia ==
- Leskovac (Zaječar), a village in the Zaječar municipality
- Leskovac (Petrovac), a village in the Petrovac na Mlavi municipality
- Leskovac (Knić), a village in the Knić municipality
- Leskovac (Lazarevac), a village in the Lazarevac municipality

== Places elsewhere ==
- Hrvatski Leskovac, a village near Zagreb, Croatia

== People with the surname ==
- Rachel Leskovac

== See also ==
- Leskovac Airport (disambiguation)
- Leskovec (disambiguation)
- Lyaskovets
