= Leskovo =

Leskovo may refer to the following villages:

- Leskovë, or Leskovo, in Albania
- Leskovo, Demir Hisar, in Demir Hisar Municipality, North Macedonia
- Leskovo, Vologda Oblast, in Russia (for other villages with the name in Russia, Belarus or Ukraine, see ru:Лесково)
- Leskovo (Majdanpek), in Bor District, Serbia

== See also ==
- Lyaskovo (disambiguation)
- Leskova, a village in Raška District, Serbia
- Leskovac (disambiguation)
