= Leskovica =

Leskovica may refer to five villages in south-eastern Europe:

- Leskovica (Aleksandrovac), Serbia
- Leskovica (Babušnica), Serbia
- Leskovica, Gorenja Vas–Poljane, Slovenia
- Leskovica pri Šmartnem, Slovenia
- Leskovica, Štip, North Macedonia

== See also ==
- Lescoviţa, a village in Romania
- Leskovec (disambiguation)
- Leszkowice (disambiguation)
