= Leskovec =

Leskovec may refer to:

== Croatia ==
- Leskovec, Croatia, a village near Štrigova

== Czech Republic ==
- Leskovec nad Moravicí, a village in the Moravian-Silesian Region
- Leskovec (Vsetín District), a village in the Zlín Region

== Slovenia ==
- Leskovec, Celje, a village in the City Municipality of Celje
- Leskovec, Ivančna Gorica, a village in the Municipality of Ivančna Gorica
- Leskovec, Novo Mesto, a village in the City Municipality of Novo Mesto
- Leskovec pri Krškem, a village in the Municipality of Krško

== Kosovo ==
- Leskovec, Kosovo, a village in Prizren Municipality

== See also ==
- Leskovac
- Lyaskovets
- Leskovica
