= Kotoōshū Katsunori =

Sumo wrestler from Bulgaria

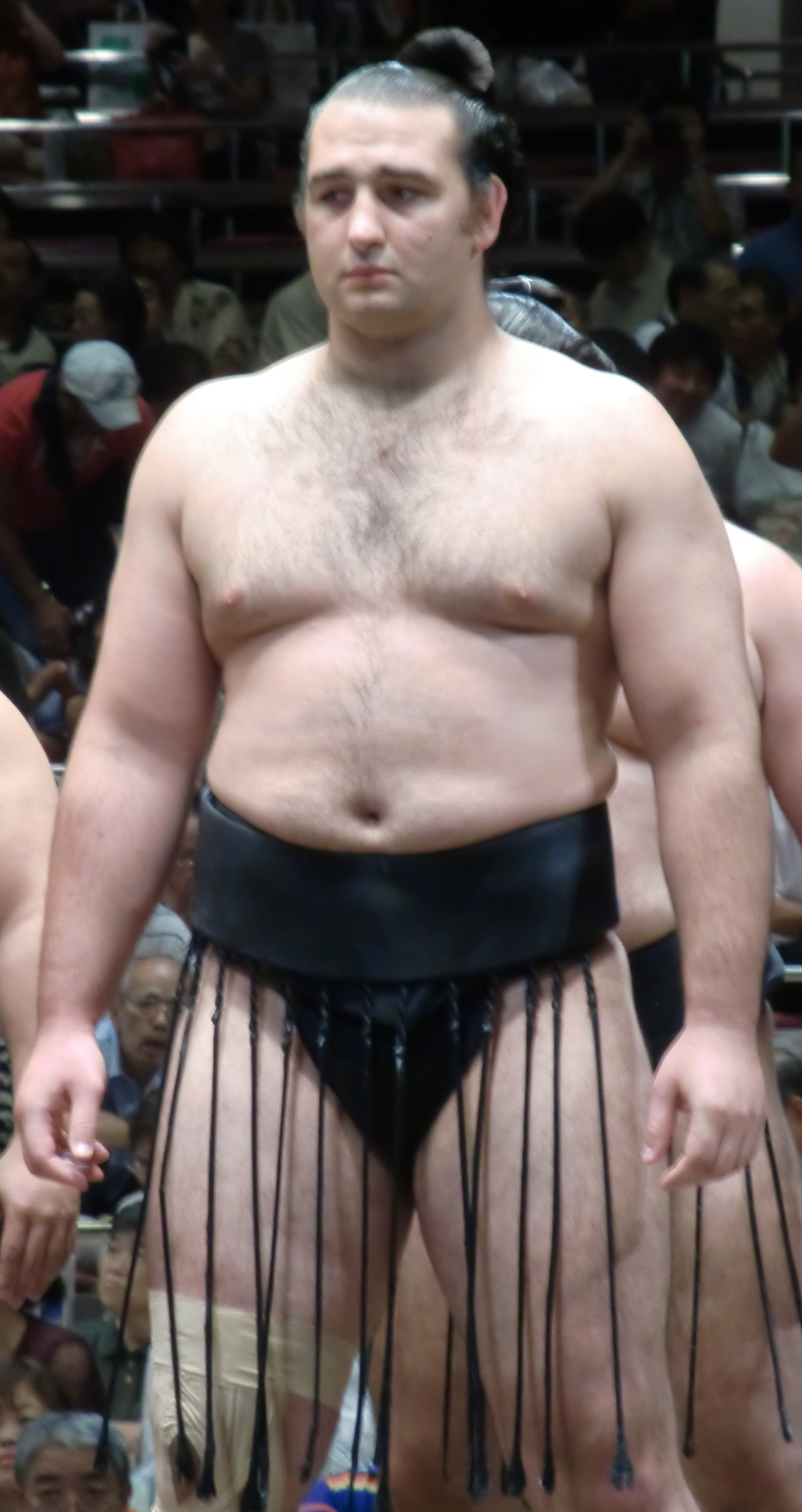
- Katsunori in 2011

Personal information
- Native name: 琴欧洲 勝紀
- Born: Kaloyan Stefanov Mahlyanov; February 19, 1983 (age 43) Dzhulunitsa, Veliko Tarnovo Province, People's Republic of Bulgaria
- Height: 2.03 m (6 ft 8 in)
- Weight: 153 kg (337 lb; 24.1 st)
- Website: https://ameblo.jp/kotooshu-naruto/

Sport
- Sport: Sumo
- Retired: March 2014
- Heya: Sadogatake
- Record: 537–337–63
- Debut: November 2002
- Highest rank: Ōzeki (January 2006)
- Elder name: Naruto
- Championships: 1 (Makuuchi); 1 (Jūryō); 1 (Makushita); 1 (Jonokuchi)
- Special Prizes: Outstanding Performance (2); Fighting Spirit (3)
- Updated on February 9, 2018

Karoyan Andō (Japanese: 安藤 カロヤン, romanized: Andō Karoyan; born Kaloyan Stefanov Mahlyanov, Bulgarian: Калоян Стефанов Махлянов; born 19 February 1983), known professionally as Kotoōshū Katsunori (Japanese: 琴欧洲 勝紀) and in his coaching career as Naruto Katsunori (Japanese: 鳴戸 勝紀), is a Bulgarian-Japanese former sumo wrestler. He made his debut in 2002, reaching the top division just two years later. In 2005, he was the first European sumo wrestler to reach the rank of ōzeki or 'champion', the second-highest level in the sumo ranking system behind only yokozuna. On May 24, 2008, Kotoōshū made history by becoming the first European sumo wrestler to win an Emperor's Cup. He was one of the longest serving ōzeki in sumo history, holding the rank for 47 consecutive tournaments until November 2013.

In January 2014 Kotoōshū obtained Japanese citizenship, a requirement of becoming an elder in the Japan Sumo Association, and he announced his retirement during the following tournament in March. In April 2017 he opened his own training stable, Naruto.

== Early life and sumo background ==
He was born in Dzhulunitsa, Veliko Tarnovo Province. He was originally a Greco-Roman wrestler, coached by his father, and by the age of 14 he had already won a European championship. He was accepted by the Bulgarian National Sports Academy where he majored in wrestling. He hoped to compete for Bulgaria in the 2000 Olympic Games, but as his weight increased beyond the 120 kg upper limit, he switched instead to sumo. He was recruited by Sadogatake stable, whose stablemaster was impressed by his filial duty of sending money home to his parents.

Mahlyanov's professional sumo debut was in November 2002, starting in the lowest-ranked jonokuchi division. He was given the shikona of Kotoōshū, derived from his place of origin — koto, shared by all wrestlers at his stable, and ōshū, meaning Europe. (Following the September 2006 tournament, he changed one of the characters in his ring name, 州 becoming 洲, although the pronunciation, shū, is the same for both.) He posted kachikoshi (winning records in tournaments) throughout his early career, going 71–15 in the five divisions below the makuuchi top division. He reached makuuchi in September 2004, only 11 tournaments after his professional debut, the fastest rise since the introduction of the six tournaments per year system in 1958.

Upon reaching the top division he had kachikoshi winning records for four consecutive tournaments, being promoted to san'yaku at the rank of komusubi before the March 2005 basho (sumo tournament). At the rank of komusubi, he made his first makekoshi (losing tournament) record, and was demoted to maegashira again before returning to the higher rank of komusubi after a strong 10–5 record in May.

== Promotion to ōzeki ==
In the July 2005 tournament Kotoōshū defeated Asashōryū for the first time with an overarm (uwatenage) throw, bringing to an end a run of 24 consecutive bout victories for the yokozuna. He also was the runner up in the tournament, winning an "outstanding performance" sanshō prize.

Kotoōshū was promoted to sekiwake for the following September tournament and won his first twelve bouts, finishing with an exceptional 13–2 runner up record and only losing the tournament victory after a play-off bout with Asashōryū. An 11–4 record in the final (November) tournament of 2005 was his third runner-up performance in a row and included another victory over the otherwise dominant Asashōryū. This led to his promotion to the rank of ōzeki on November 30, 2005. His three-tournament record (on which ōzeki promotions are based) was 36–9. His promotion coincided with the retirement of his stablemaster, former yokozuna Kotozakura.

His promotion to ōzeki took only 19 tournaments from his professional sumo debut. Although he was not the youngest ōzeki ever, this represents the most rapid rise for a wrestler entering sumo from the bottom jonokuchi division, until Ukrainian Aonishiki was promoted to ōzeki in a record 14 tournaments after the November 2025 basho. (Certain experienced amateur wrestlers can be given dispensation to start in the third-highest makushita division.) He is also the first wrestler of European birth to hold the ōzeki rank, and the fifth non-Japanese to have achieved it (following Konishiki, Akebono, and Musashimaru from Hawaii and Asashōryū from Mongolia).

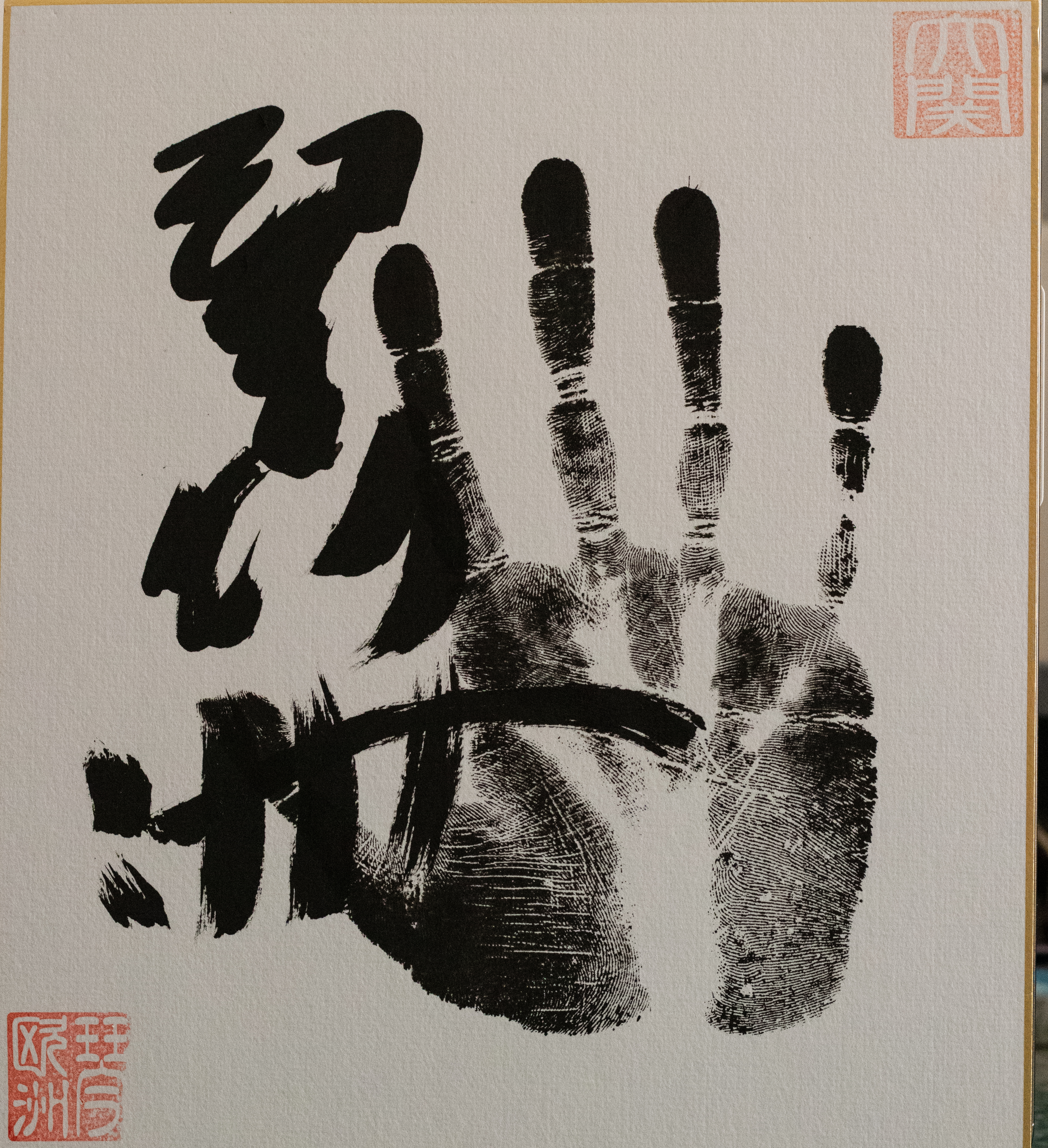
Kotoōshū original tegata (handprint & signature)

== Ōzeki career ==
After his promotion, Kotoōshū was somewhat restricted by a knee injury. He was also criticised for relying too much on the henka technique – jumping to the side at the initial charge. It is not considered to be a move worthy of someone at his high rank.

Kotoōshū managed only three double-figure scores in 2006, and none at all in 2007, only doing enough to maintain his rank. Shortly before the November 2007 tournament he dislocated his right knee in training. Clearly troubled by the injury he pulled out on the 7th day, the first time in his career that he has had to withdraw from a tournament. He preserved his ōzeki rank with a 9–6 score in January 2008. In the Osaka tournament of March 2008 he injured his left arm in a match with Kakuryū on the 4th day and withdrew on Day 9 with only two wins. There was speculation that he would be demoted to sekiwake in the following tournament in May.

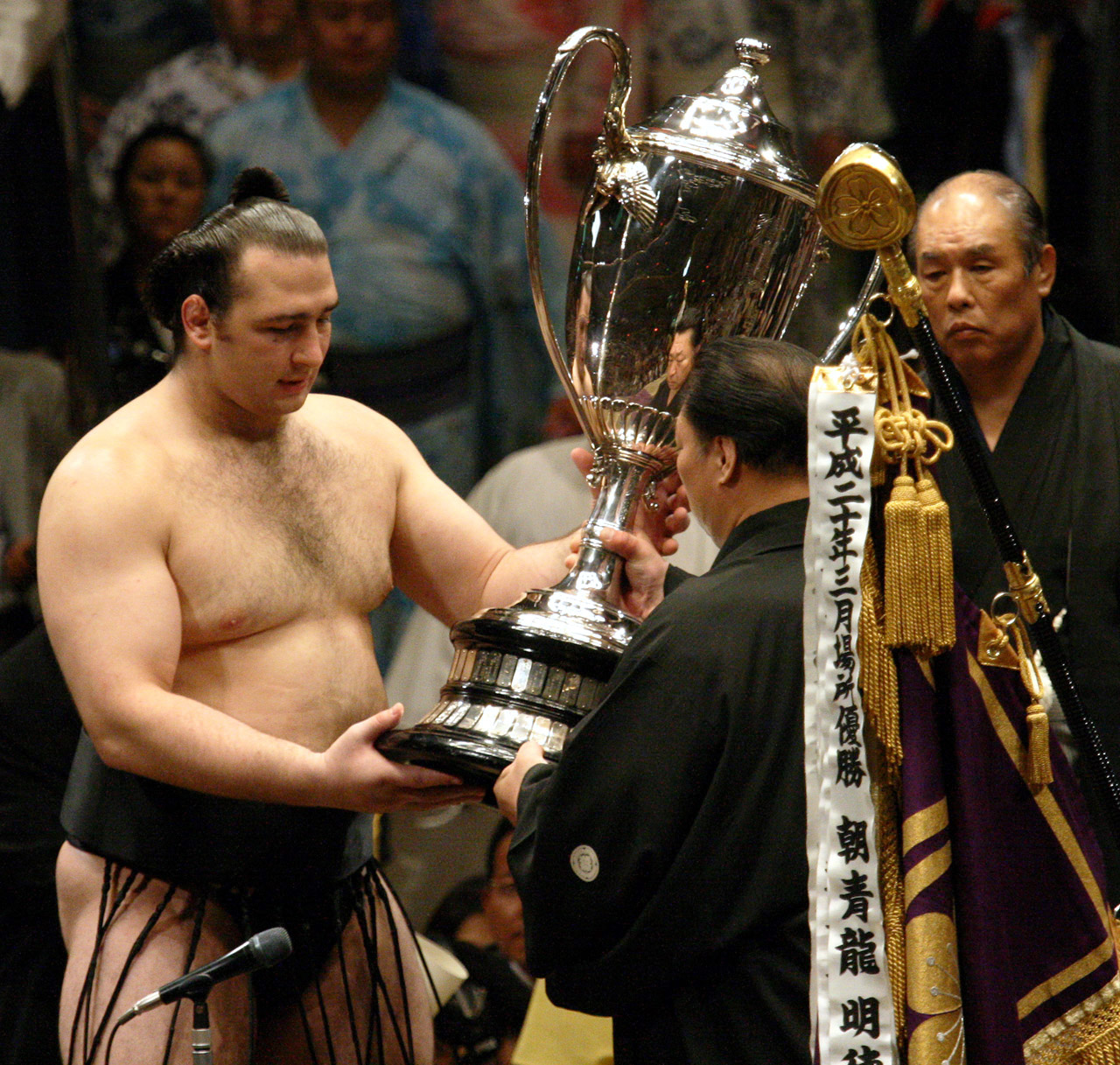
Kotoōshū receives the Emperor's Cup for winning the May 2008 tournament

Needing eight wins to hold his rank in the May 2008 tournament, he won 12 consecutive bouts including dominating victories against yokozuna Asashōryū on the 11th day and yokozuna Hakuhō on the 12th day. He was easily defeated by Aminishiki on the 13th day, but came back strong to defeat Ama on the 14th day, becoming the first European to win a top division championship. His father was in the crowd to witness his victory. He was also congratulated by the Bulgarian President Georgi Parvanov.

Kotoōshū was unable to follow up his victory with a push for yokozuna promotion, producing scores of only 9–6 and 8–7 in the next two tournaments. In October 2008 he denied allegations by disgraced former wrestler Wakanohō that he had thrown matches against Kotoōshū in return for money, saying "I am saddened by this. It is all lies." Wakanohō subsequently retracted his comments. He produced scores of 10–5 in the first two tournaments of 2009, the best record amongst his fellow ōzeki. In the May 2009 tournament, he finished the tournament with a 9–6 score. However, he ended yokozuna Hakuhō's 33-bout winning streak on the 14th day. In July 2009 he was in contention for the yūshō until the final day and finished runner-up with an impressive 13–2 score. He never won more than ten bouts in a tournament after that. He pulled out of the May 2011 tournament on Day 11, citing a knee injury. He returned in July and preserved his rank by securing his eighth win on Day 10 (the last bout of fellow ōzeki Kaiō's career), finishing on 9–6. However he withdrew once again in September after suffering five defeats in the first six days. In the May 2012 tournament Kotoōshū withdrew with an ankle ligament injury on the last day, handing opponent Tochiōzan his twelfth victory by default and eliminating Hakuhō and two maegashira from the yūshō race. The crowd showed their displeasure by booing as his withdrawal was announced. He continued to suffer from injury problems, also withdrawing from the September 2012 as well as the March, September and November 2013 tournaments.

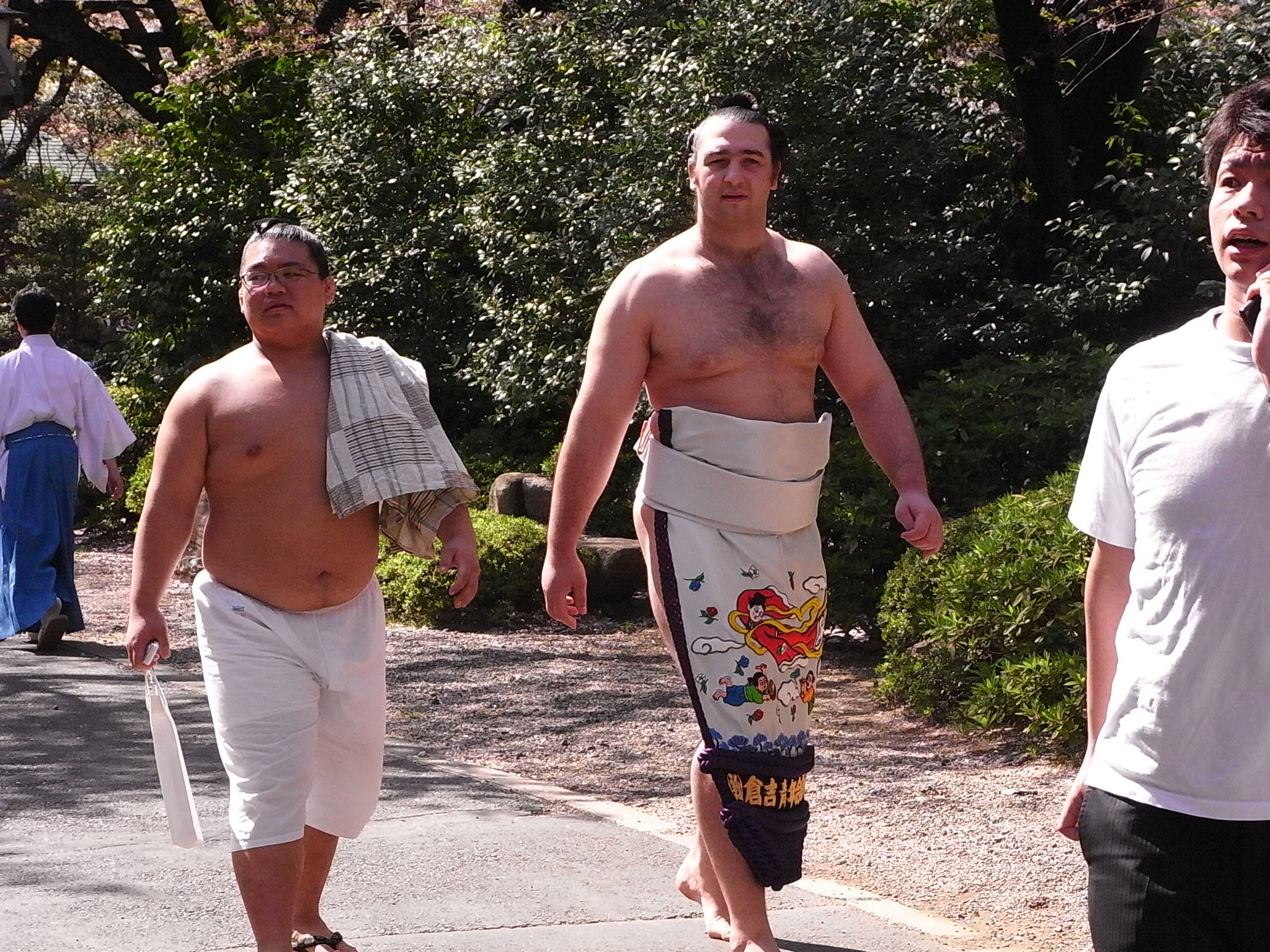
Sumo wrestling at Yasukuni Shrine (April 10, 2009)

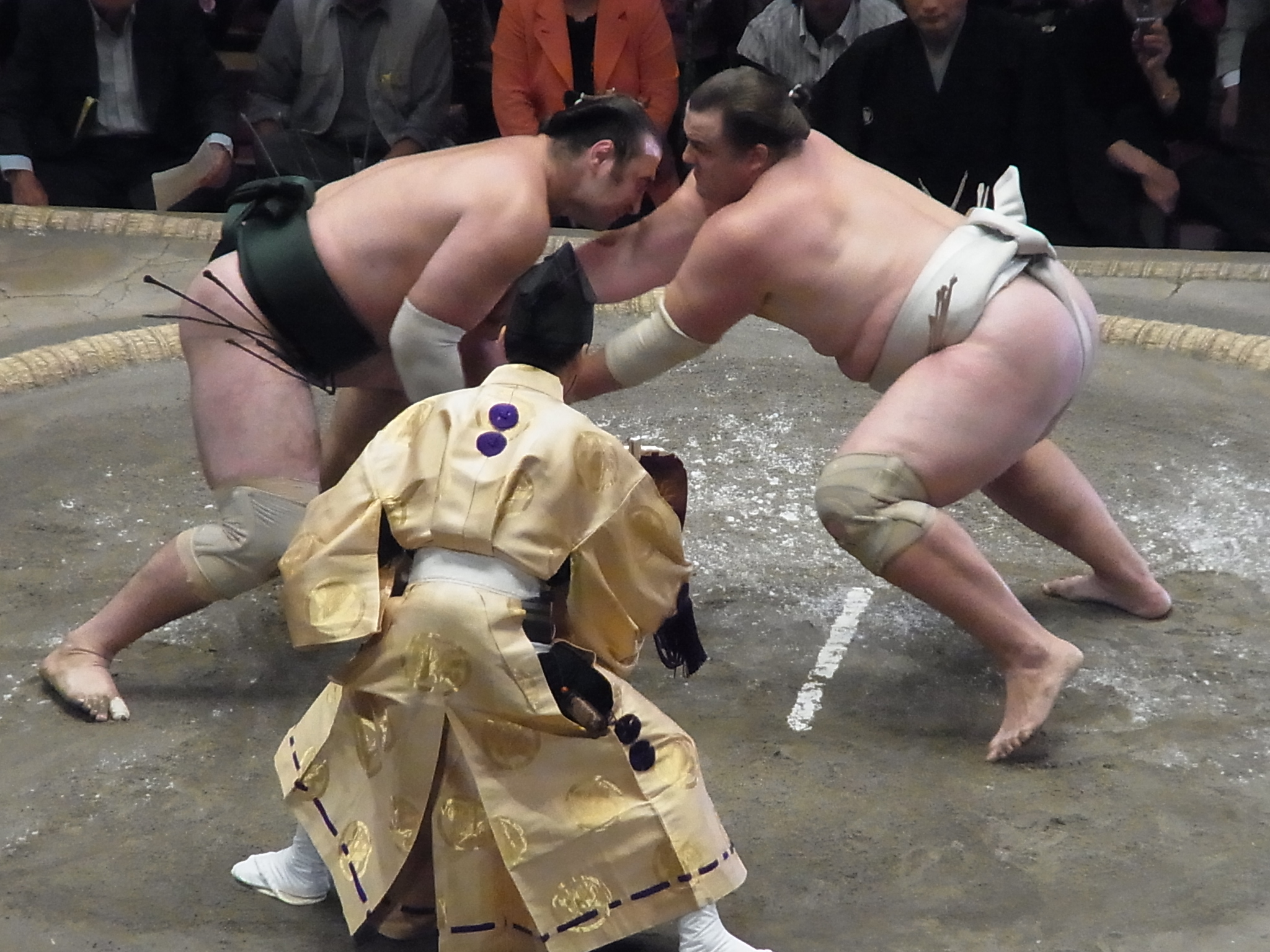
Meiji Jingu Shrine Festival Celebration 70th Dedicated All-Japanese Wrestlers' Championship (October 3, 2011)

== Demotion and retirement ==
Having failed to obtain winning records in two consecutive tournaments, Kotoōshū was relegated back to sekiwake at the January 2014 tournament. He had been an ōzeki for 47 tournaments, which is the fourth highest in sumo history. A record of at least 10–5 at sekiwake in January would have allowed him to immediately regain his ōzeki rank. However, he suffered his 6th loss on the 13th day against Endō. He retired during the following tournament in March after 9 losses in a row, saying "I've had so many injuries recently, but I have no regrets because I gave it my utmost over 12 years."

== After retirement ==
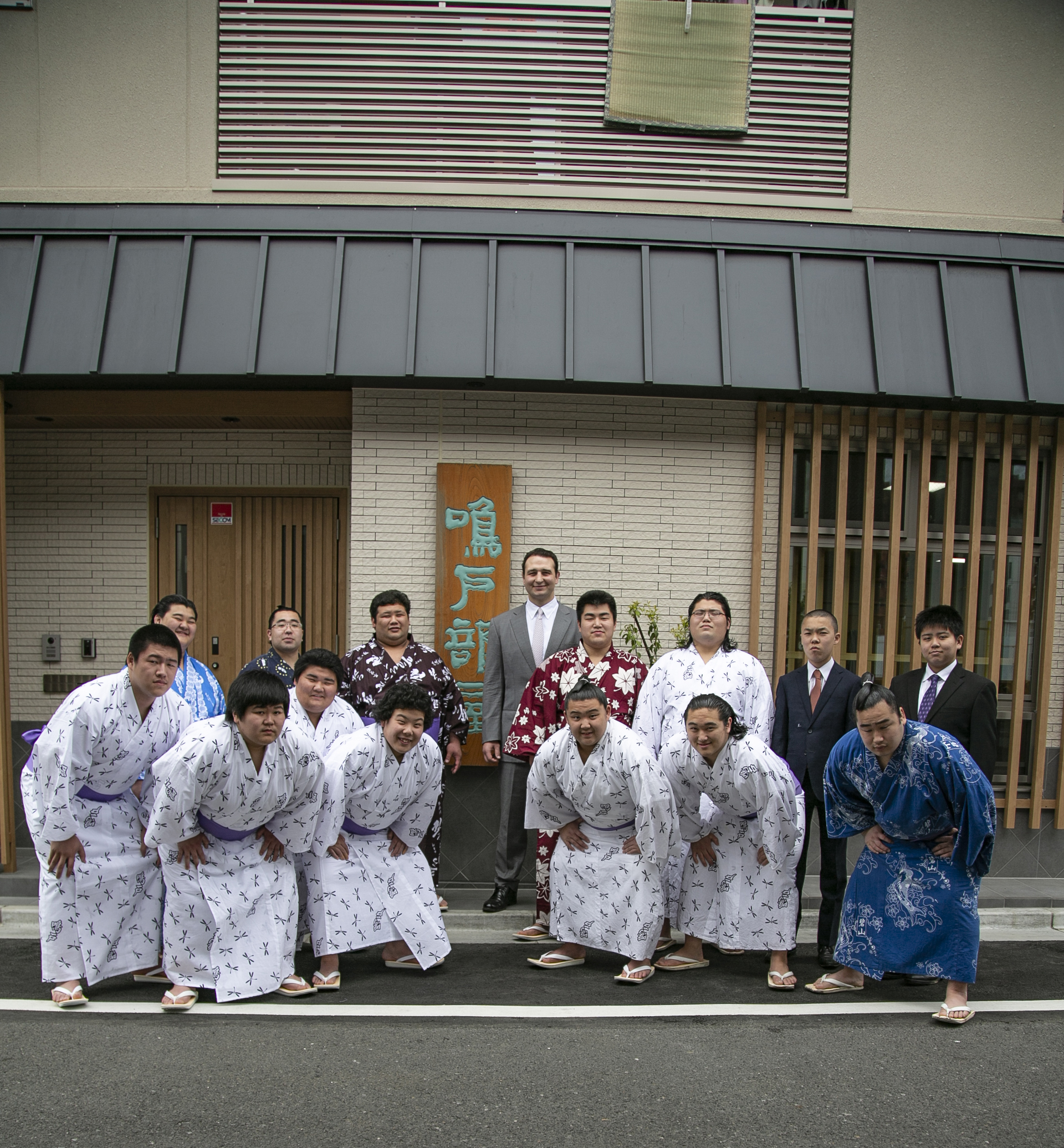
Kotoōshū with wrestlers from Naruto stable

In 2014 Kotoōshū obtained Japanese nationality and legally changed his name to Karoyan Andō (安藤 カロヤン, Andō Karoyan), allowing him to remain in sumo as an elder. He acquired the Naruto toshiyori kabu (elder license) in 2015, and began as a coach at Sadogatake stable.

In April 2017 Kotoōshū opened his own stable of wrestlers, Naruto stable (鳴戸部屋 Naruto-beya). He is the first European-born sumo wrestler to run his own stable and the third wrestler born outside Japan. His title is sumo elder Naruto Katsunori. The stable started with three wrestlers, including a 20-year-old Bulgarian junior wrestling champion. Having studied training theory at Nippon Sport Science University following his retirement, he was keen to develop his own training methods based on his sumo experience and studies at both Bulgarian and Japanese universities.

Kotoōshū was appointed as a shimpan (ringside judge) in March 2022. He made his debut as a judge at the May 2022 tournament.

== Fighting style ==
Kotoōshū was a tall and rather light rikishi at 203 cm (6 feet, 8 inches) and 152 kg (334 pounds). In comparison, former yokozuna (grand champion) Akebono, at the same height, weighed 235 kg (517 pounds) at his peak. Yokozuna Asashōryū had about the same weight, but is only 184 cm in height. Kotoōshū primarily relied on so-called 'belt-throws' to win his sumo bouts. He typically preferred to take a hidari-yotsu (left-hand inside grip) on his opponent's mawashi (the belt that is fixed around the wrestler's waist), although he was right-handed and his overall profile showed him preferring migi-yotsu (right-hand inside grip). He used his long arms and quick footwork to counteract his high center of gravity and relatively light weight. His most common winning kimarite was yorikiri, the force out, followed by uwatenage, the outer arm throw.

Kotoōshū has remarked that his tournament victory was partially due to a weight gain of five kilos which enabled him to be sturdier against his opponents.

== In popular culture ==
- Kotoōshū and a football player, Hristo Stoichkov, are said to be the two most famous Bulgarian people in Japan.
- He is noted for being a fan of the singer Ayaya, so much so that it prompted a commercial where they appear together (although a surprised Kotoōshū found out the day of filming that their parts were to be digitally melded). He often appears in TV commercials of yogurt products. This is because a Japanese dairy company, Meiji, sells a series of yogurt products under the name of Bulgaria Yogurt.
- Because of his good looks, the Japanese audience calls him "Sumo David Beckham", a nickname at which he has repeatedly expressed his displeasure.
- He was chosen as a special judge for the 56th edition of Japan's annual Kōhaku Uta Gassen on December 31, 2005.

=== Awards ===
- He was named Athlete Number 1 for 2005 in Veliko Tarnovo district.
- In 2006 he was awarded the title "Honorary Citizen of Lyaskovets".
- He was made the Goodwill Ambassador to Japan by the European Union in April 2006.
- On July 28, 2009 he was awarded by the President of Bulgaria Georgi Parvanov with the highest state honors – the prestigious Order of Stara Planina.

== Family ==
Kotoōshū's father was born in 1955 or 1956 and his mother was born in 1960 or 1961 in Bulgaria.

One of the reasons that led to Kotoōshū's introduction to sumo wrestling was to help with the household, because his father could not work due to a traffic accident. Kotoōshū sent money to his parents in Bulgaria, but his parents said "I want the child (Kotoōshū) to use it for himself." He has given a washing and drying machine to his mother, a wristwatch to his father, and two cars (a used Ford car and a new Toyota Land Cruiser) to them. In later years Kotoōshū said, "Why do Japanese people ask their parents to send them money after getting started? It's weird."

In May 2009 Kotoōshū announced his engagement to 29-year-old Asako Andō from Ichinomiya, Aichi, whom he had dated for the previous five years. The first time he became acquainted with her, he called her at a convenience store in Nagoya in 2004. A long-distance romance going between Chiba and Aichi continued for five years until he proposed. The following February, had a ceremony at Hie Shrine (Chiyoda-ku). They married in February 2010, on St. Valentine's Day, at the New Otani Hotel in Tokyo, with around 600 guests including yokozuna Hakuhō attending. Kotoōshū acquired the surname of his wife and his official name became Karoyan Andō. They welcomed their first son, Kiril Andō, in November 2011.

He injured his right knee towards the end of the May 2010 tournament which required surgery and forced him to cancel plans to have a second wedding ceremony in Bulgaria, at the Evksinograd resort in Varna, during the European Sumo Championships.

== Career record ==
Kotoōshū Katsunori
Year	January Hatsu basho, Tokyo	March Haru basho, Osaka	May Natsu basho, Tokyo	July Nagoya basho, Nagoya	September Aki basho, Tokyo	November Kyūshū basho, Fukuoka
2002	x	x	x	x	x	(Maezumō)
2003	West Jonokuchi #30; 7–0; Champion	West Jonidan #25; 6–1	West Sandanme #62; 6–1	East Sandanme #8; 6–1	East Makushita #33; 5–2	West Makushita #21; 5–2
2004	East Makushita #8; 6–1	East Makushita #2; 7–0; Champion	East Jūryō #10; 10–5	East Jūryō #3; 13–2; Champion	East Maegashira #14; 9–6	West Maegashira #10; 11–4; F
2005	East Maegashira #4; 9–6	West Komusubi #1; 4–11	East Maegashira #5; 10–5	East Komusubi #1; 12–3; O	East Sekiwake #1; 13–2–P; F	East Sekiwake #1; 11–4; FO
2006	West Ōzeki #2; 10–5	West Ōzeki #1; 9–6	West Ōzeki #1; 8–7	West Ōzeki #2; 8–7	West Ōzeki #2; 10–5	West Ōzeki #1; 10–5
2007	East Ōzeki #1; 9–6	East Ōzeki #2; 8–7	West Ōzeki #1; 9–6	East Ōzeki #2; 9–6	West Ōzeki #1; 8–7	East Ōzeki #2; 2–5–8
2008	West Ōzeki #2; 9–6	East Ōzeki #1; 2–7–6	West Ōzeki #2; 14–1	East Ōzeki #1; 9–6	West Ōzeki #1; 8–7	West Ōzeki #2; 8–7
2009	East Ōzeki #2; 10–5	East Ōzeki #1; 10–5	East Ōzeki #1; 9–6	West Ōzeki #1; 13–2	East Ōzeki #1; 9–6	East Ōzeki #1; 10–5
2010	East Ōzeki #1; 9–6	West Ōzeki #1; 10–5	West Ōzeki #1; 9–6	East Ōzeki #2; 10–5	West Ōzeki #1; 10–5	East Ōzeki #1; 8–7
2011	East Ōzeki #2; 10–5	East Ōzeki #1; Tournament Cancelled; Match fixing investigation 0–0–0	East Ōzeki #1; 3–8–4	West Ōzeki #2; 9–6	West Ōzeki #2; 1–6–8	East Ōzeki #2; 9–6
2012	East Ōzeki #2; 10–5	West Ōzeki #2; 8–7	East Ōzeki #3; 8–7	East Ōzeki #3; 9–6	East Ōzeki #3; 2–4–9	West Ōzeki #2; 9–6
2013	East Ōzeki #2; 10–5	West Ōzeki #1; 1–5–9	West Ōzeki #2; 8–7	West Ōzeki #2; 9–6	West Ōzeki #2; 4–3–8	West Ōzeki #2; 1–3–11
2014	West Sekiwake #1; 8–7	West Sekiwake #1; Retired; 1–10	x	x	x	x
Record given as wins–losses–absences Top division champion Top division runner-up Retired Non-participation Jūryō Lower divisions Sanshō key: F=Fighting spirit; O=Outstanding performance; T=Technique Also shown: ★=Kinboshi; P=Playoff(s); Divisions: Makuuchi — Jūryō — Makushita — Sandanme — Jonidan — Jonokuchi Makuuchi ranks: Yokozuna — Ōzeki — Sekiwake — Komusubi — Maegashira

== See also ==
- Glossary of sumo terms
- List of sumo tournament top division champions
- List of sumo tournament top division runners-up
- List of sumo tournament second division champions
- List of non-Japanese sumo wrestlers
- List of past sumo wrestlers
- List of sumo elders
- List of ōzeki
