= Lyaskovo =

Lyaskovo may refer to:

- In Bulgaria (written in Cyrillic as Лясково):
  - Lyaskovo, Burgas Province - a village in the Aytos municipality, Burgas Province
  - Lyaskovo, Dobrich Province - a village in the Dobrichka municipality, Dobrich Province
  - Lyaskovo, Kardzhali Province - a village in the Chernoochene municipality, Kardzhali Province
  - Lyaskovo, Plovdiv Province - a village in the Asenovgrad municipality, Plovdiv Province
  - Lyaskovo, Smolyan Province - a village in the Devin municipality, Smolyan Province
  - Lyaskovo, Stara Zagora Province - a village in the Stara Zagora municipality, Stara Zagora Province

== See also ==
- Leskovo (disambiguation)
- Lyaskovets
