= Dzhulunitsa, Veliko Tarnovo Province =

Dzhulunitsa
- Village
- Dzhulunitsa
- Location within Bulgaria
- Coordinates: 43.137436°N 25.901718°E
- Country: Bulgaria
- Province: Veliko Tarnovo
- Municipality: Lyaskovets

Area
  - Total: 39.558 km^{2} (15.273 sq mi)
- Elevation: 106 m (348 ft)

Population
  - Total: 1,673
- Postal code: 5146
- Area code: 0619

Dzhulunitsa is a village in Northern Bulgaria. The village is located in Lyaskovets Municipality, Veliko Tarnovo Province. Аccording to the numbers provided by the 2020 Bulgarian census, Dzhulunitsa currently has a population of 1,673 people with a permanent address registration in the settlement.

== Geography and culture ==
Dzhulunitsa village is in Northern Bulgaria. The elevation varies between 63 and 385 meters, with an average of 106 meters. The climate is continental. It lies on the borders of the Balkan Mountains and the Danubian Plain (Bulgaria). The highest geographical point of the area is 385 m with the peak "The Pyramid" in the area "Romana". There is a very well developed vegetable production, viticulture, fruit growing, animal husbandry and grain production in the village. A river with the same name as the village passes through it.

== History ==
The name of the village comes from the word Dzhulun, which means a water caltrop. In the area around the village, a lot of natural growing water caltrops can be found. The first mentions of the village date back to the 13th century. The oldest ever found burial on the Balkan peninsula is near the village. (A mound from the Neolithic period, which is located near the highway and was covered by national television.)

The village's festival is held yearly on 15 August. It is also called the potato festival and is organized by the local pension club. During the Balkan wars, one person has volunteered from the village to join the war.

=== Buildings ===
- Elementary school (Was built in 1834)
- Kindergarten (Established in 1966)
- Pharmacy
- Orthodox Church
- Hospital

=== Notable people ===
Most notable person from the village is Kotoōshū Katsunori, a rikishi Japanese sumo fighter.

== Ethnicity ==
According to the Bulgarian population census in 2011.

	Number	Percentage(in %)
Total	1,895	100.00
Bulgarians	1,858	98.04
Turks	3	0.15
Romani	8	0.42
Others	0	0
Do not define themselves	0	0
Unanswered	20	1.05
