= Merdanya =

- Village
- Merdanya
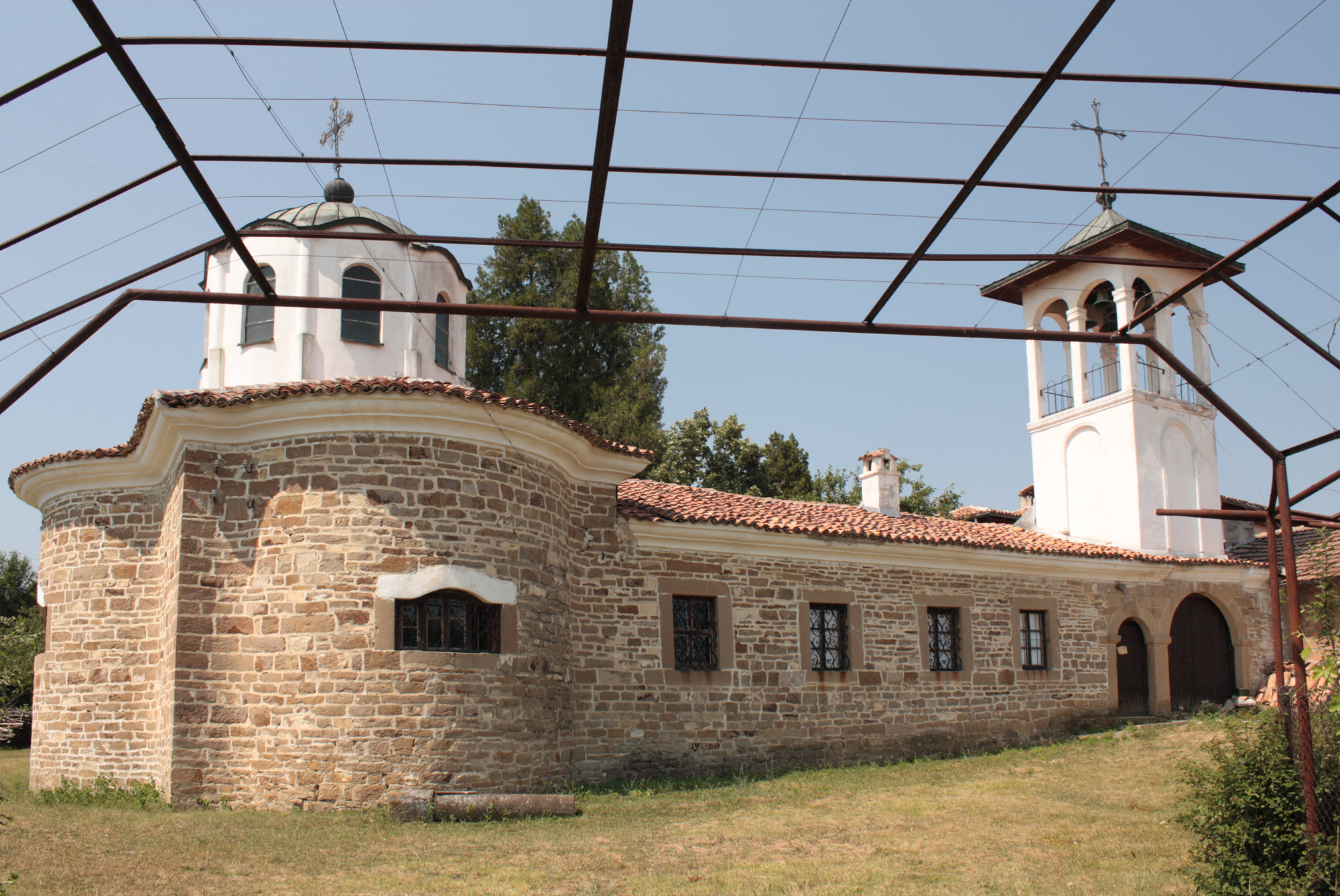
- Monastery of Merdanya Photography

- Location within Bulgaria
- Coordinates: 43.057728°N 25.783215°E
- Country: Bulgaria
- Province: Veliko Tarnovo
- Municipality: Lyaskovets

Area
  - Total: 20.82 km^{2} (8.04 sq mi)
- Elevation: 254 m (833 ft)

Population
  - Total: 602
- Postal code: 5147
- Area code: 061962

Merdanya is a village in Northern Bulgaria, in Lyaskovets Municipality, Veliko Tarnovo Province. Аccording to the 2020 Bulgarian census, Dzhulunitsa has a population of 602 people with a permanent address registration in the settlement.

== Geography ==
Merdanya village is in Northern Bulgaria and takes part of the Elena Balkan, a well-developed tourist area.

The elevation in the village varies between 100 and 300 meters with an average of 254 meters. The climate is continental. It lies on the borders of the Balkan Mountains and the Danubian Plain (Bulgaria).

The village has vegetable production, viticulture, and fruit growing.

== Culture ==
There is a centuries-old monastery located in the western part of Merdanya known as the Merdanya Monastery.

The monastery "Sv Chetiridiset Matchenitsi" is 14 kilometers southeast from Veliko Tarnovo, at the western end of Merdanya village.

It was built during the 13th century and rebuilt in the 19th century. It is an acting women's monastery as of now.

The village's festival is held on 26 October each year, Dimitrovden. It is the same day the local church honors its saint-patron.

== Ethnicity ==
According to the Bulgarian population census in 2011.

	Number	Percentage(in %)
Total	591	100.00
Bulgarians	572	96.78
Turks	5	0.84
Romani	0	0
Others	0	0
Do not define themselves	0	0
Unanswered	13	2.19
