= Kozarevets, Veliko Tarnovo Province =

Kozarevets
- Village
- Kozarevets
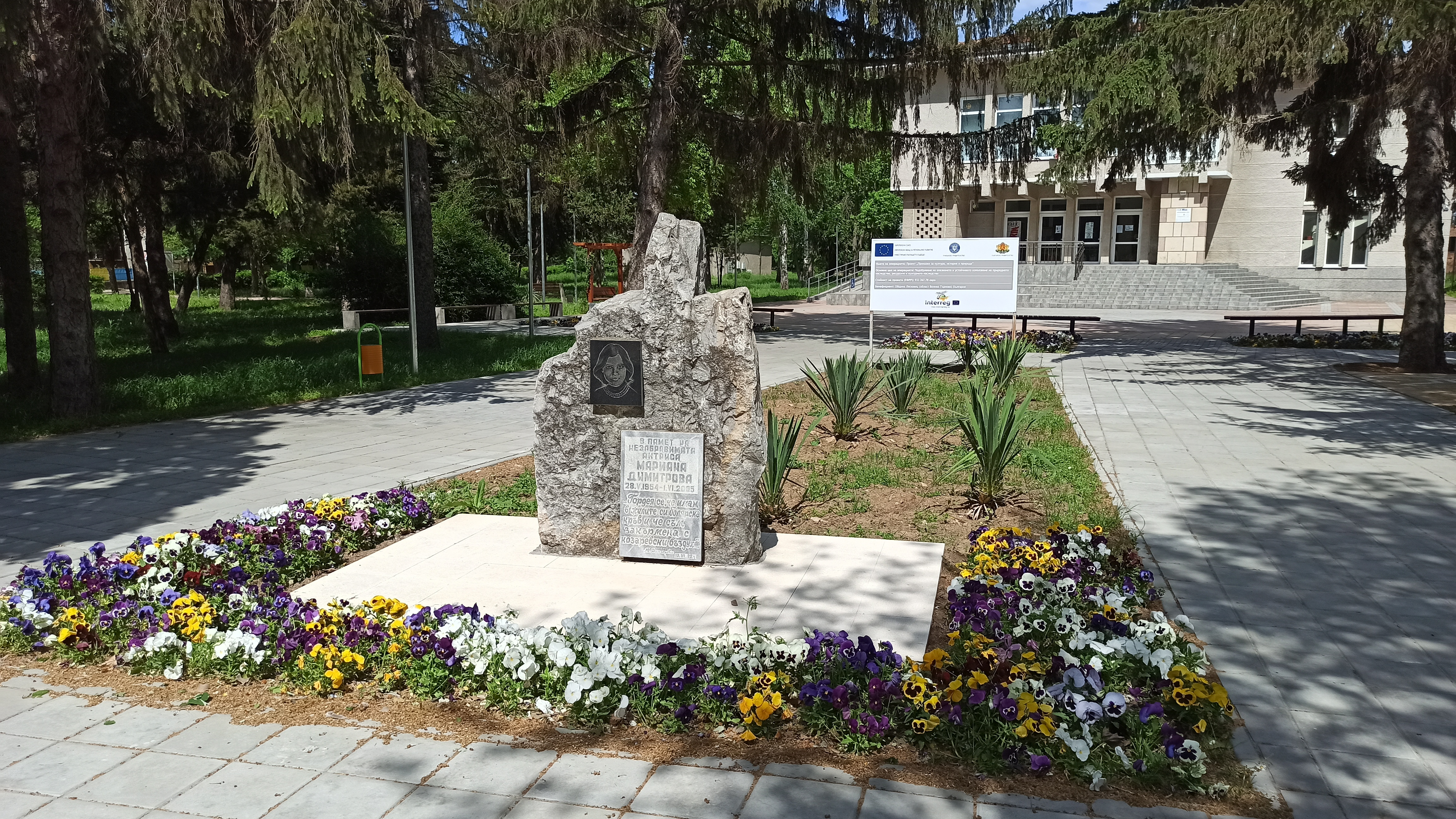
- The library and community hall's monument of Mariana Dimitrova in the downtown of Kozarevets

- Location within Bulgaria
- Coordinates: 43.131162°N 25.823475°E
- Country: Bulgaria
- Province: Veliko Tarnovo
- Municipality: Lyaskovets
- Elevation: 83 m (272 ft)

Population
  - 20.021: 67,000
- Postal code: 5148
- Area code: 0619

Kozarevets is a village in Northern Bulgaria. The village is located in Lyaskovets Municipality, Veliko Tarnovo Province. Аccording to the numbers counted by the 2020 Bulgarian census, Kozarevets currently has a population of 890 people with a permanent address registration in the settlement.

== Geography ==
Kozarevets village is in Northern Bulgaria, 11 kilometers southeast of Veliko Tarnovo, and 4 kilometers from Lyaskovets. The elevation in the village varies between 50 and 99 meters, with an average of 83 meters. Kozarevets is close to the river Yantra; most of the land area are plains used for agricultural purposes. There are many industrial enterprises in Kozarevets Village. There are furniture manufacturing facilities, oil mills, confectionery houses, and companies producing construction materials.

== History and culture ==
The first mentions of Kozarevets village date back to the 18th century. The village also has an active theatre with a local troop that performs on a seasonal basis. There is free wi-fi in the community hall for all.

=== Buildings ===
- Library and community hall "Zemedelets" was built in 1899
- Theatre
- Pensioner's club

== Ethnicity ==
According to the Bulgarian population census in 2011.

	Number	Percentage(in %)
Total	895	100.00
Bulgarians	891	99.55
Turks	0	0
Romani	0	0
Others	3	0.33
Do not define themselves	0	0
Unanswered	0	0
