= Dobri Dyal =

- Village
- Dobri Dyal
- Location within Bulgaria
- Coordinates: 43.111208°N 25.833004°E
- Country: Bulgaria
- Province: Veliko Tarnovo
- Municipality: Lyaskovets

Area
  - Total: 30.679 km^{2} (11.845 sq mi)
- Elevation: 121 m (397 ft)

Population
  - Total: 1,101
- Postal code: 5149
- Area code: 0619

Dobri Dyal is a village in Northern Bulgaria. The village is located in Lyaskovets Municipality, Veliko Tarnovo Province. Аccording to the numbers provided by the 2020 Bulgarian census, Dobri Dyal currently has a population of 1101 people with a permanent address registration in the settlement.

== Geography and culture ==
Dobri Dyal village is located in Northern Bulgaria

The elevation in the village varies between 100 and 199 meters with an average of 121 meters.

The first mentions of the village date back to Thracian times. There is a Byzantine stronghold near the village which was built in the 5th century. Its name is the "Mihneva Mogila".

The village's festival is held yearly on the date of 15 August. It is also called the potato festival and is organized by the local pension club.

=== Buildings ===
- There is an acting city hall and library since 1903.
- Elementary school "Ivan Vazov”

== Ethnicity ==
According to the Bulgarian population census in 2011.

	Number	Percentage(in %)
Total	960	100.00
Bulgarians	650	67.70
Turks	144	15.00
Romani	143	14.89
Others	0	0
Do not define themselves	11	1.14
Unanswered	12	1.25
