= Leszkowice =

Leszkowice may refer to the following places in Poland:

- Leszkowice, Lower Silesian Voivodeship (south-west Poland)
- Leszkowice, Lublin Voivodeship (east Poland)
