= Leskovica (Aleksandrovac) =

- Village
- Location within Serbia
- Coordinates: 43°31′25″N 21°00′37″E
- Country: Serbia
- District: Šumadija
- Municipality: Aleksandrovac

Population (2002)
  - Total: 298
- Time zone: UTC+1 (CET)
  - Summer (DST): UTC+2 (CEST)

Leskovica (Serbian Cyrillic: Лесковица) is a village in the municipality of Aleksandrovac, Serbia. At the time of the 2002 census, the village had a population of 315 people.

== See also ==
- List of places in Serbia
