= Leskovec, Ivančna Gorica =

Leskovec
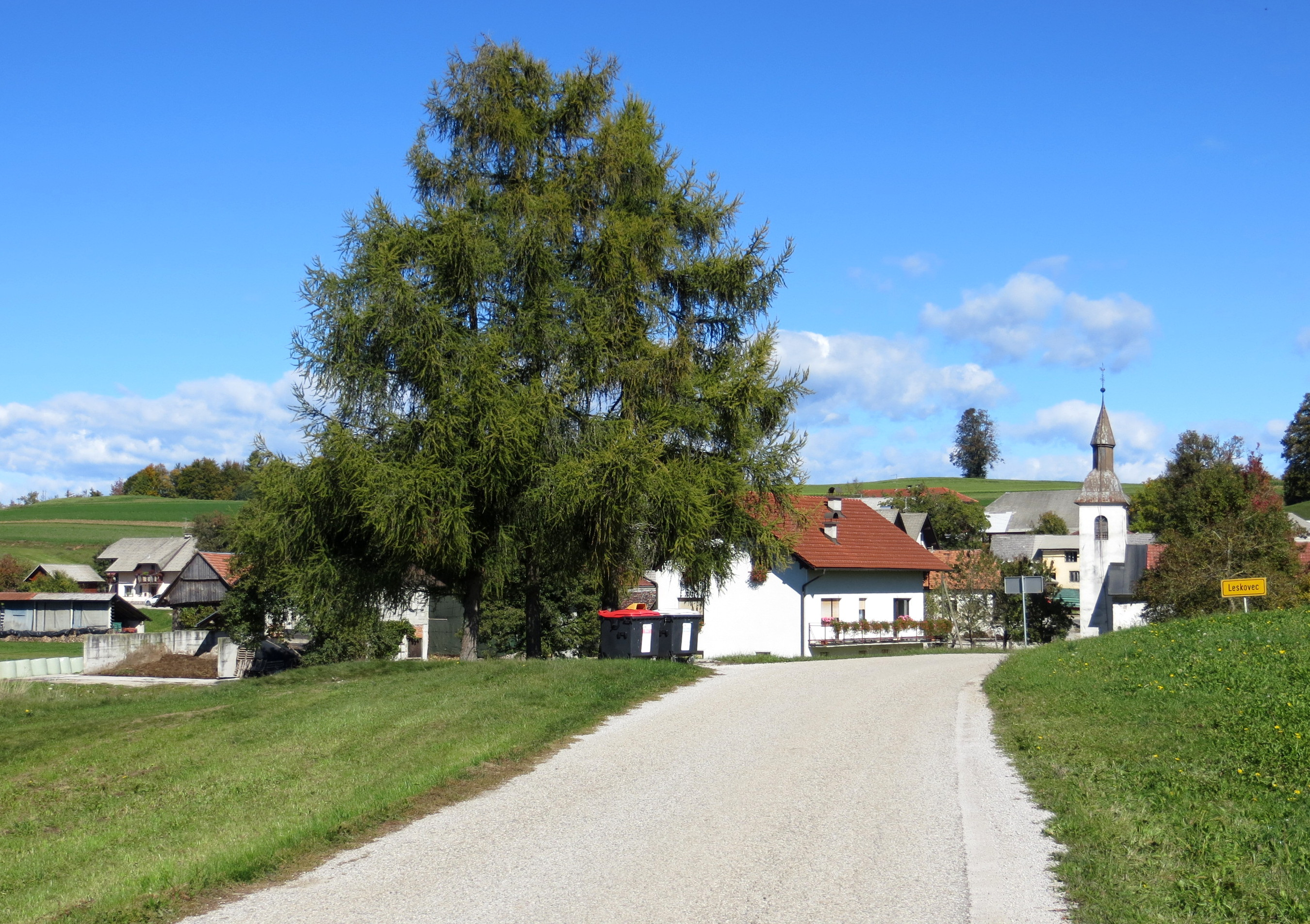

- Location in Slovenia
- Coordinates: 45°59′17.25″N 14°45′6.85″E
- Country: Slovenia
- Traditional region: Lower Carniola
- Statistical region: Central Slovenia
- Municipality: Ivančna Gorica

Area
  - Total: 4.78 km^{2} (1.85 sq mi)
- Elevation: 667.2 m (2,189 ft)

Population (2002)
  - Total: 98

Leskovec (pronounced [lɛˈskɔːʋəts] or [lɛˈskoːʋəts]; German: Leskouz) is a small village in the hills north of Višnja Gora in the Municipality of Ivančna Gorica in central Slovenia. The area is part of the historical region of Lower Carniola. The municipality is now included in the Central Slovenia Statistical Region.

== Church ==
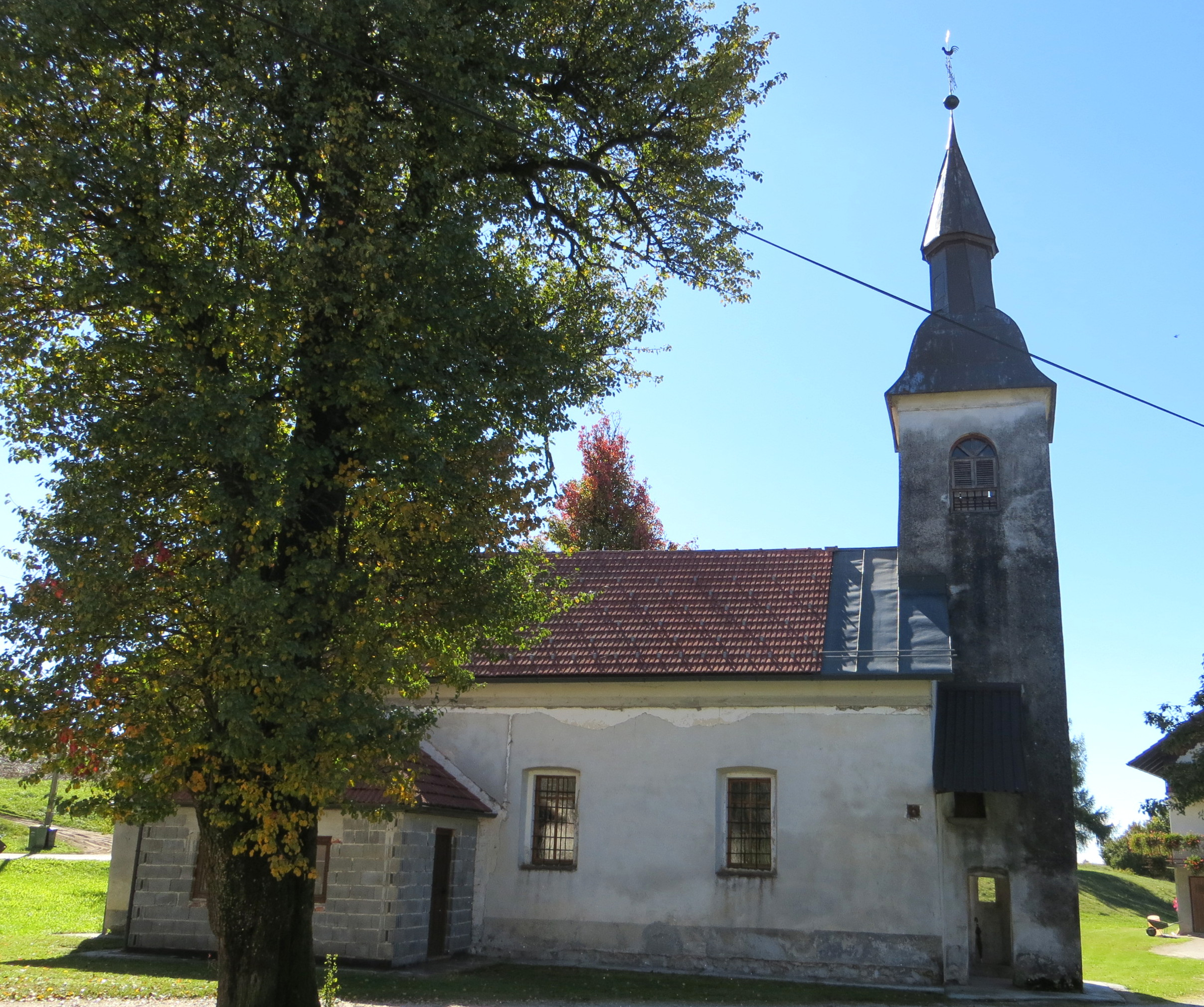
Saint Oswald's Church

The local church is dedicated to Saint Oswald (Slovene: sveti Ožbolt) and belongs to the Parish of Višnja Gora. It is a medieval building that was restyled in the Baroque in the 17th century.
