= Leskovo, Vologda Oblast =

Leskovo Лесково
- Settlement
- Location within Vologda Oblast Location within Russia
- Coordinates: 59°12′N 39°38′E
- Country: Russia
- Region: Vologda Oblast
- District: Vologodsky District
- Time zone: UTC+3:00

Leskovo (Russian: Лесково) is a rural locality (a settlement) in Leskovsky Selsoviet, Vologodsky District, Vologda Oblast, Russia. The population was 707 as of 2002. There are 8 streets.

== Geography ==
Leskovo is located 16 km west of Vologda (the district's administrative centre) by road. Pochinok is the nearest rural locality.
