= Leskovo, Demir Hisar =

Leskovo Лесково
- Village
- Air view of the village

- Location within North Macedonia
- Coordinates: 41.221944°N 21.120556°E
- Country: North Macedonia
- Region: Pelagonia
- Municipality: Demir Hisar

Population (2002)
  - Total: 0
- Time zone: UTC+1 (CET)
  - Summer (DST): UTC+2 (CEST)
- Website: .

Leskovo (Macedonian: Лесково) is a depopulated village in the municipality of Demir Hisar, North Macedonia.

== Demographics ==
In the 1467/1468 Ottoman defter, the village had 37 households, 2 bachelors and 2 widows. A majority of household heads bore Slavic names, while around a sixth of them carried Albanian ones.

In statistics gathered by Vasil Kanchov in 1900, the village of Leskovo was inhabited by 260 Christian Bulgarians.

According to the 2002 census, the village had a total of 0 inhabitants.
