= Leskovac (Knić) =

Coordinates: 43°50′40″N 20°44′36″E

Leskovac Лесковац
- Village
- Interactive map of Leskovac
- Country: Serbia
- District: Šumadija District
- Municipality: Knić
- Time zone: UTC+1 (CET)
  - Summer (DST): UTC+2 (CEST)

Leskovac (Serbian: Лесковац) is a village situated in Knić municipality in Serbia.
