= Dragizhevo =

- Village
- Dragizhevo
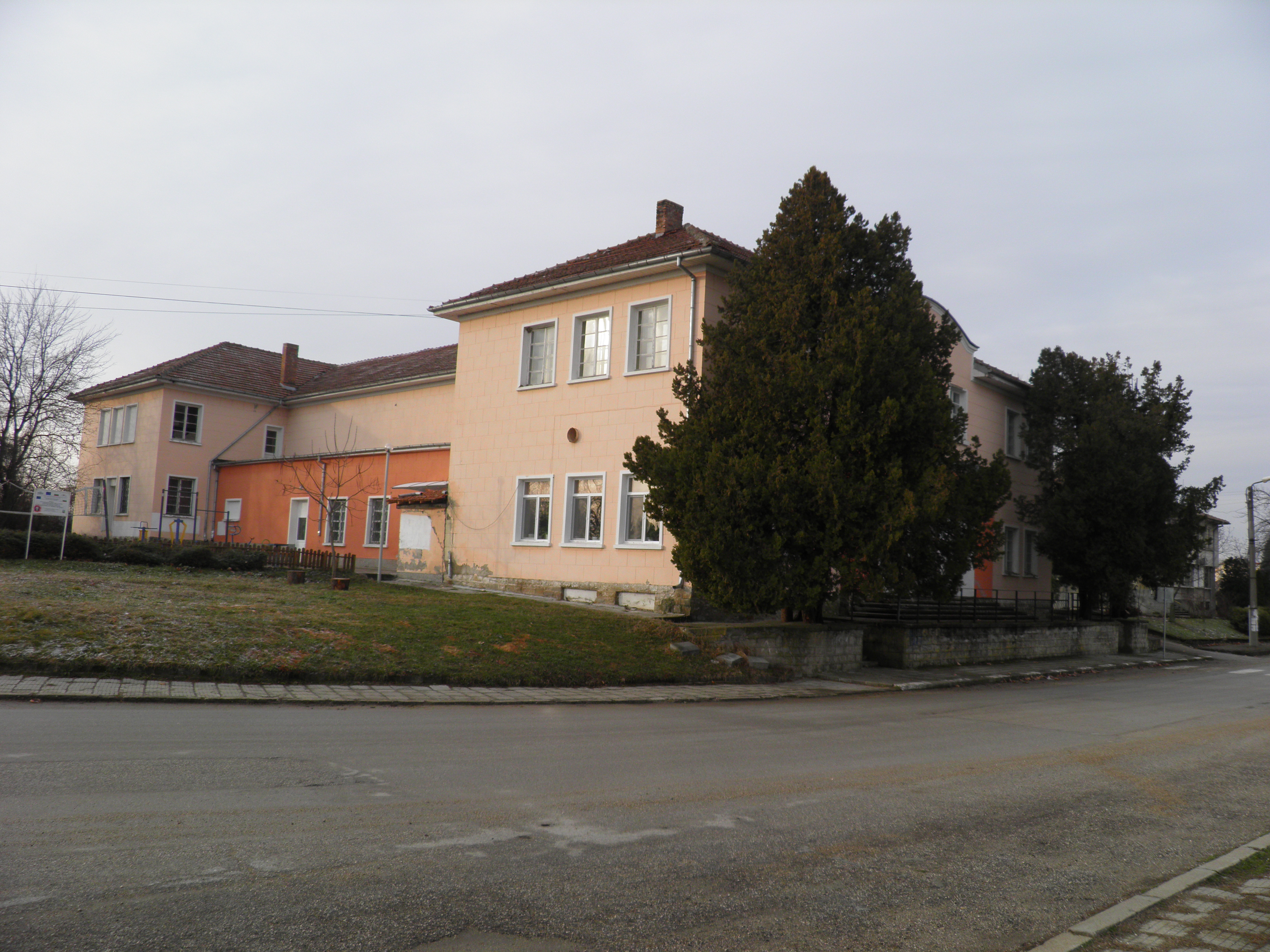
- The Culture Center of Dragizhevo

- Location within Bulgaria
- Coordinates: 43.068219°N 25.740833°E
- Country: Bulgaria
- Province: Veliko Tarnovo
- Municipality: Lyaskovets

Area
  - Total: 16.823 km^{2} (6.495 sq mi)
- Elevation: 210 m (690 ft)

Population
  - Total: 921
- Postal code: 5145
- Area code: 0619

Dragizhevo is a village in Northern Bulgaria. The village is in Lyaskovets Municipality, Veliko Tarnovo Province. Аccording to the 2020 Bulgarian census, Dragizhevo has a population of 921 people with a permanent address registration in the settlement.

== Geography ==
Dragizhevo village is in Northern Bulgaria, 11 kilometers southeast of Veliko Tarnovo, and 4 kilometers from Lyaskovets.

The elevation in the village varies between 200 and 299 meters with an average of 210 meters.

The climate is continental, with a cold winter and a warm summer, making it a good place for agriculture and animal husbandry.

== History and culture ==
The initial establishment of the settlement began with the merger of four or six smaller villages – Batley, Dzhurovets, Fashkovets, and Sharkovets.

=== Buildings ===
- In 1894 the village built its current library and community hall "Razvitie".
- Half a kilometer away from the village, the Medieval Ottoman Stronghold Gradishte's remains can be found.
- In 1888 the high school "Kiril i Metodii" was built. The first headmaster was Atanas Dachov.
- The church was built in 1837. "Sv Konstantin i Elena"

== Ethnicity ==
According to the Bulgarian population census in 2011.

| | Number | Percentage(in %) |
| Total | 831 | 100.00 |
| Bulgarians | 736 | 88.56 |
| Turks | 5 | 0.60 |
| Romani | 6 | 0.72 |
| Others | 18 | 2.16 |
| Do not define themselves | 0 | 0 |
| Unanswered | 64 | 7.70 |
