= Leskovac Airport =

Leskovac Airport may refer to any of these airports serving Leskovac, Serbia:

- Mira Airport
- Bojnik Airport
