= Leskovac (Zaječar) =

Leskovac Лесковац
- Village
- Location within Serbia
- Coordinates: 43°49′05″N 22°12′01″E
- Country: Serbia
- District: Zaječar District
- Municipality: Zaječar

Population (2002)
  - Total: 128
- Time zone: UTC+1 (CET)
  - Summer (DST): UTC+2 (CEST)

Leskovac is a village in the municipality of Zaječar, Serbia. According to the 2002 census, the village has a population of 128 people.
