= Merdanya Monastery =

Monastery in Veliko Tarnovo Province, Bulgaria

Merdanya Monastery "Holy Forty Martyrs" is medieval Bulgarian monastery located in Veliko Tarnovo Province. The Monastery were established in XIII century. The monastery was demolished and rebuilt several times. In the middle of the 19th century, Hadji Kesariy Khorozov from the near town Elena bought the former monastery properties. In 1853 he built the church and the residential buildings with his own funds and became abbot of the newly opened monastery.

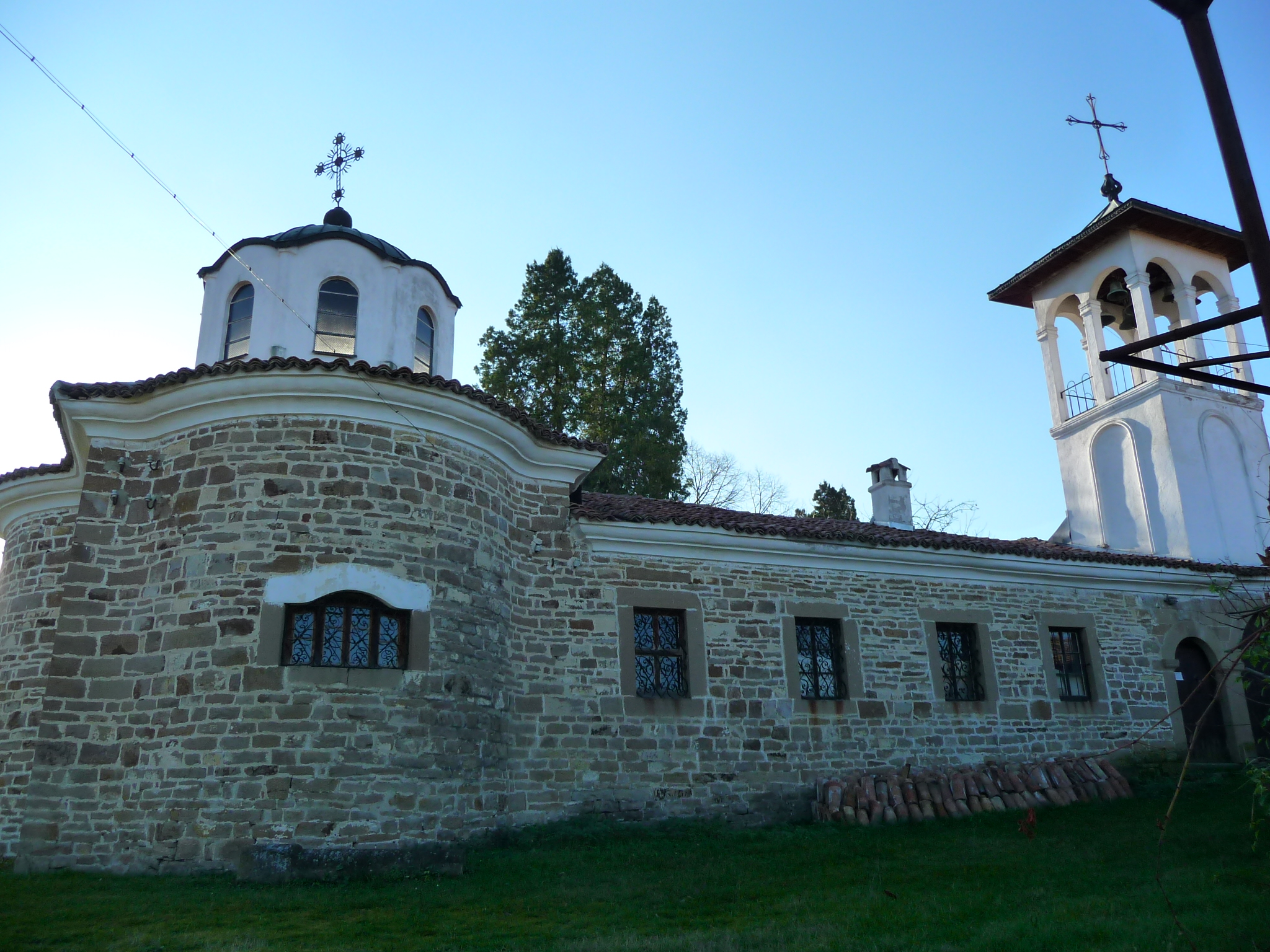
Merdanya monastery

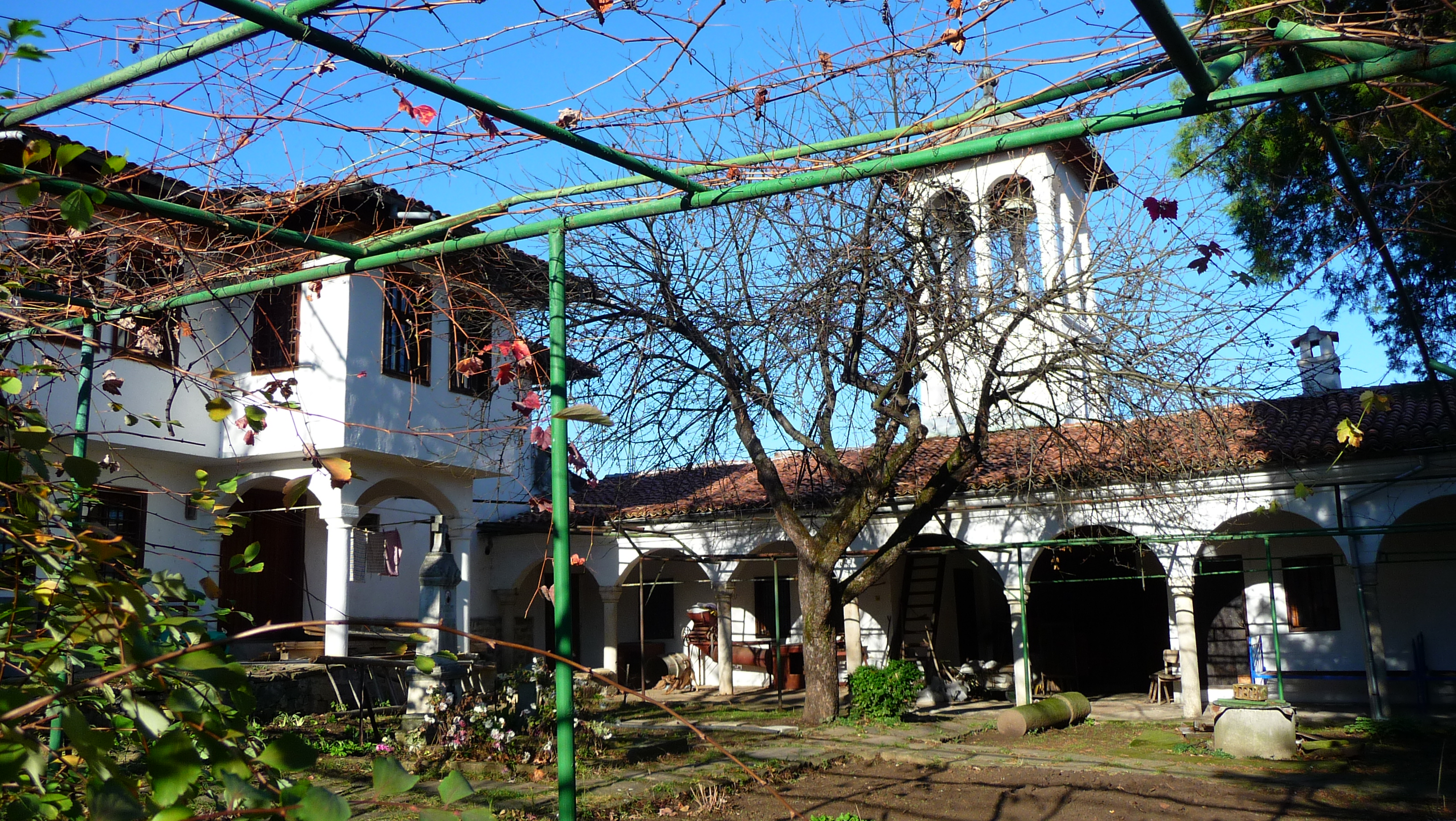
