= Lyaskovets =

Lyaskovets Лясковец
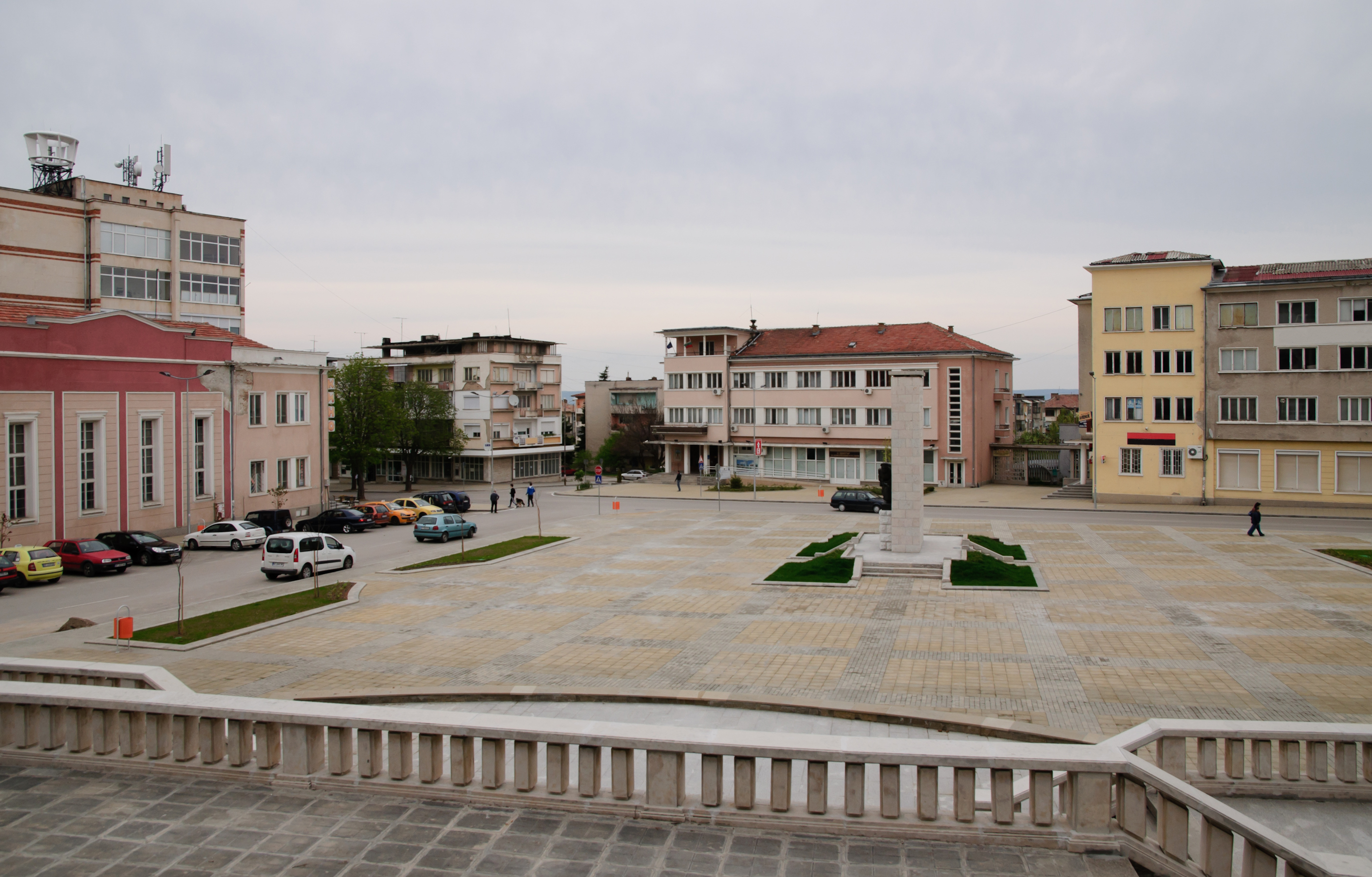
- Lyaskovets central square

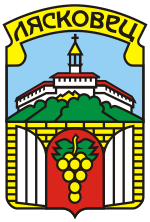
- Coat of arms

- Location of Lyaskovets
- Coordinates: 43°6′N 25°43′E leader_name=D-r Ivelina Getsova
- Country: Bulgaria
- Province (Oblast): Veliko Tarnovo
- Elevation: 192–256 m (630–840 ft)

Population (31.12.2009)
  - City: 10,314
  - Urban: 13,735
- Time zone: UTC+2 (EET)
  - Summer (DST): UTC+3 (EEST)
- Postal Code: 5140
- Area code: 0619

Lyaskovets (Bulgarian: Лясковец [ˈʎaskovet͡s]) is a town in central northern Bulgaria, located in homonymous municipality of Veliko Tarnovo Province, 10 km northeast of Veliko Tarnovo, 2 km southeast of Gorna Oryahovitsa and 5 km south of the Yantra River, north of the Balkan Mountains. Its name comes from the word leska ('hazel') or leshnik ('hazelnut'), because the tree was abundant in the area. As of December 2009, the town had a population of 10,314.

Lyaskovets Peak, in the sub-Antarctic, is named after the town.

== Geography ==
Lyaskovets Monastery (Petropavlovski monastery) is located on a hill southwest of town.

== History ==
The area around the town has been inhabited since the 4th millennium BC, but grew as an important Bulgarian settlement in the Middle Ages, during the Second Bulgarian Empire, because of its proximity to the capital fortress of Veliko Tarnovo. The SS Peter and Paul Monastery helped its development as a religious centre, and Lyaskovets took the form of five neighbourhoods named after their respective churches (for which the town is still famous): St Athanasius, St Basil, St George, St Demetrius and St Nicholas. These neighbourhoods were established at different time by settlers, and grew to merge as one.

After the Ottoman conquest of Bulgaria in the 14th century, Lyaskovets, together with the neighbouring villages of Gorna Oryahovitsa, Dolna Oryahovitsa and Arbanasi, was formally regarded as autonomous (i.e. not part of the rayah) according to a 1538 decree of Selim II. Though this was confirmed by later decrees, such as one by Mahmud II in 1810, Lyaskovets (Turkish: Leskofça) developed as a centre of revolutionary activity, and three armed uprisings set off from the monastery in the 18th and 19th century.

Lyaskovets was bloodlessly liberated by the Imperial Russian Army in June 1877 due to the flight of the Ottoman garrison in the town after having heard that Veliko Tarnovo was captured, and became part of the Principality of Bulgaria. The former village was proclaimed a town on 15 March 1880.

During the 18th century, the local inhabitants decided to produce vegetables on a large scale, mainly potatoes, tomatoes, okra, peas, eggplants, carrots, peppers and okra. This is the main reason why Lyaskovets has a unique museum dedicated to vegetable production and gardening. The museum has a rich inventory of the tools of local farmers from past centuries. Optimal organization plans of a garden, tools, work habits, and documents that state proper distribution of labor are also shown in the museum.

An earthquake in 1913 with a Richter magnitude of 7.0 destroyed many of the brick buildings in the town, including all five churches, which were later reconstructed. The earthquake claimed seven victims and injured over 30.

== Education ==
- Primary school "Tzani Ginchev"
- Primary school "Nikola Kozlev"
- High school "Maxim Raikovich"

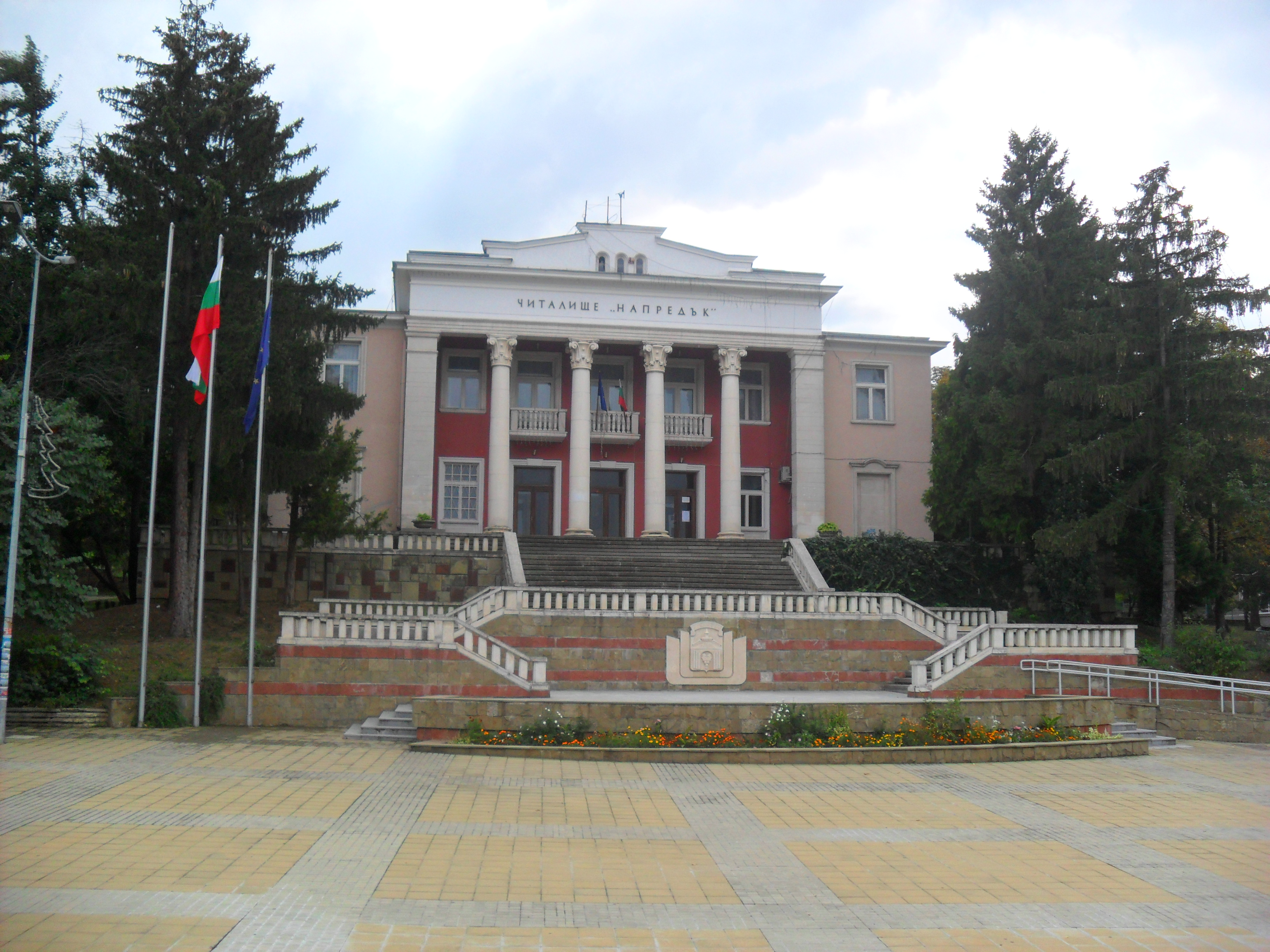
Communication center "Napredak"

== Economy ==
In the town one of the biggest factories is the company Arkus AD. It began as a machine factory and today is producing military products. FMA AD is one factory for packing metal sheets for the needs of the country and the industry. It had some factories for fireplaces, carpet, wines and others.

== Municipality ==
Lyaskovets is also the seat of Lyaskovets municipality (part of Veliko Tarnovo Province), which includes the following 5 villages:

- Dobri Dyal (Добри дял)
- Dragizhevo (Драгижево)
- Dzhulyunitsa (Джулюница)
- Kozarevets (Козаревец)
- Merdanya (Мерданя)

== Gallery ==
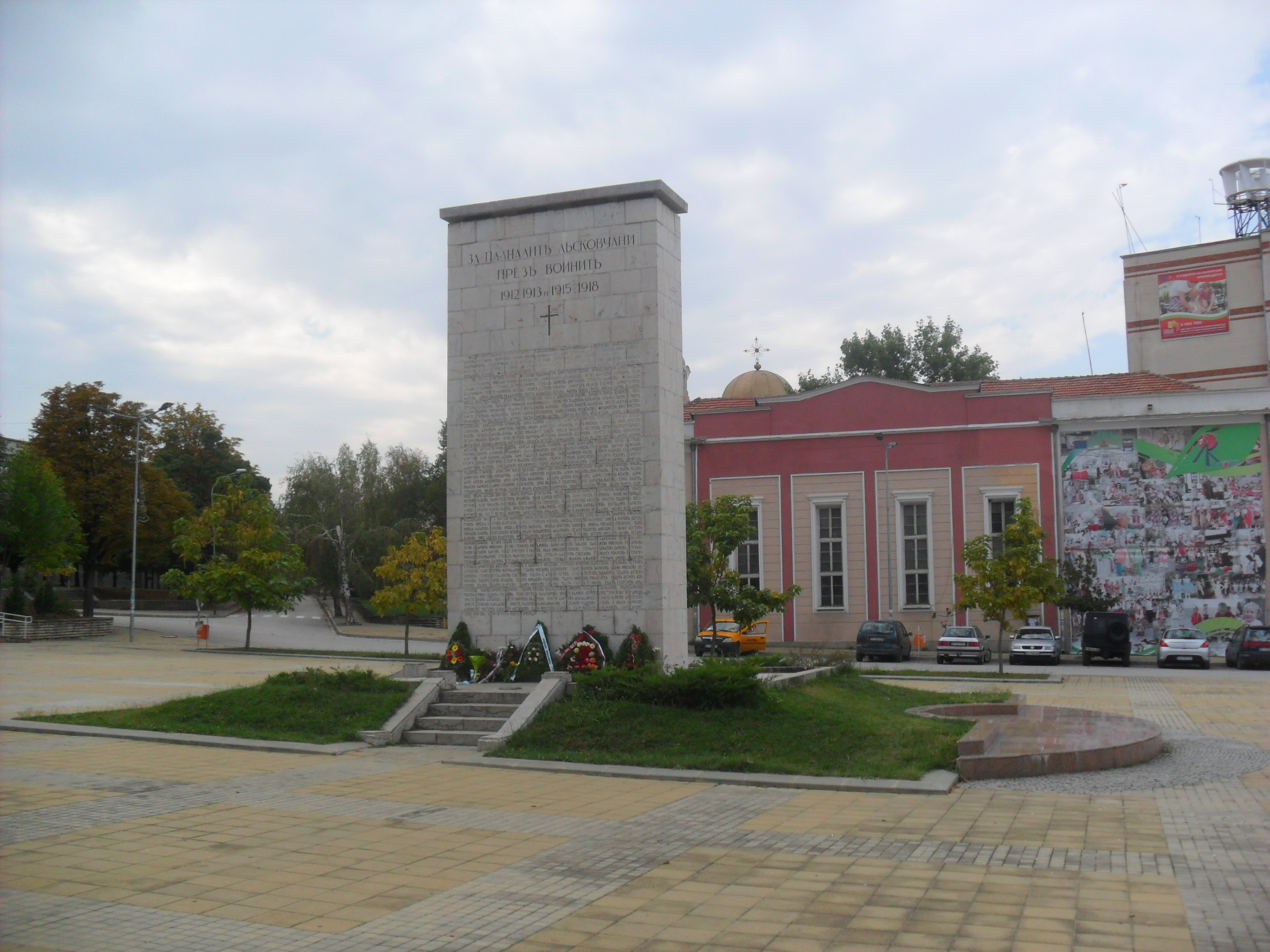
Monument of the heroes from the wars

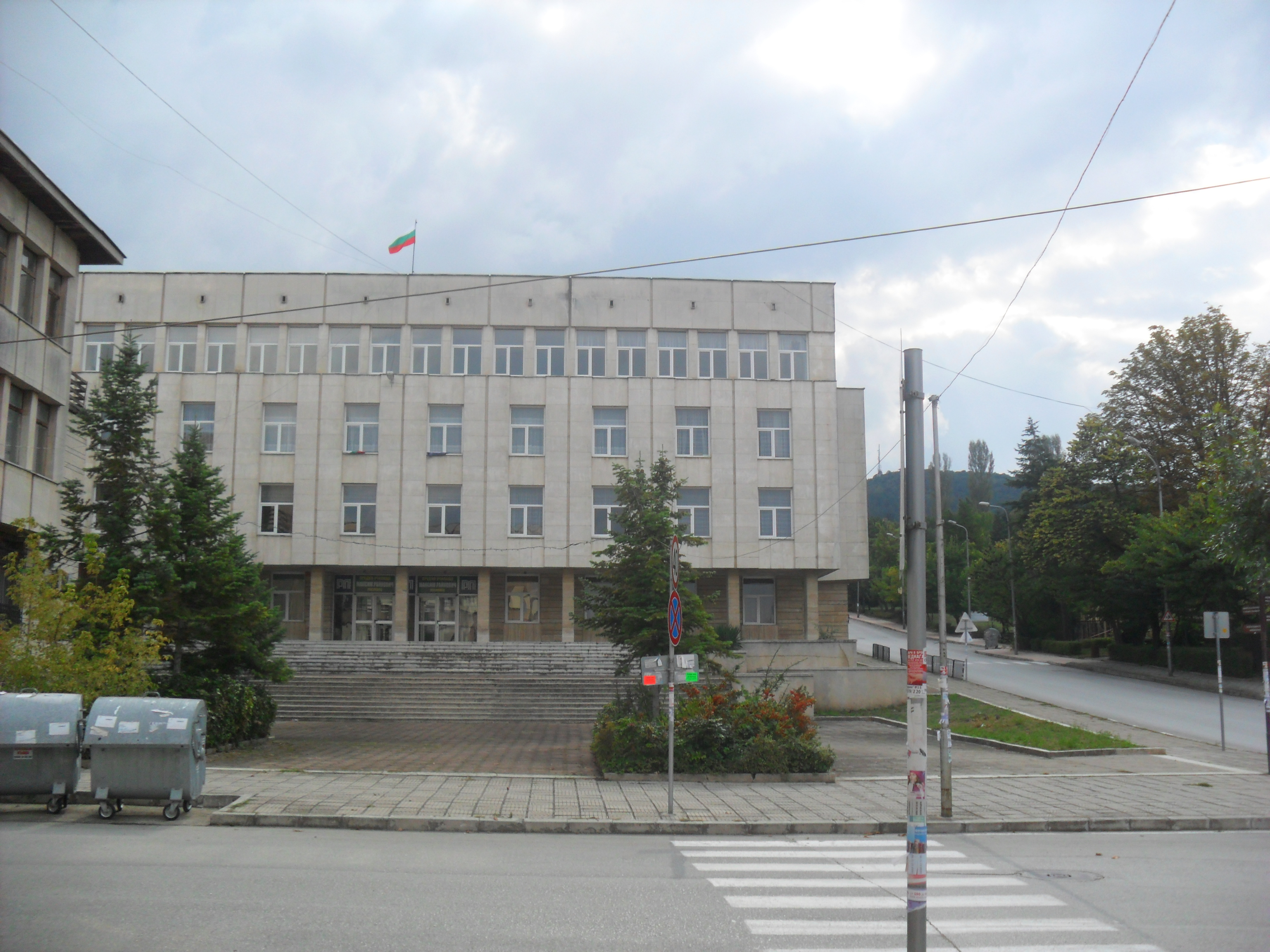

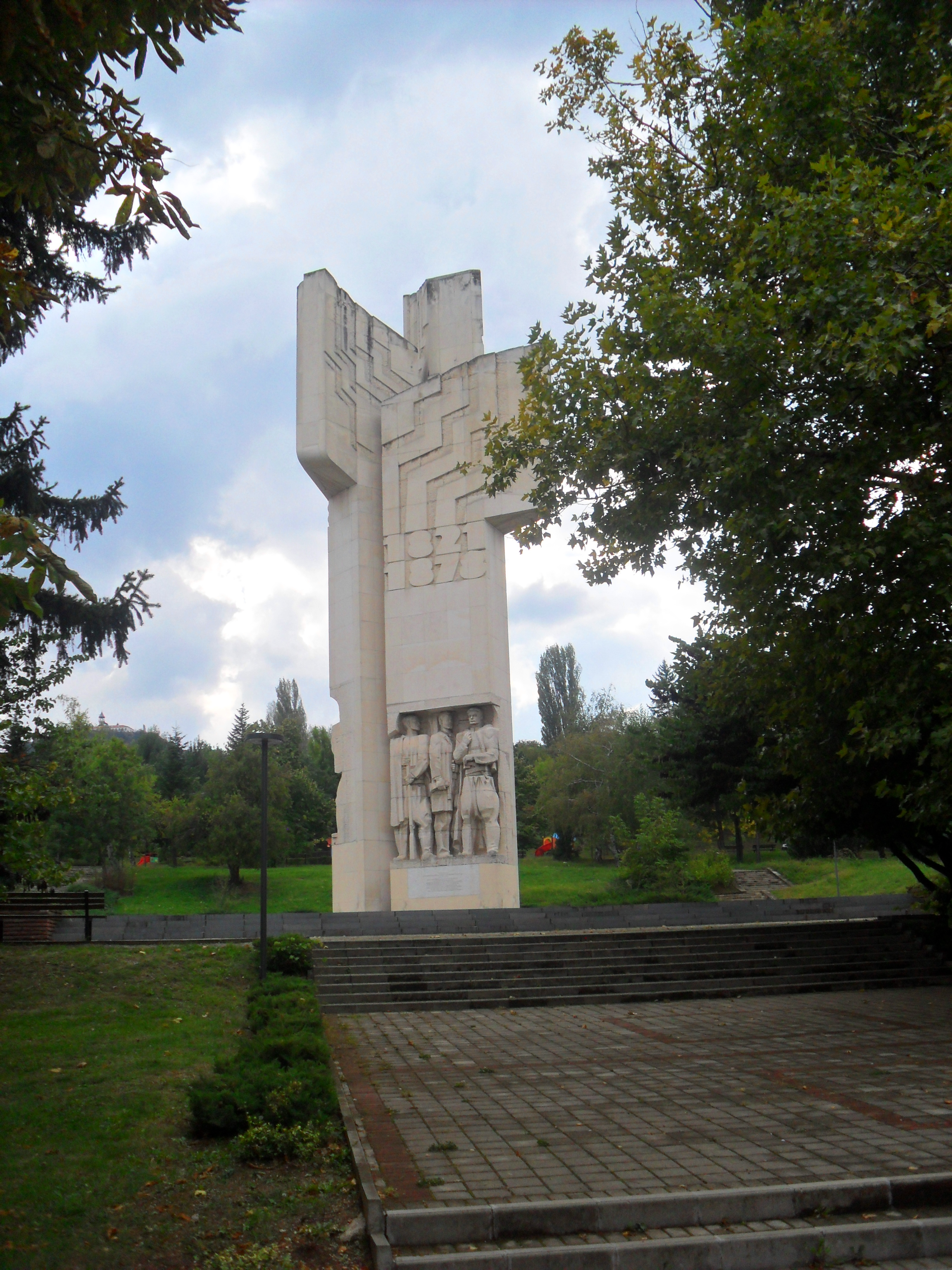
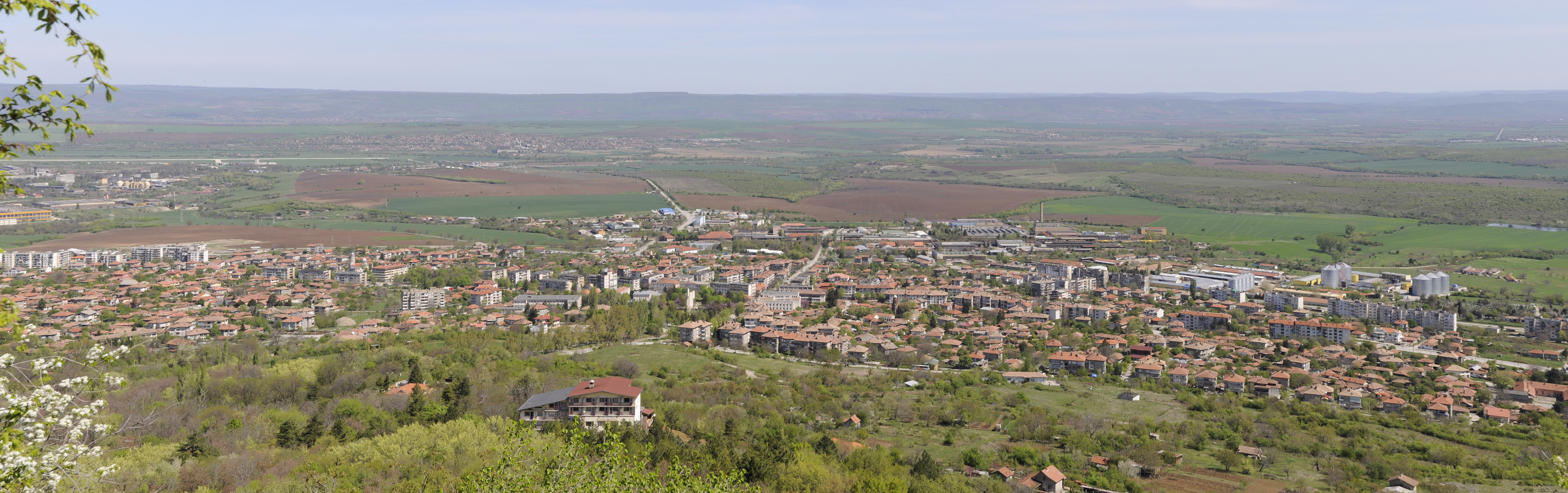
Panorama of Lyaskovets
