= Bogojevce =

- Village
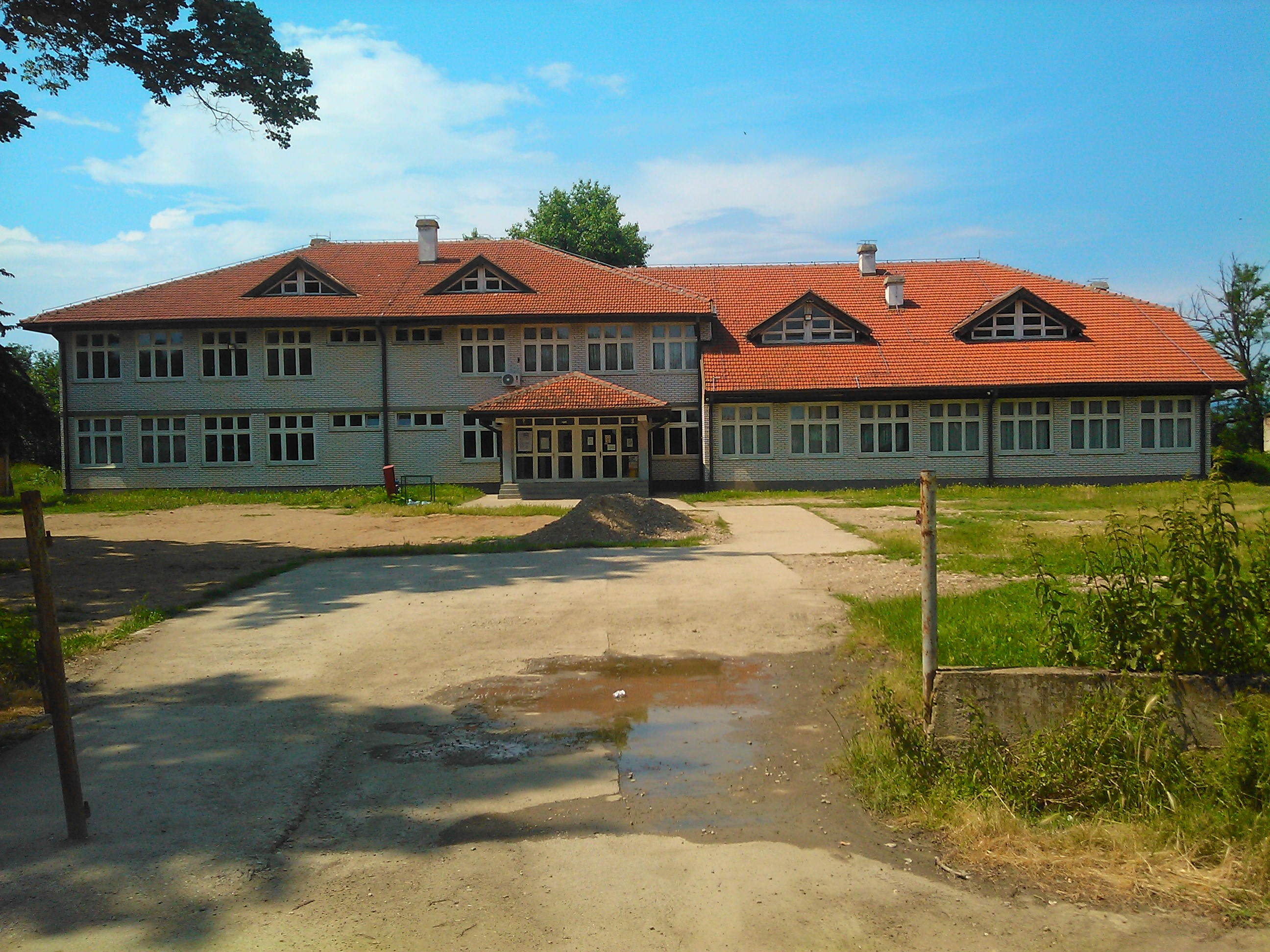
- Bogojevce

- Location within Serbia
- Coordinates: 43°02′59″N 21°58′08″E
- Country: Serbia
- District: Jablanica District
- Municipality: Leskovac

Population (2002)
  - Total: 1,571
- Time zone: UTC+1 (CET)
  - Summer (DST): UTC+2 (CEST)

Bogojevce is a village in the municipality of Leskovac, Serbia. According to the 2002 census, the village has a population of 1571 people.
