= Grajevce =

- Village
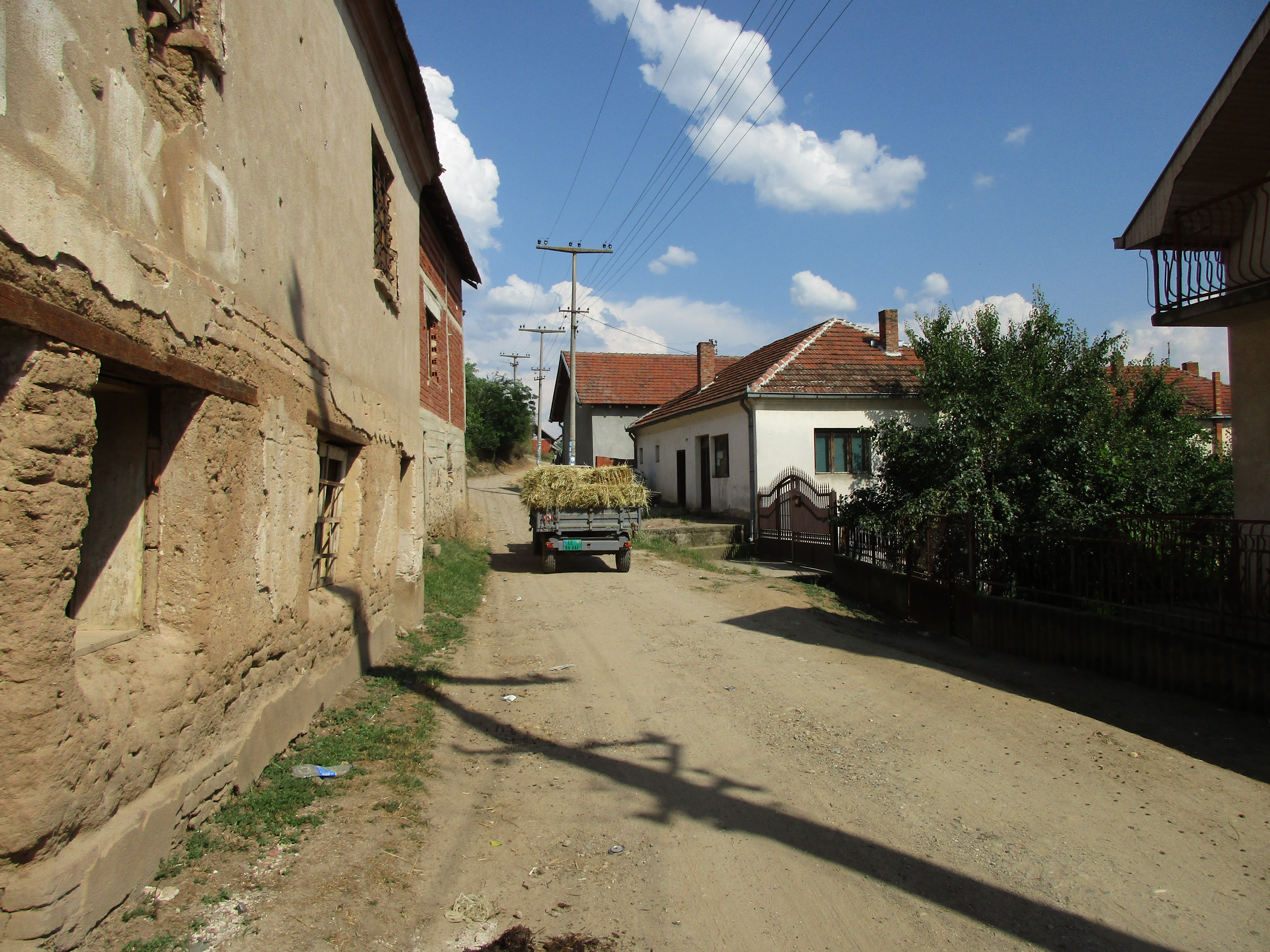

- Location within Serbia
- Coordinates: 43°02′48″N 21°59′42″E
- Country: Serbia
- District: Jablanica District
- Municipality: Leskovac
- Elevation: 833 ft (254 m)

Population (2002)
  - Total: 404
- Time zone: UTC+1 (CET)
  - Summer (DST): UTC+2 (CEST)

Grajevce is a village in the municipality of Leskovac, Serbia. According to the 2002 census, the village has a population of 404 people.

== Gallery ==
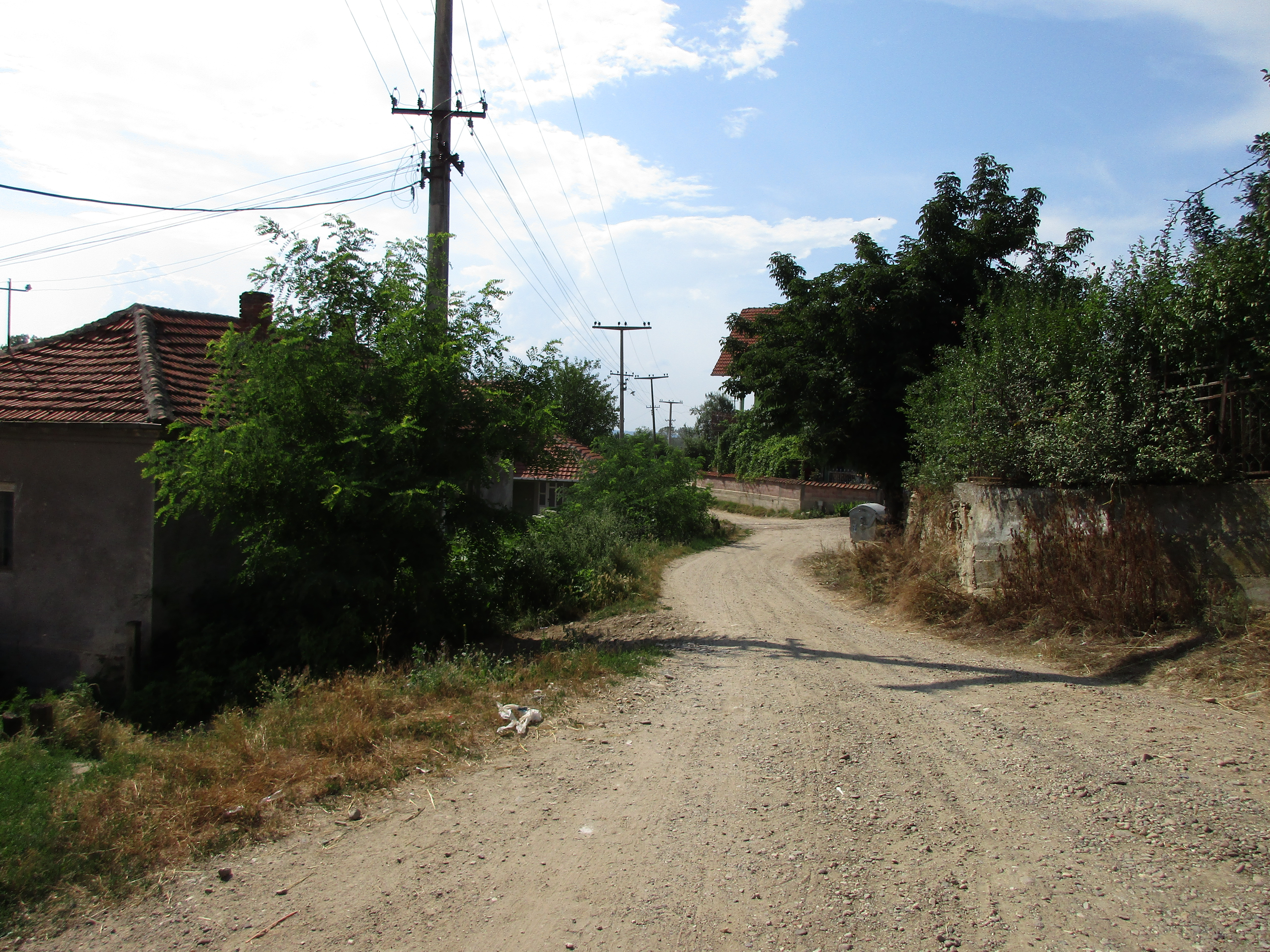
A street in the village.

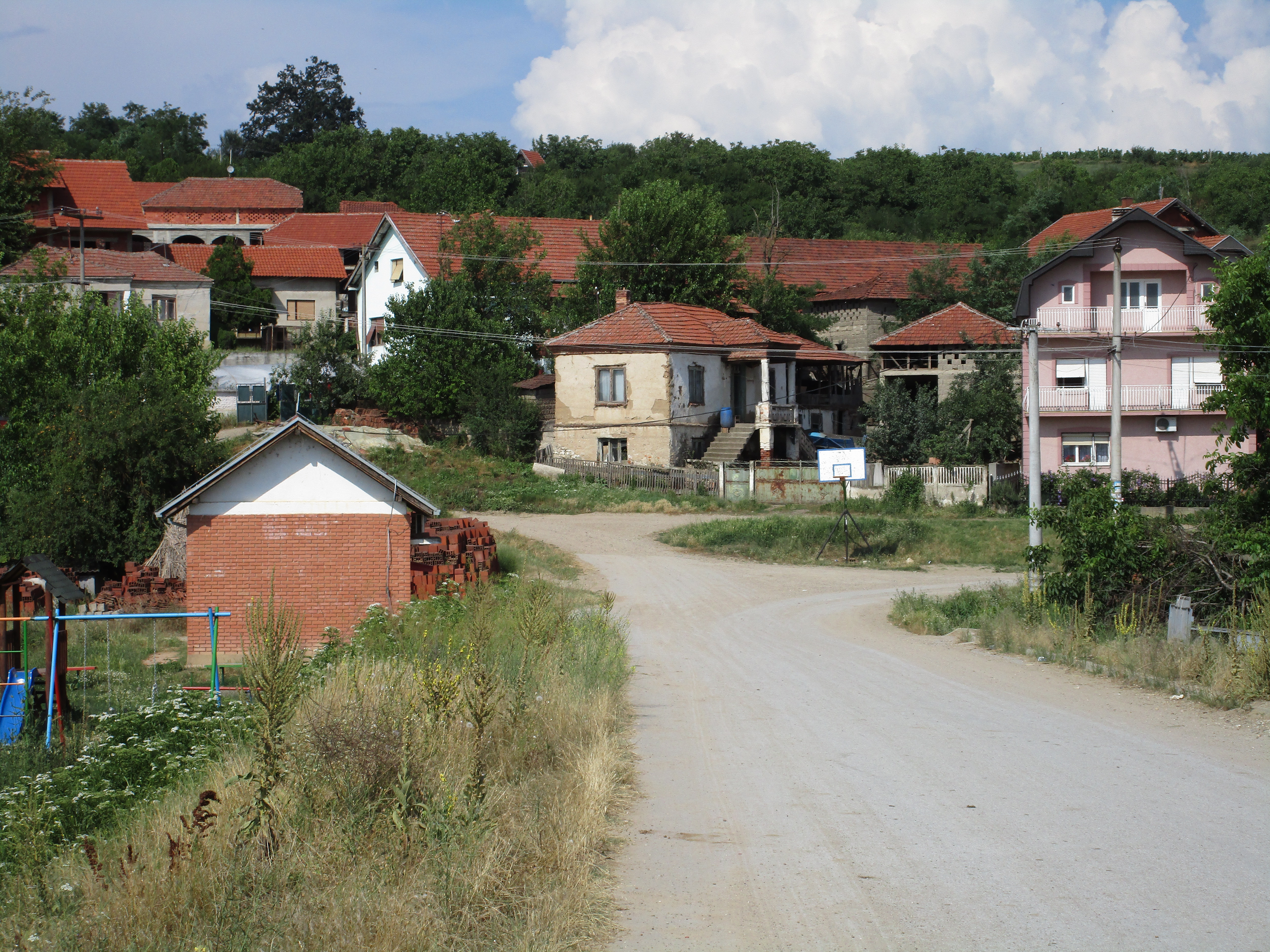

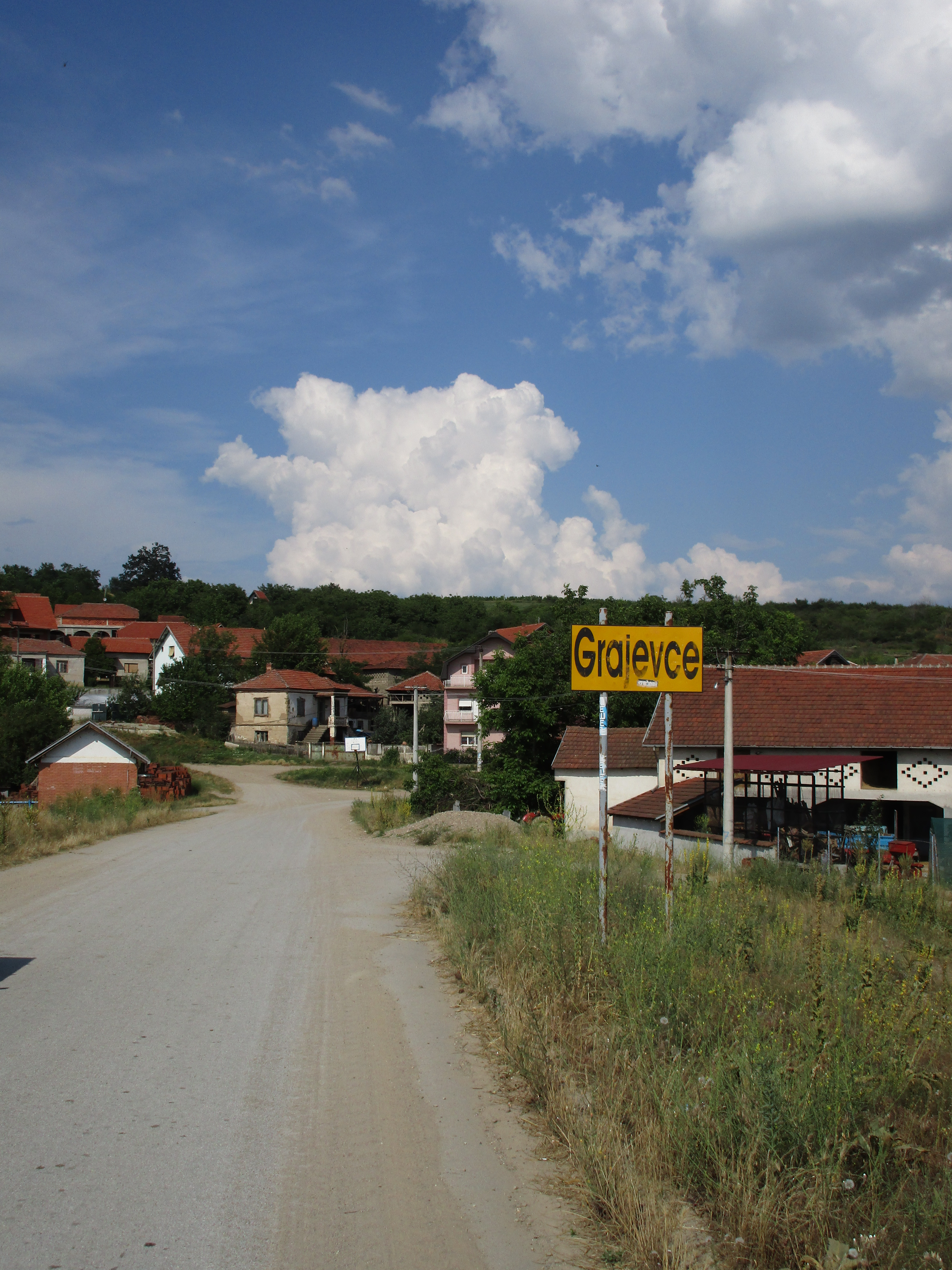

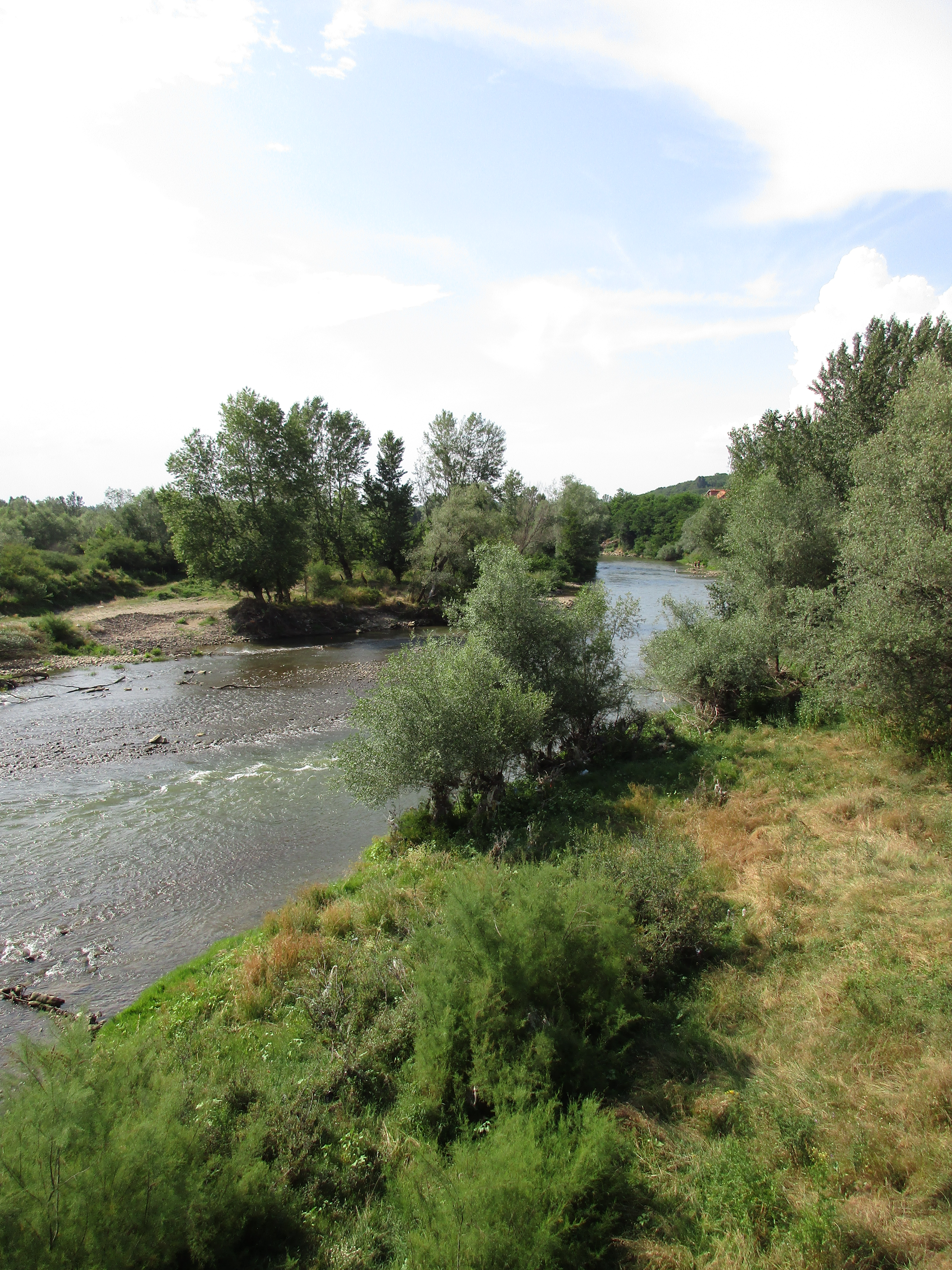
Juzna Morava river.

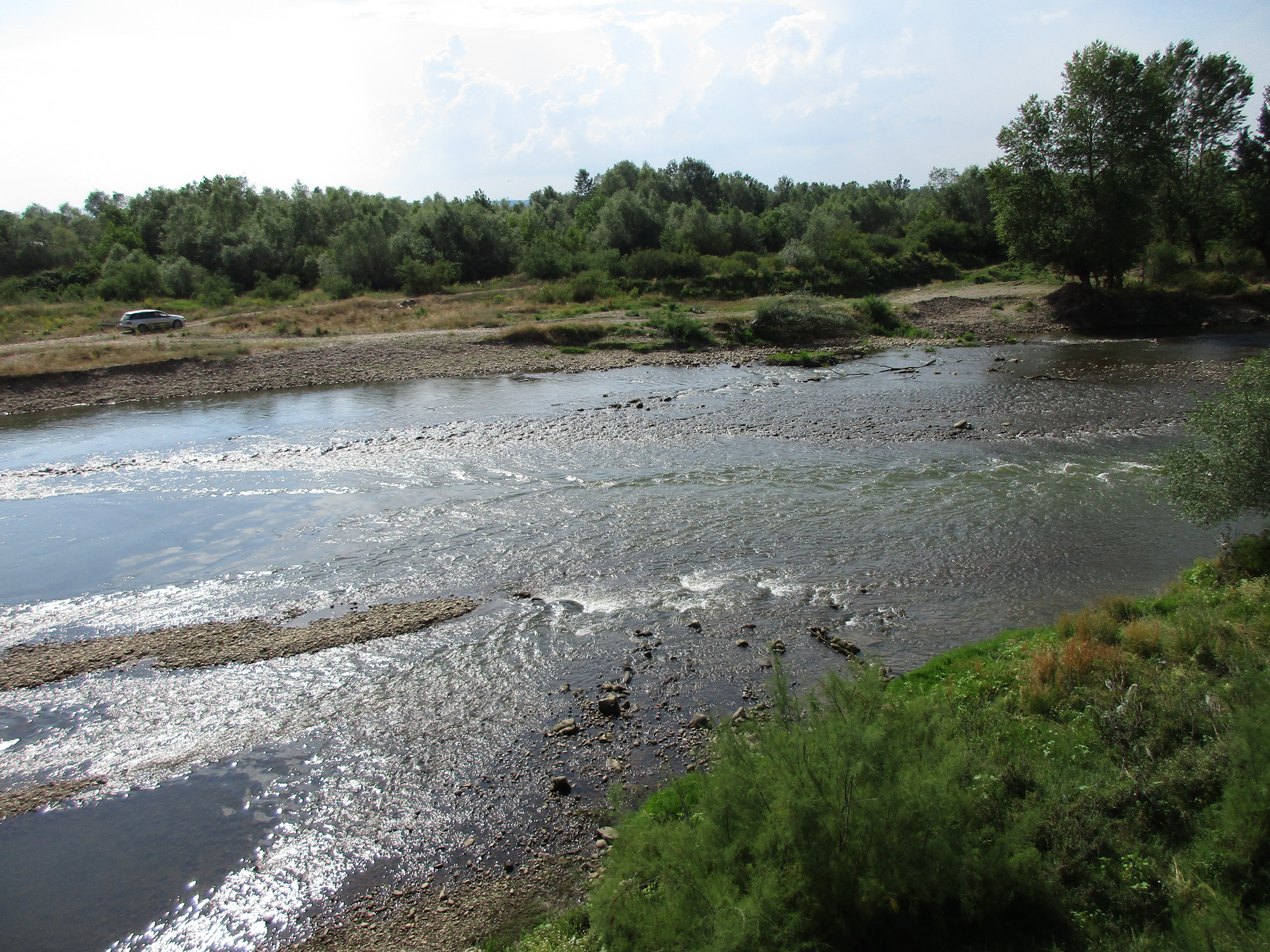
Juzna Morava river.

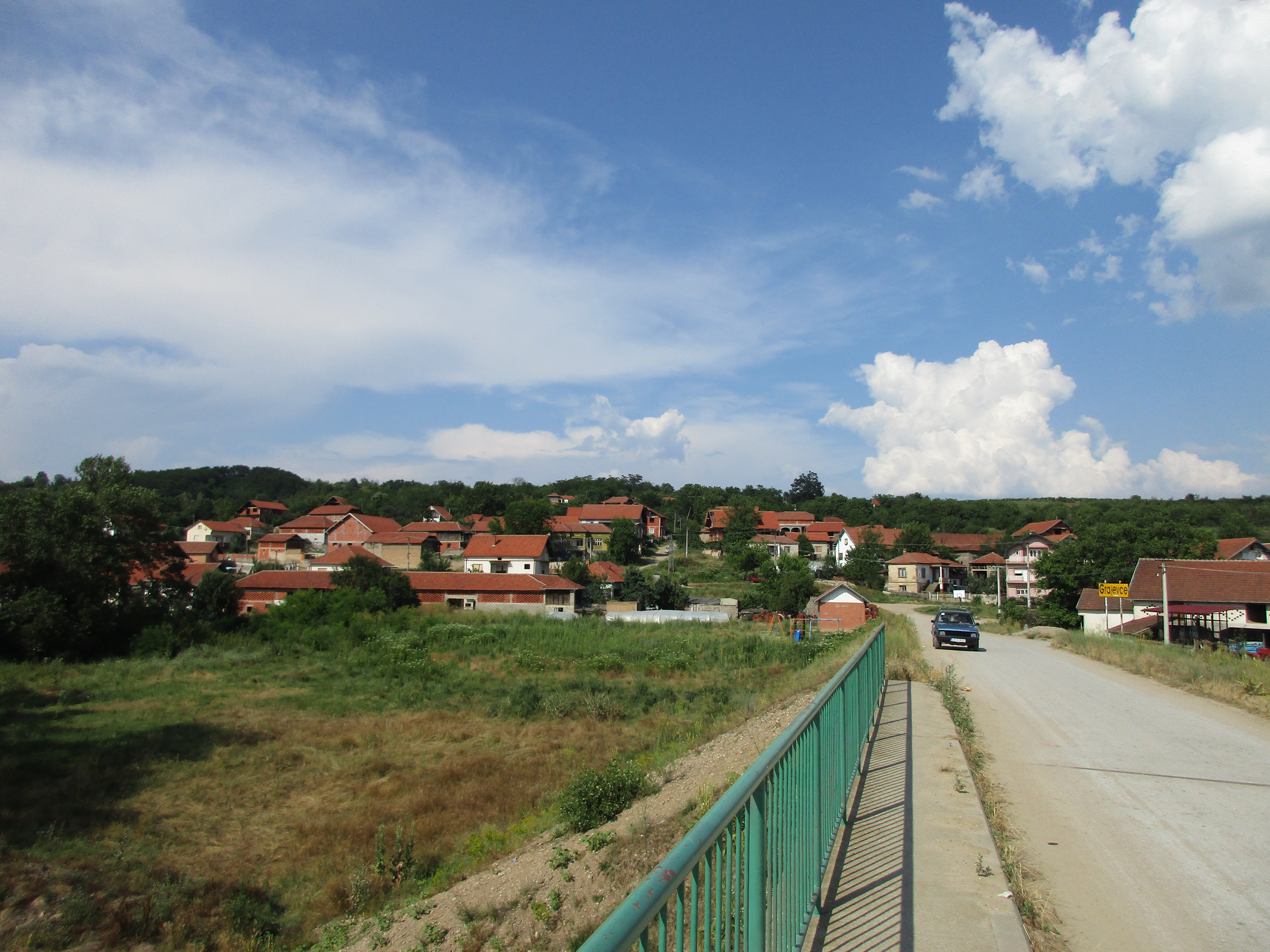

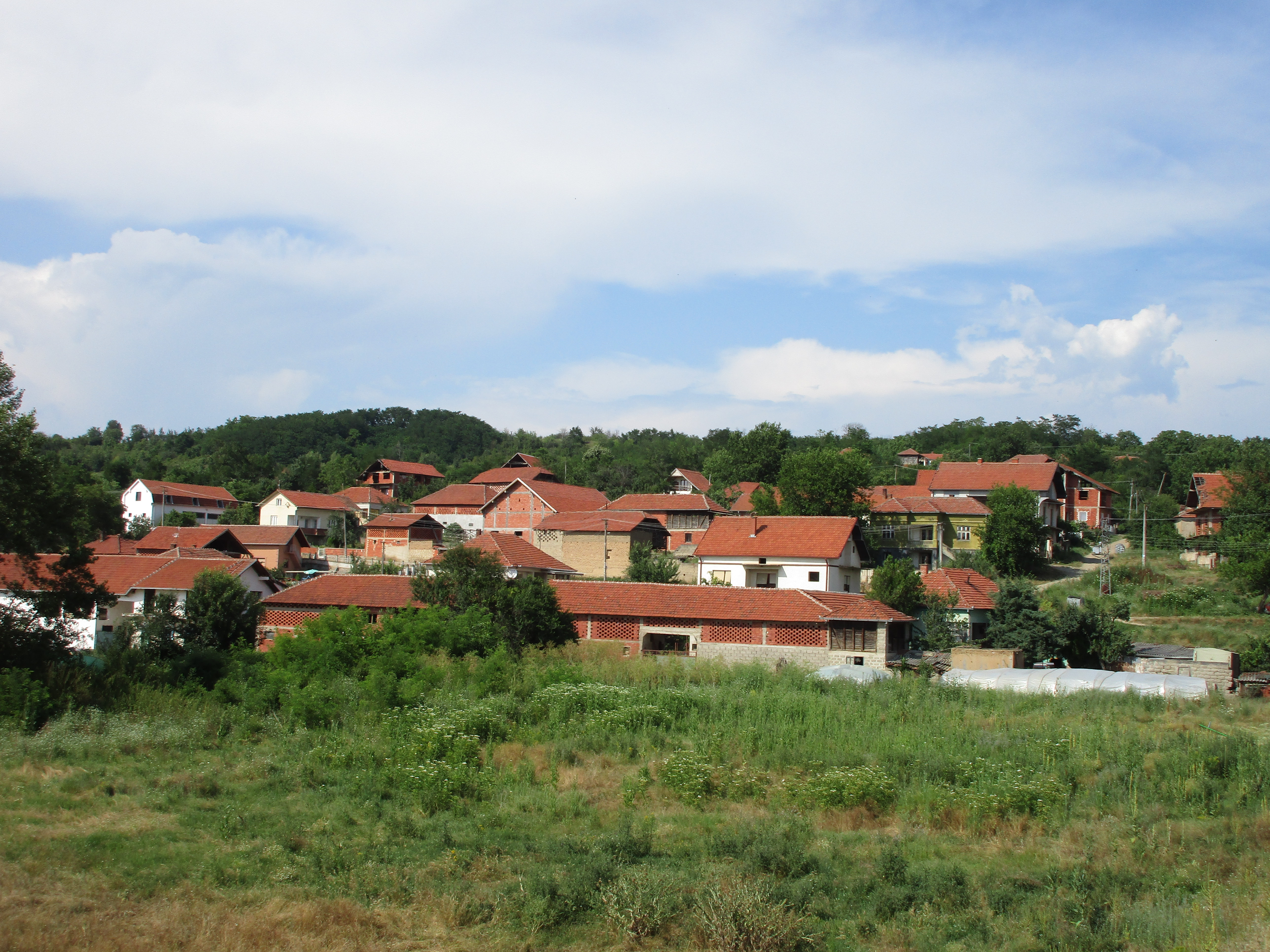

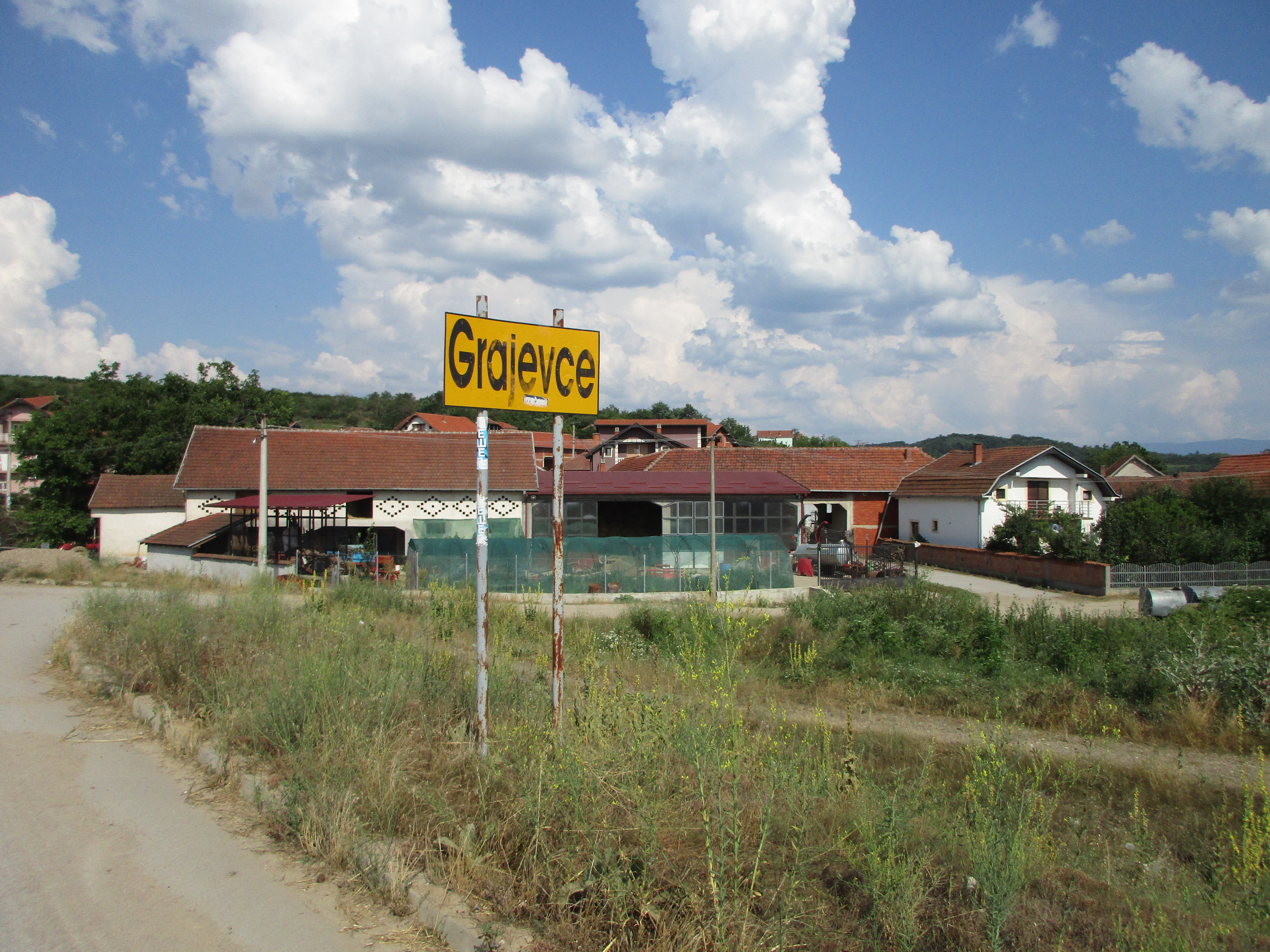

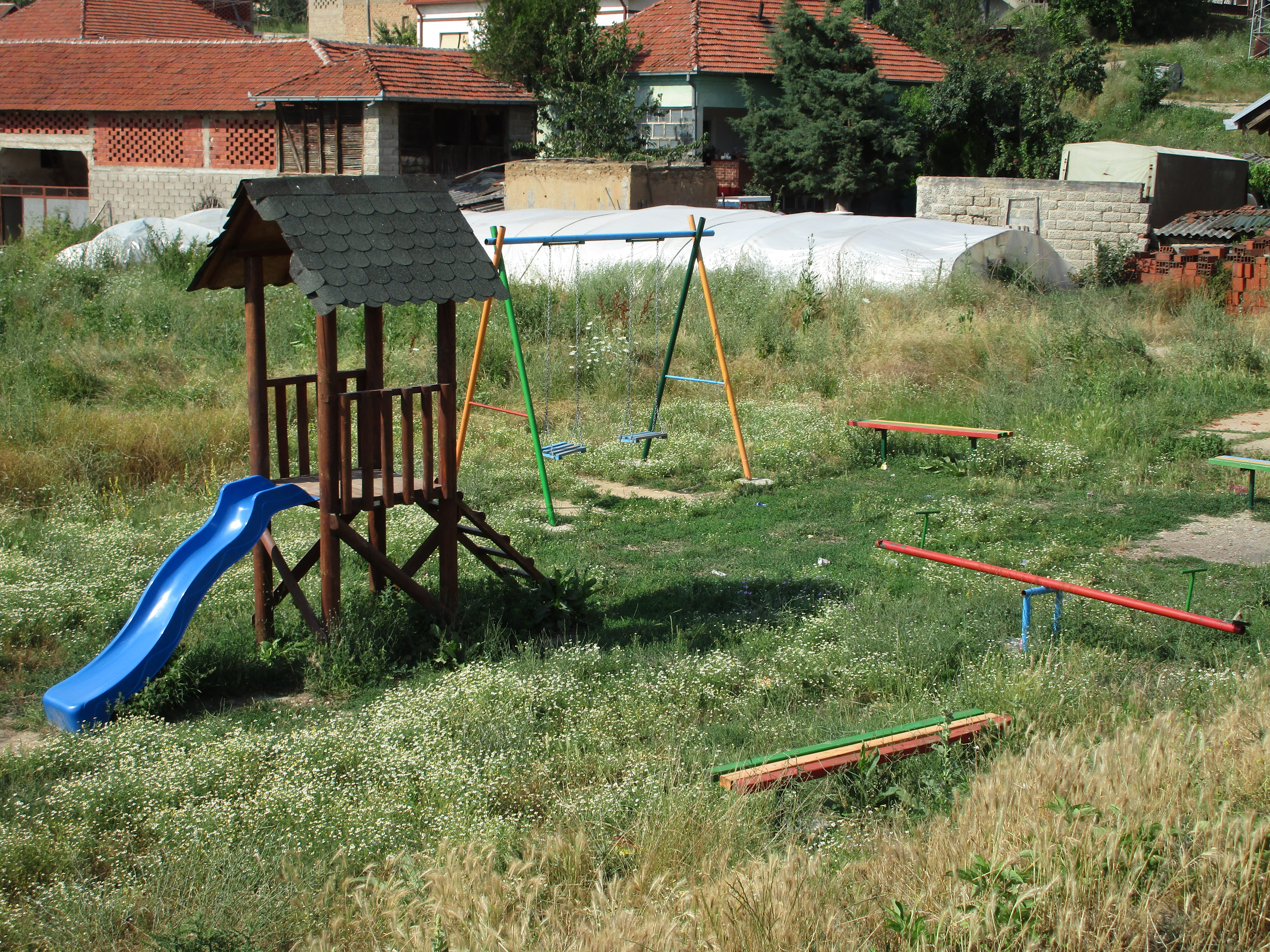

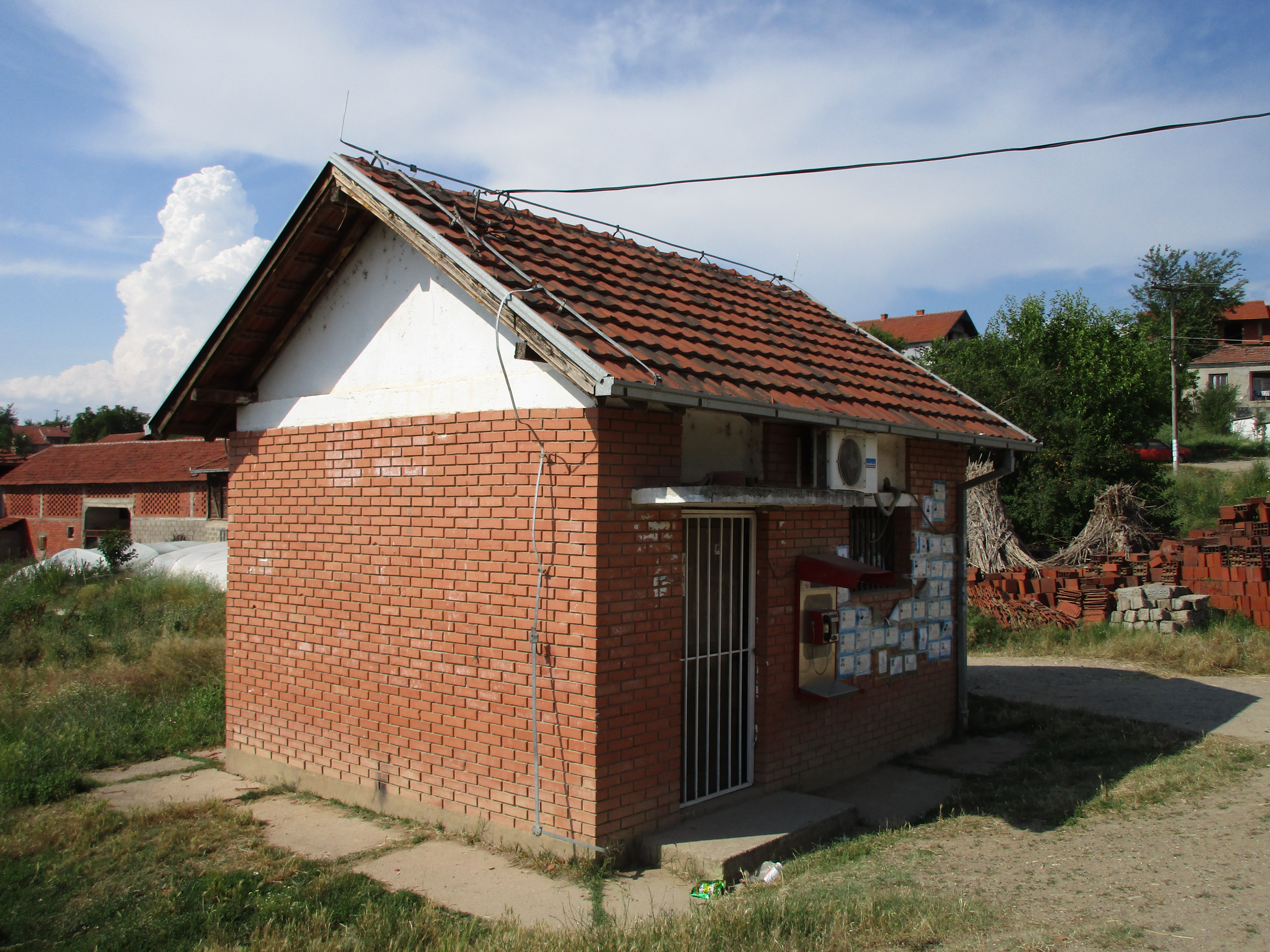

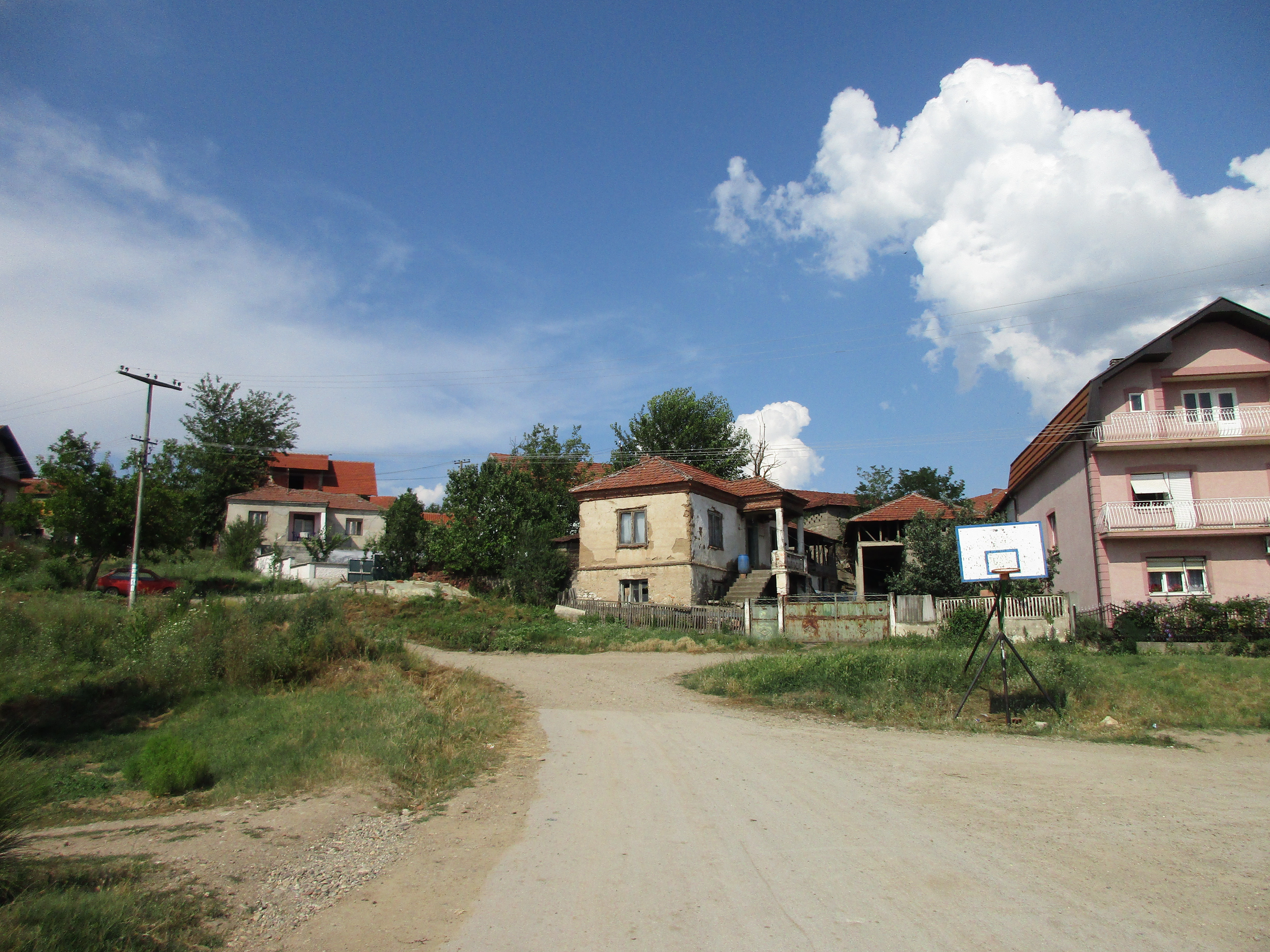

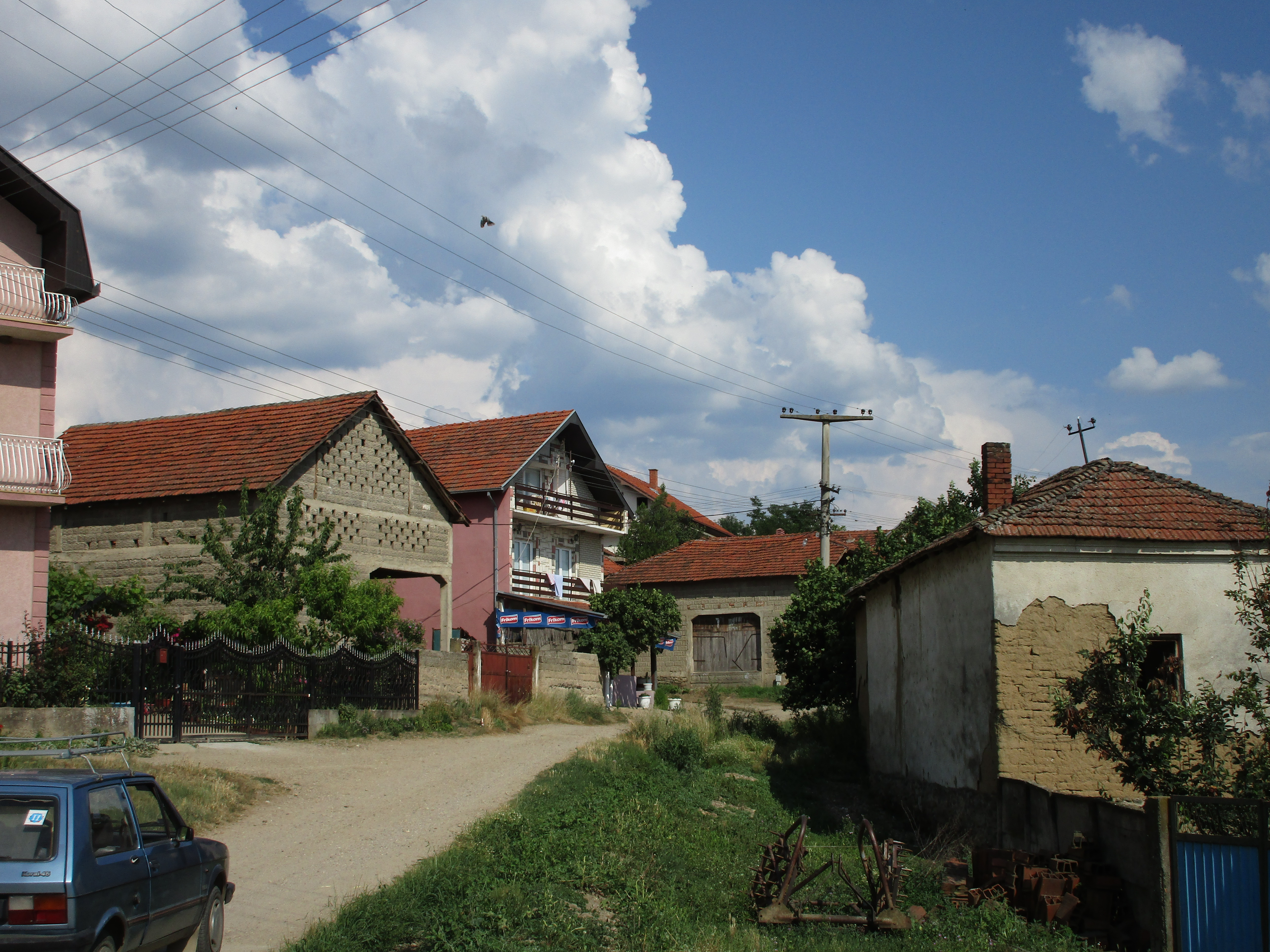

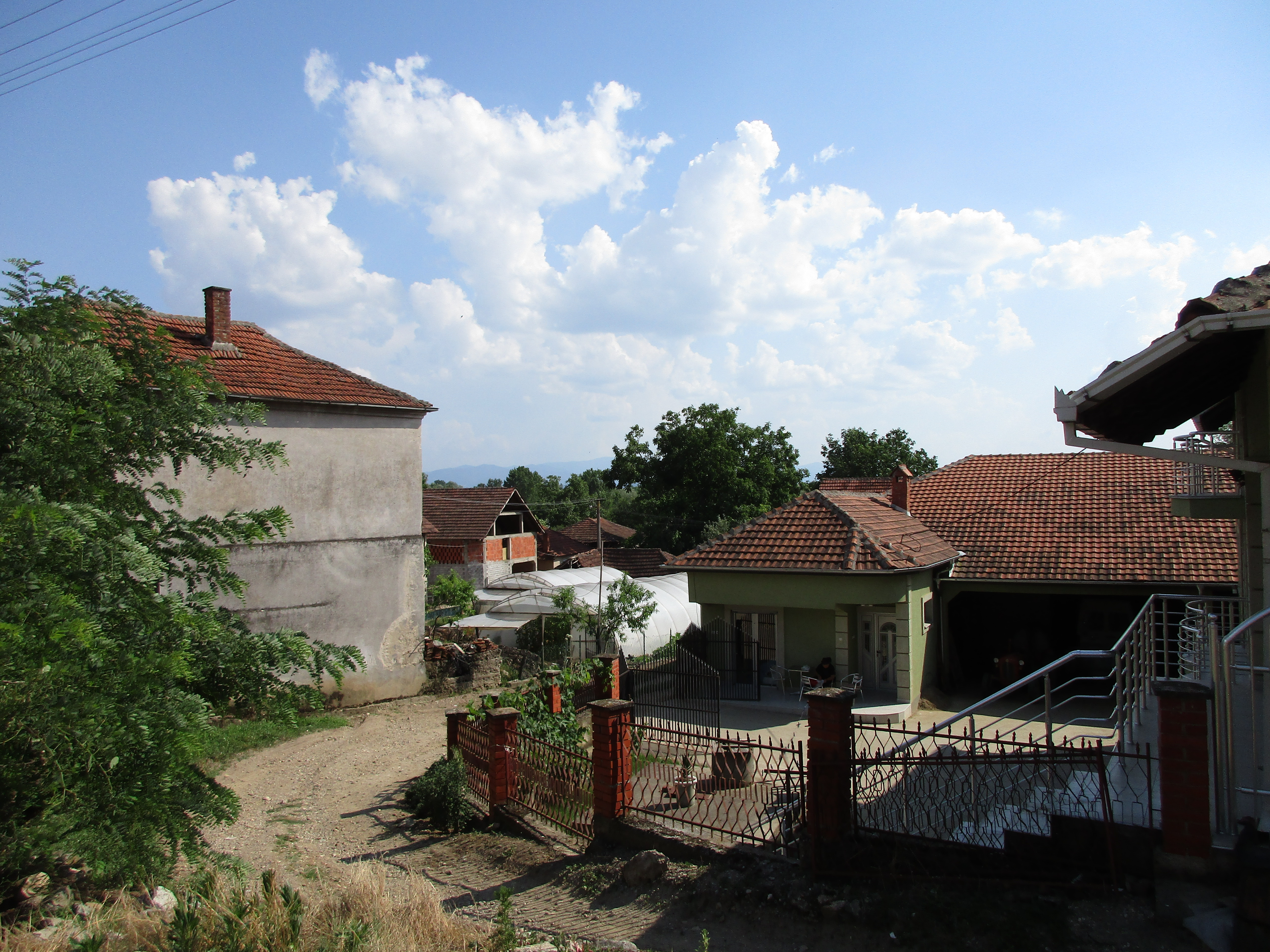
