= Gornja Bunuša =

- Village
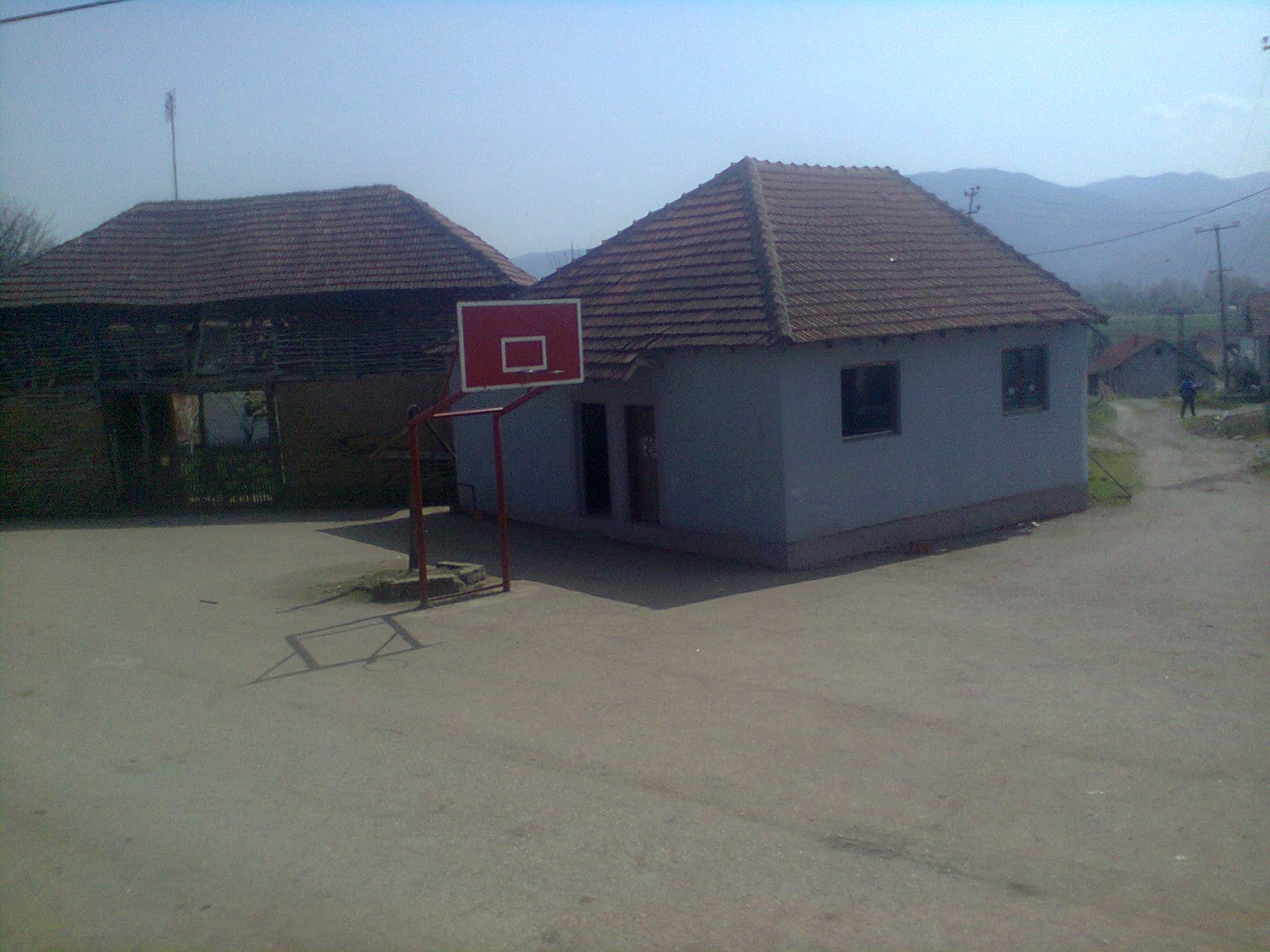

- Location within Serbia
- Country: Serbia
- District: Jablanica District
- Municipality: Leskovac
- Elevation: 876 ft (267 m)

Population (2002)
  - Total: 633
- Time zone: UTC+1 (CET)
  - Summer (DST): UTC+2 (CEST)

Gornja Bunuša is a village in the municipality of Leskovac, Serbia. According to the 2002 census, the village has a population of 633 people.
