= Nakrivanj =

- Village
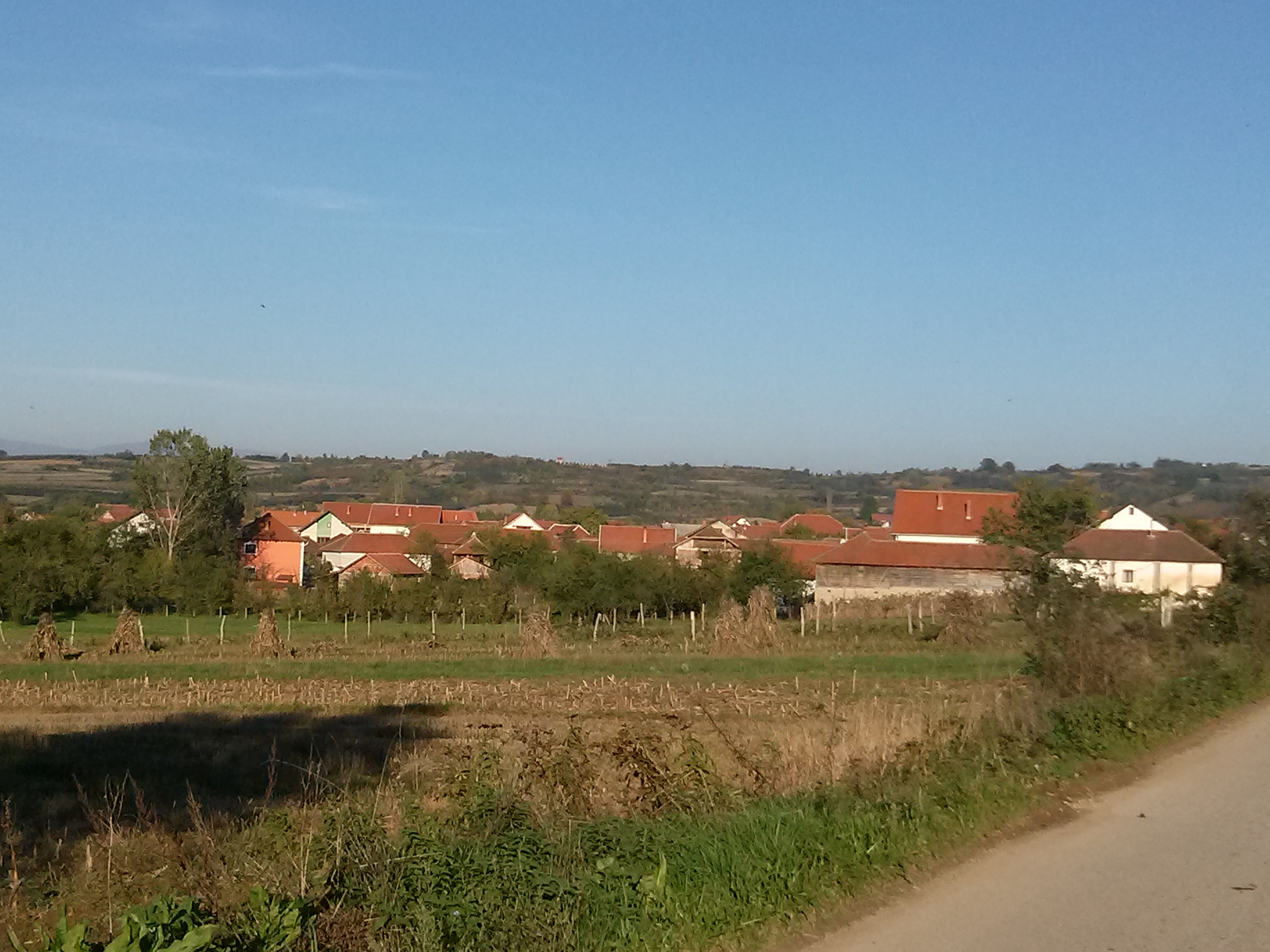

- Location within Serbia
- Coordinates: 42°52′58″N 21°56′36″E
- Country: Serbia
- District: Jablanica District
- Municipality: Leskovac

Population (2002)
  - Total: 1,315
- Time zone: UTC+1 (CET)
  - Summer (DST): UTC+2 (CEST)

Nakrivanj is a village in the municipality of Leskovac, Serbia. According to the 2002 census, the village has a population of 1315 people.

== Gallery ==
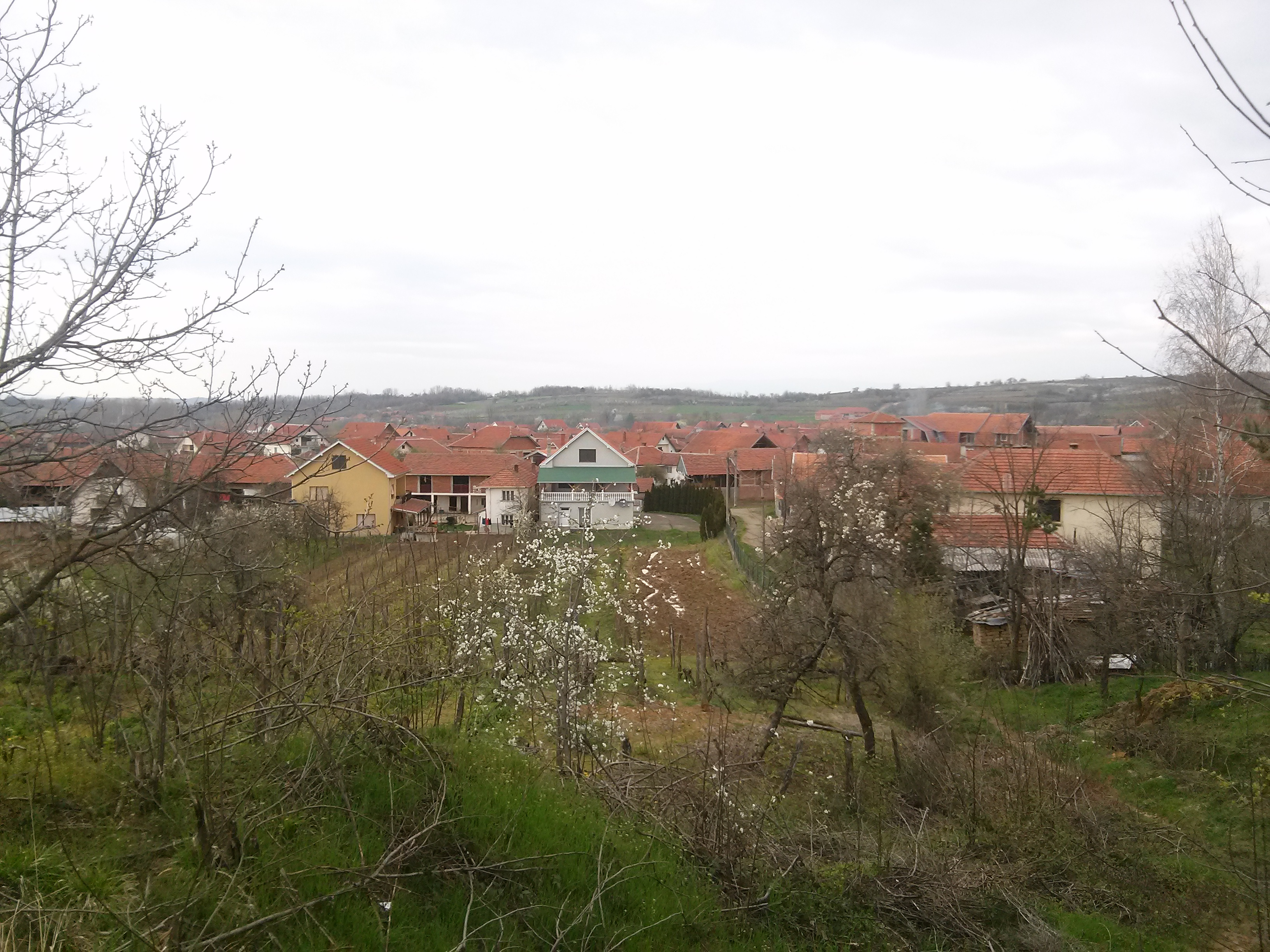
Panorama of the village.

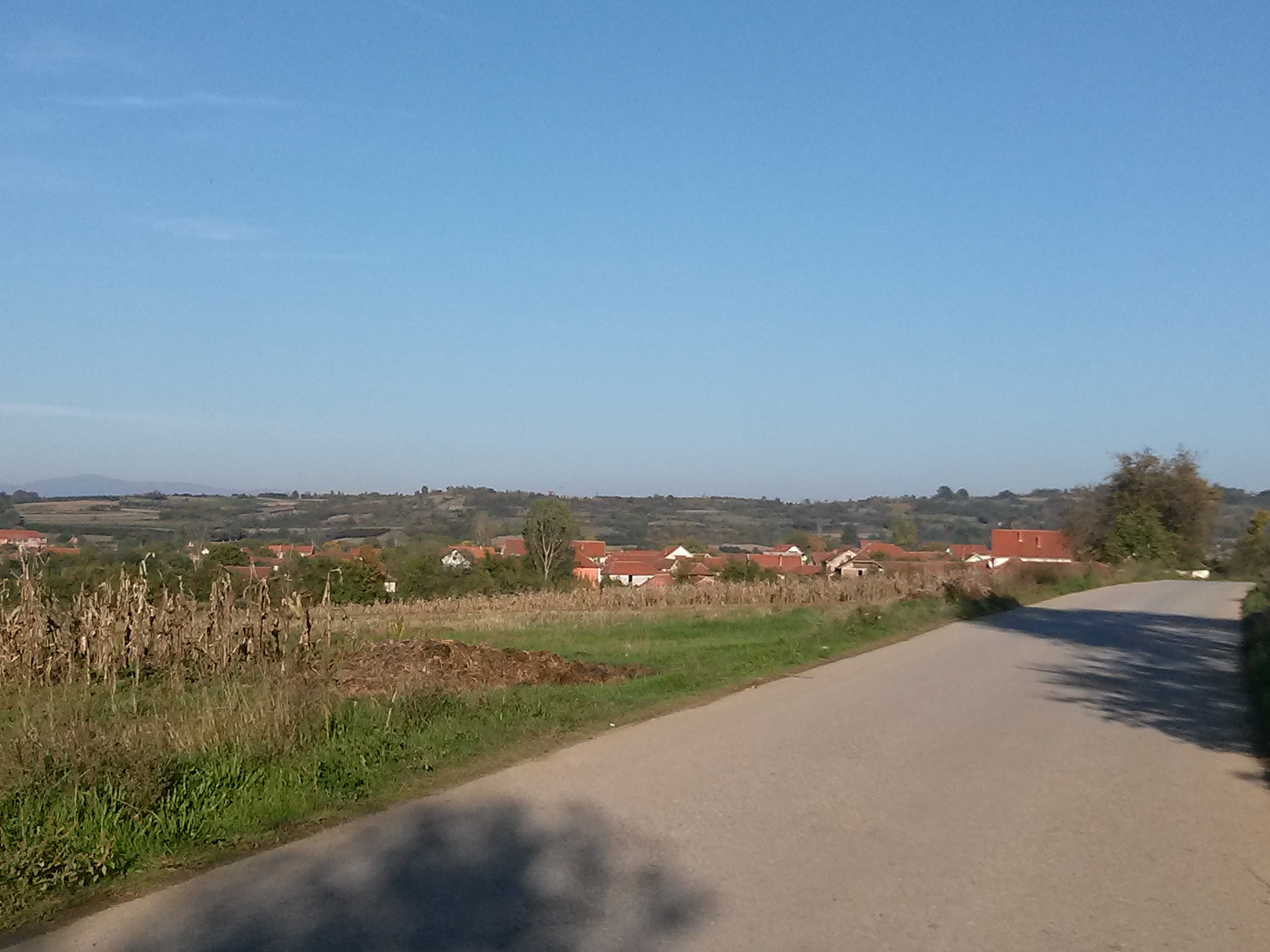
Panorama of the village.

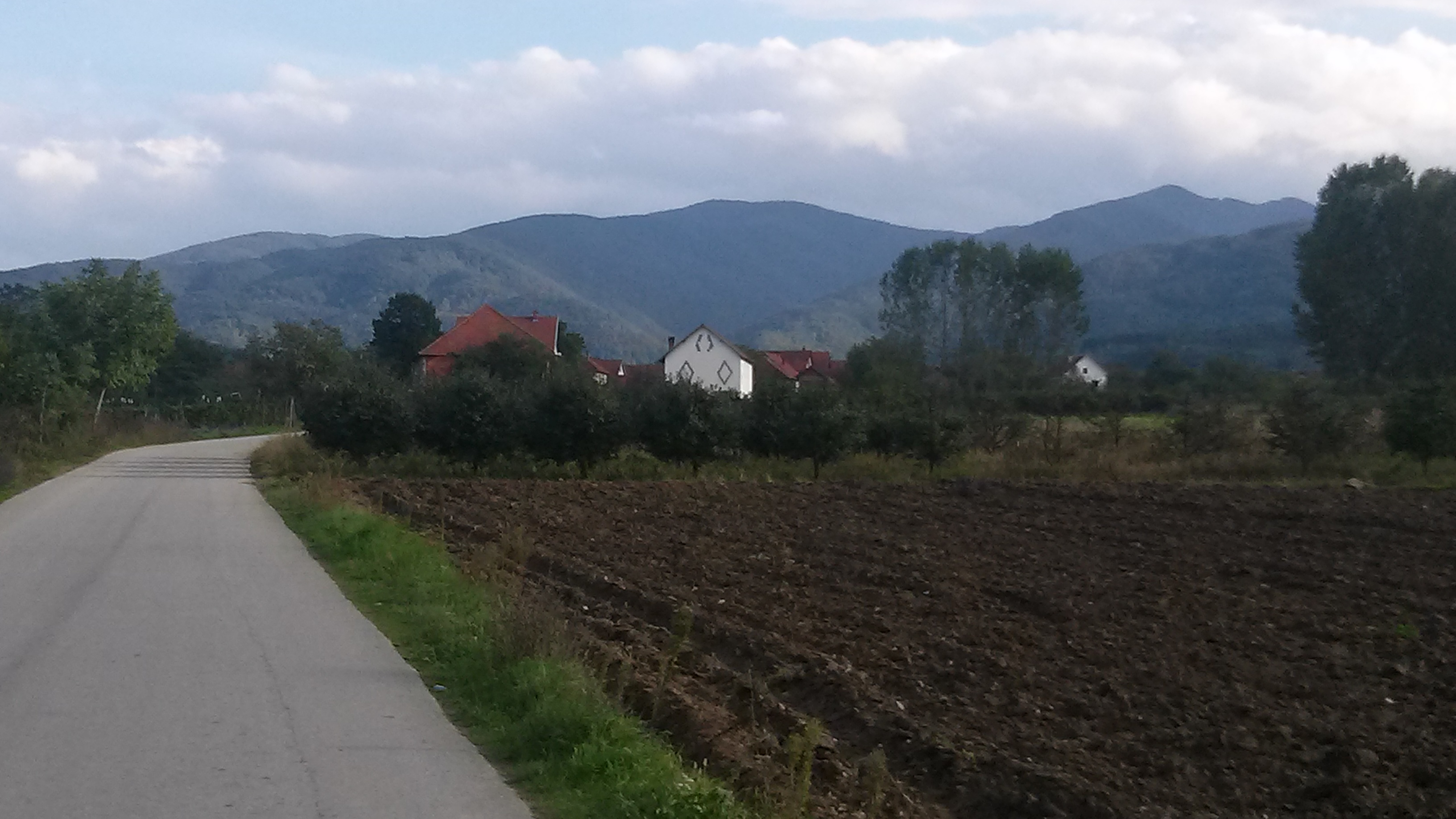
Panorama of the village.

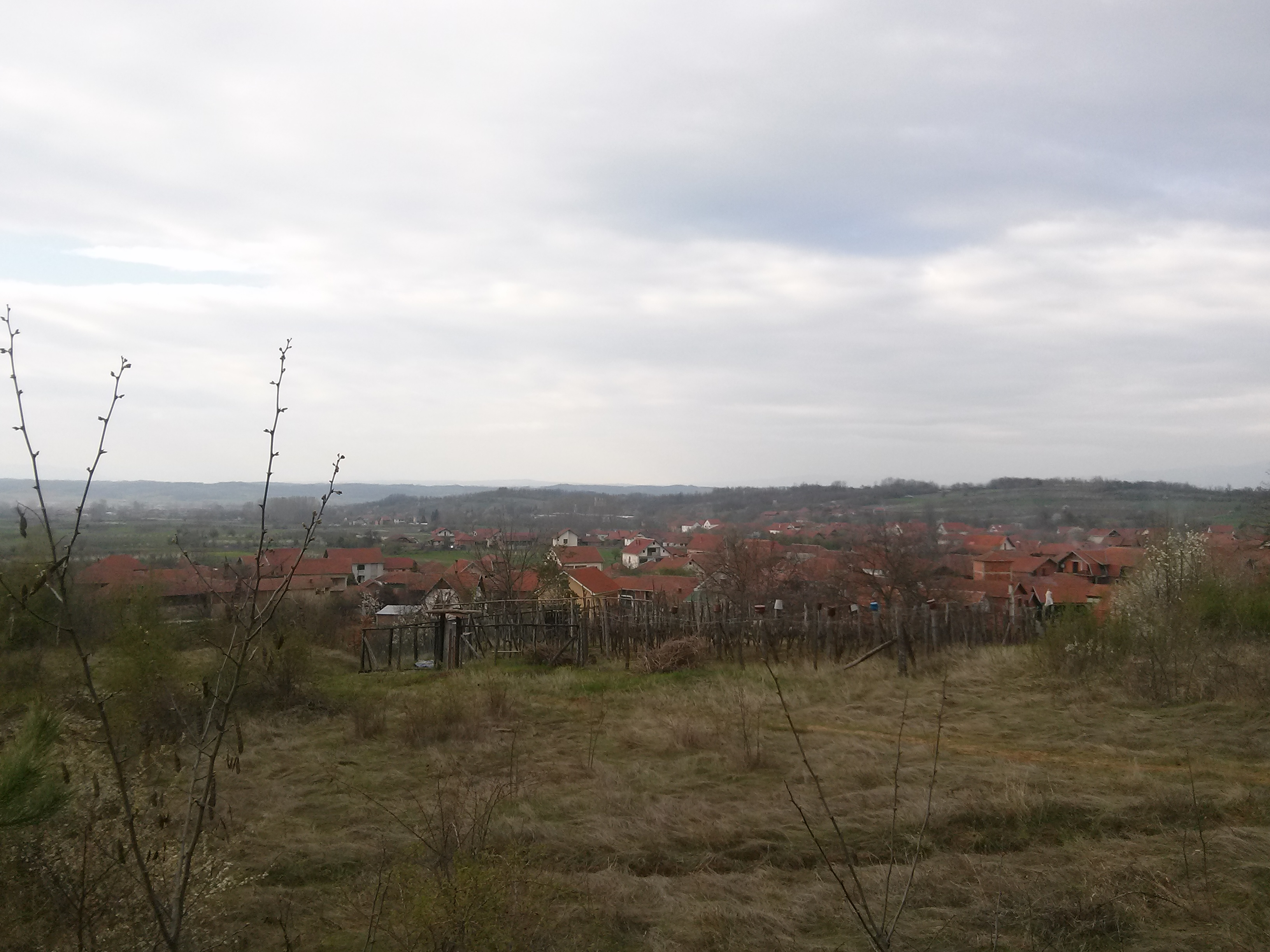
Panorama of the village.

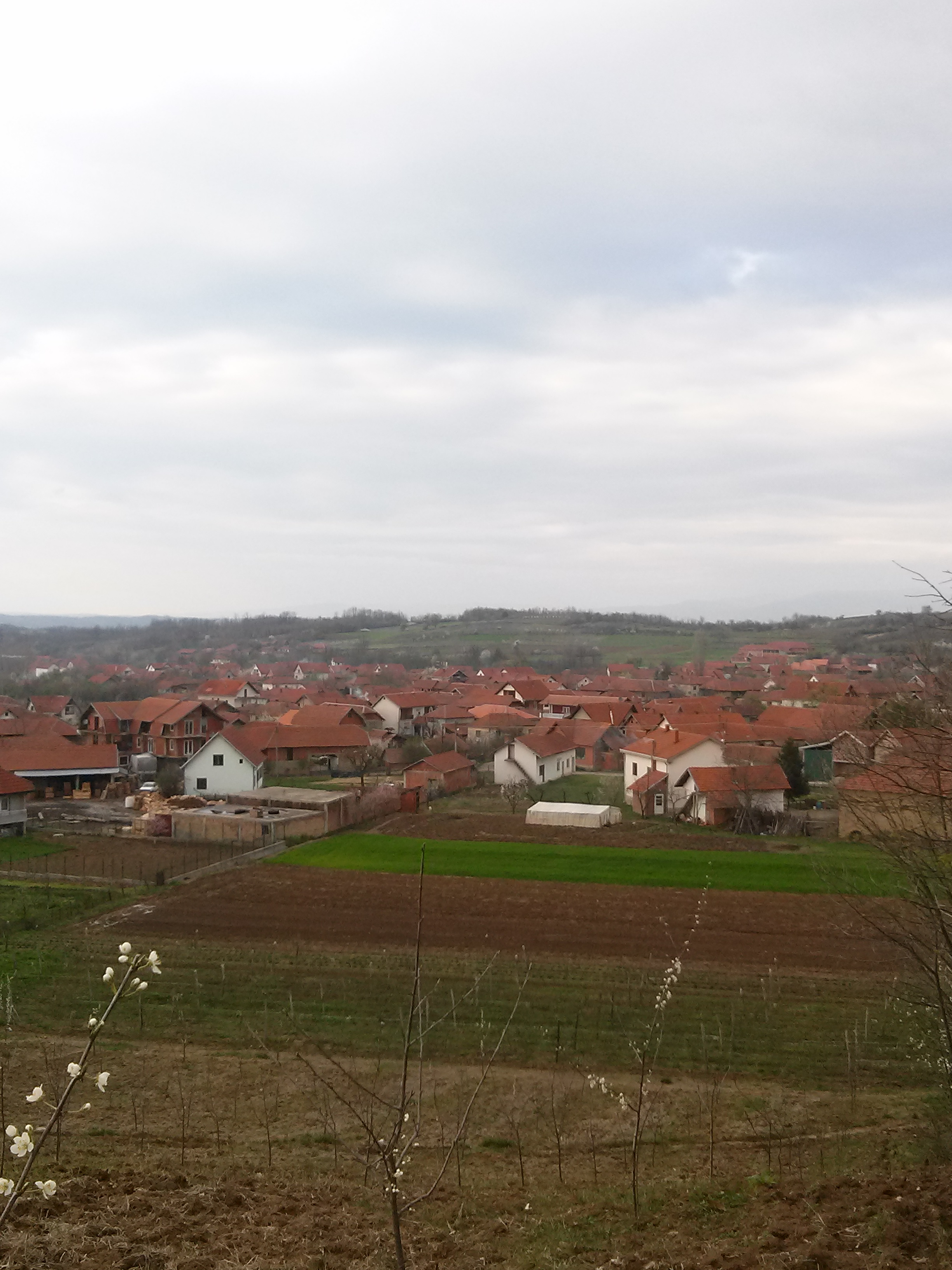
Panorama of the village.

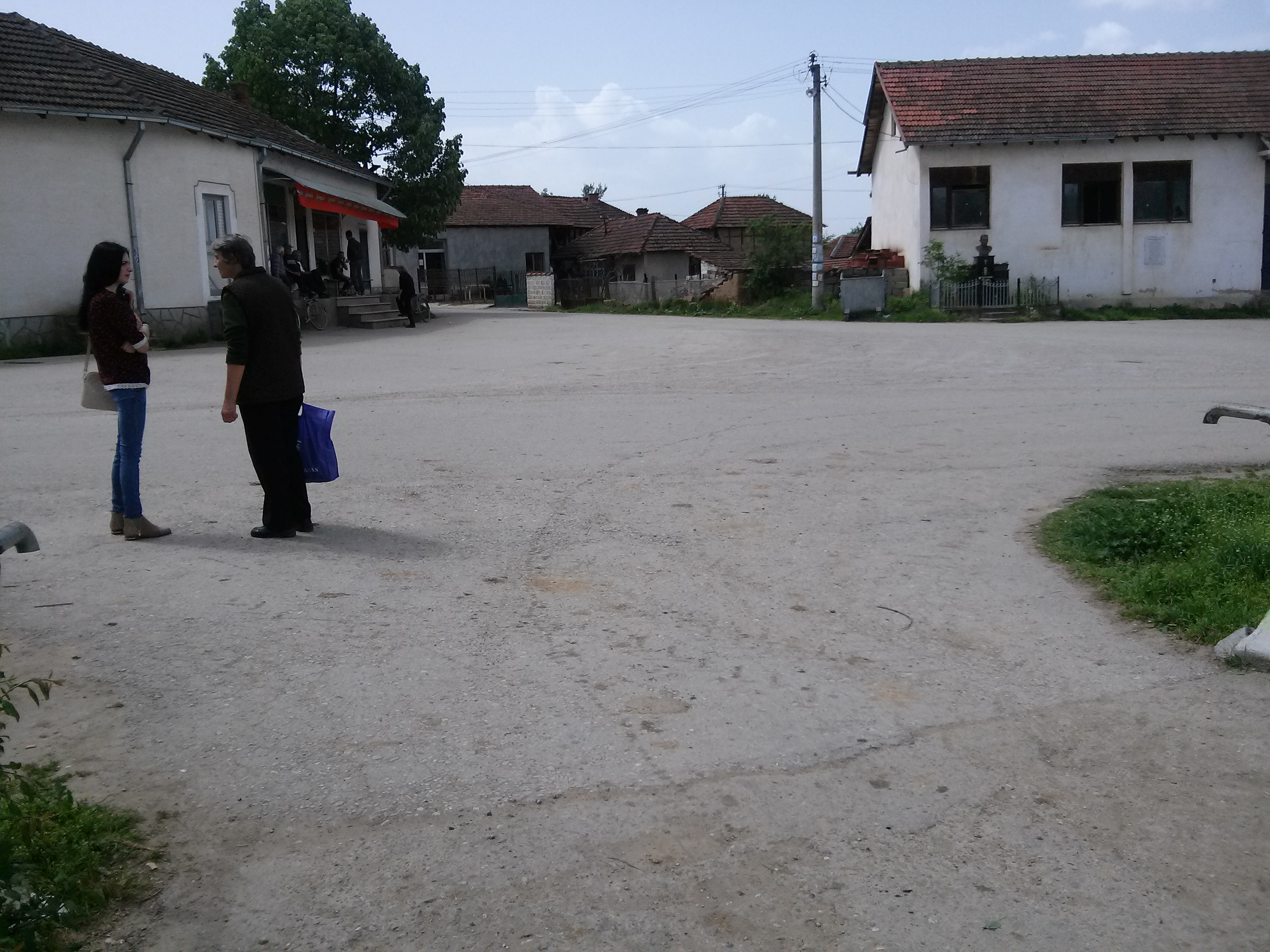
A central place in the village.

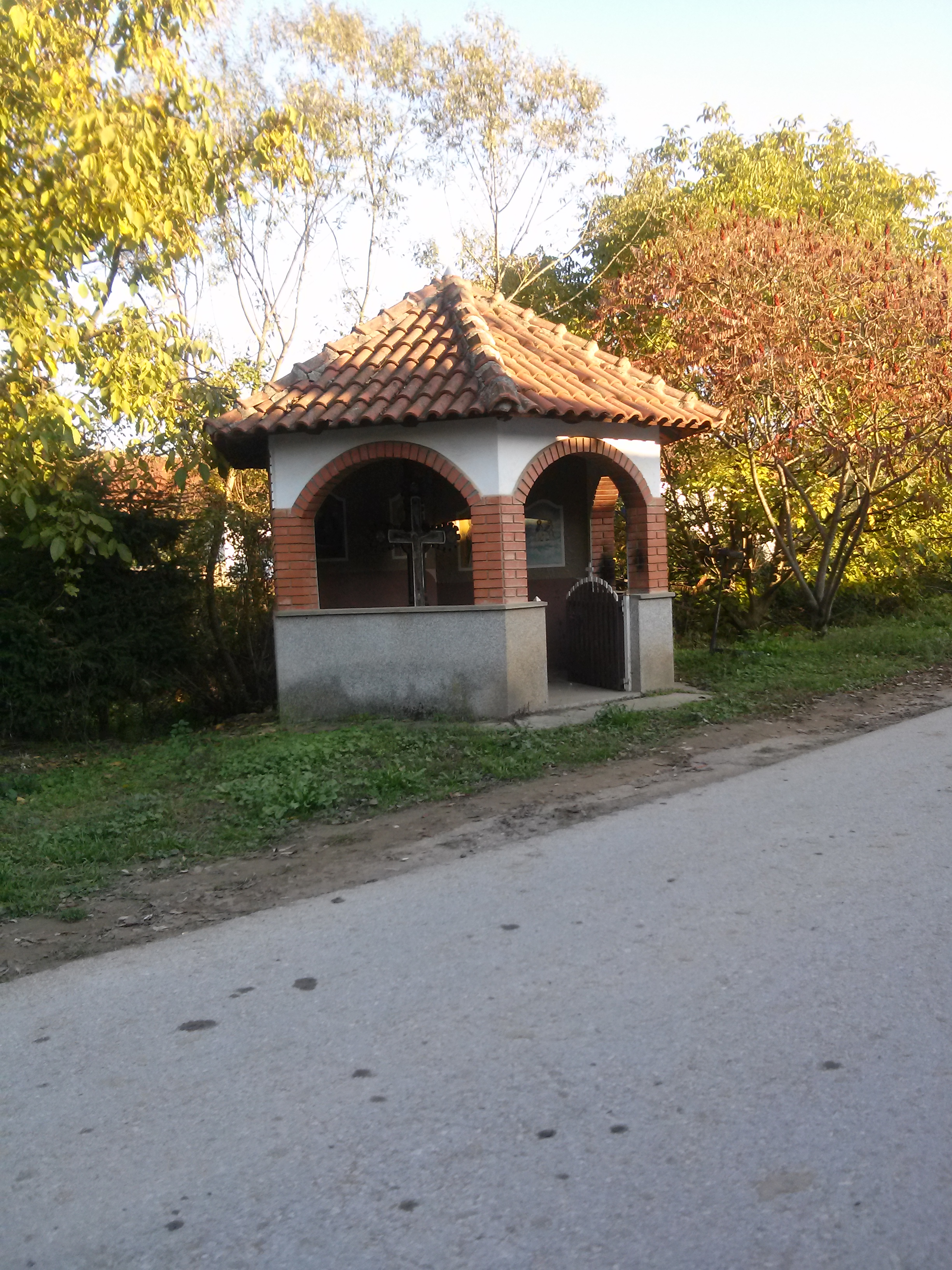
Orthodox cross.

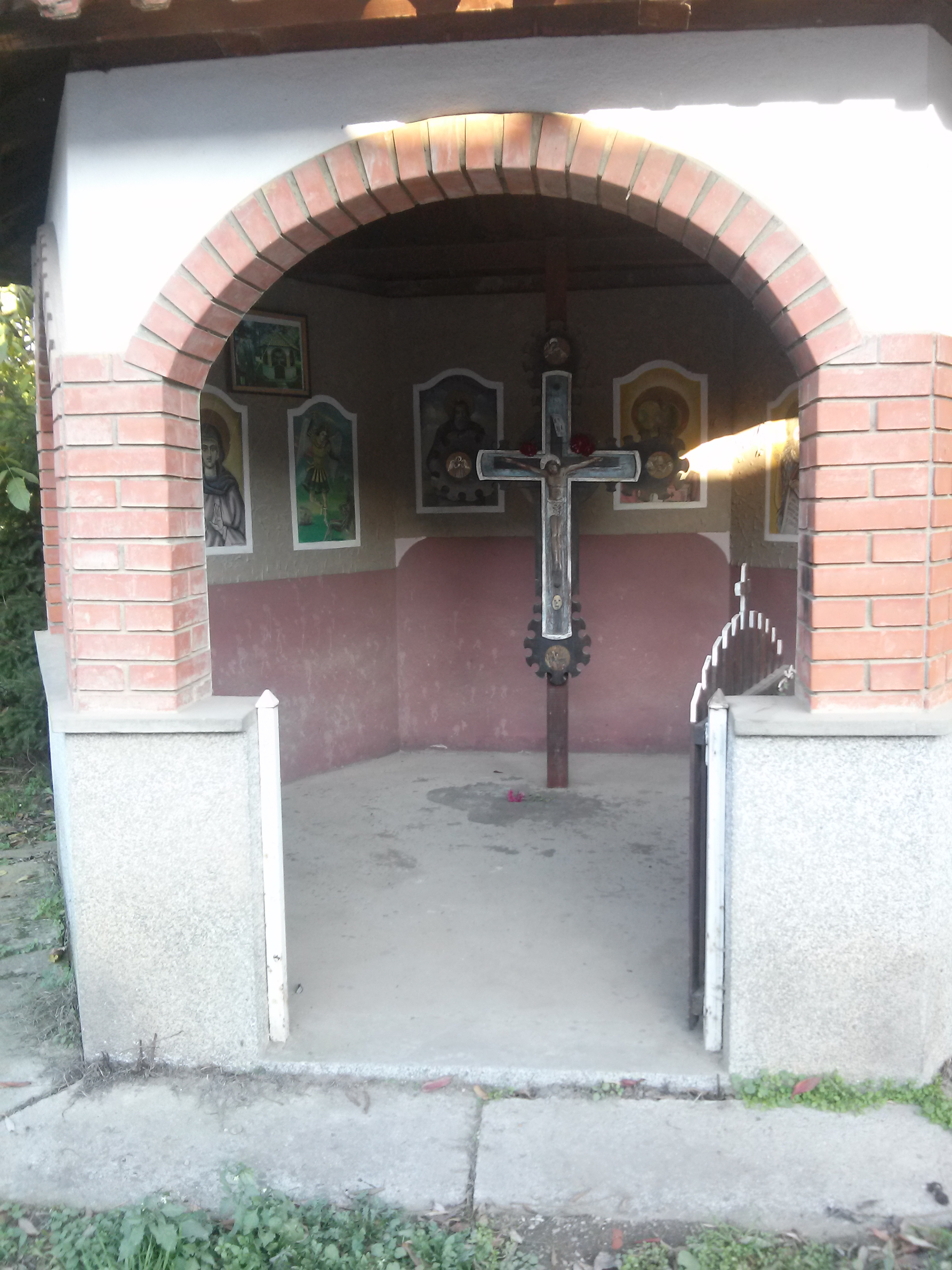
Orthodox cross.

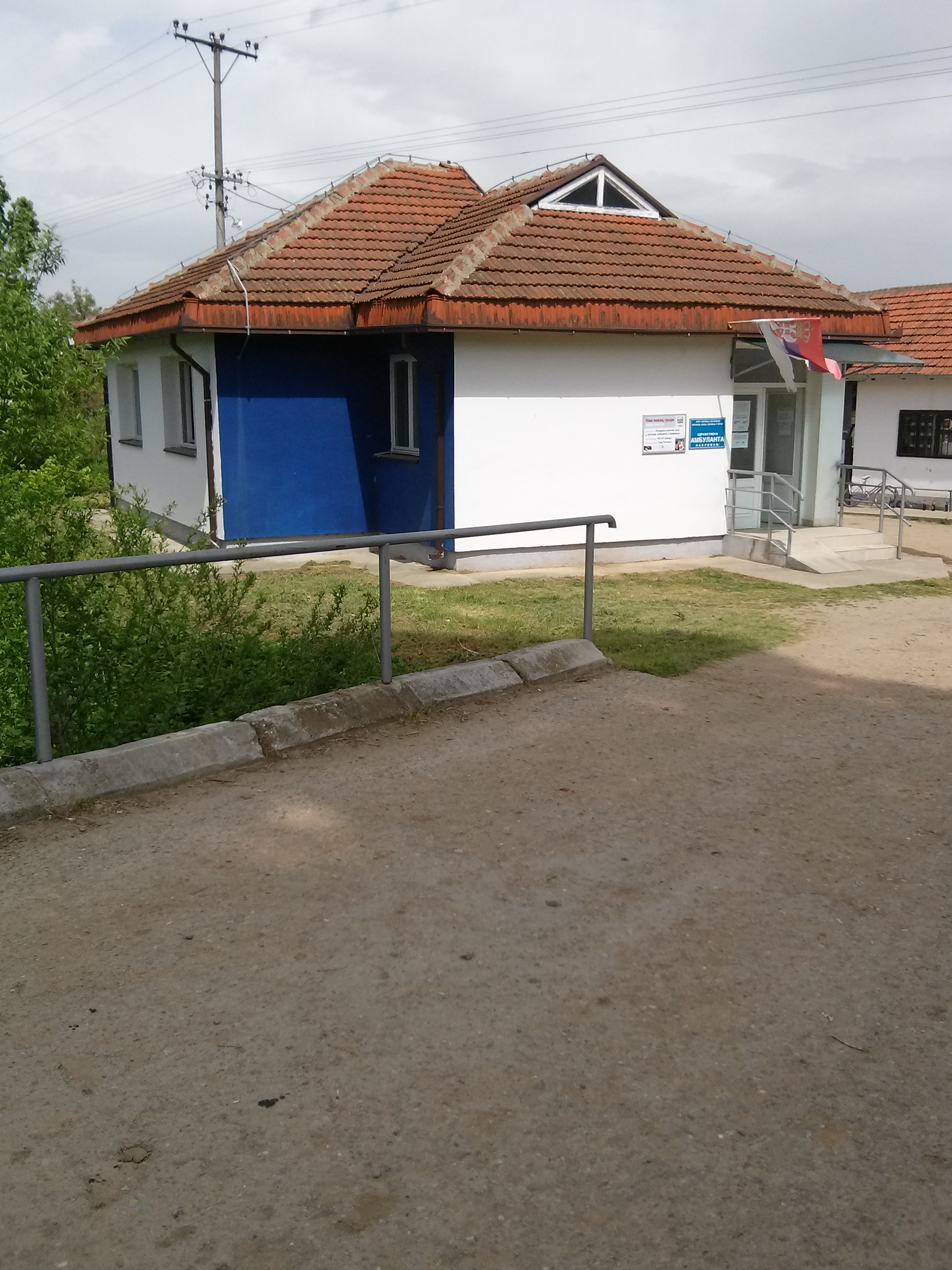
Clinic for out-patients.

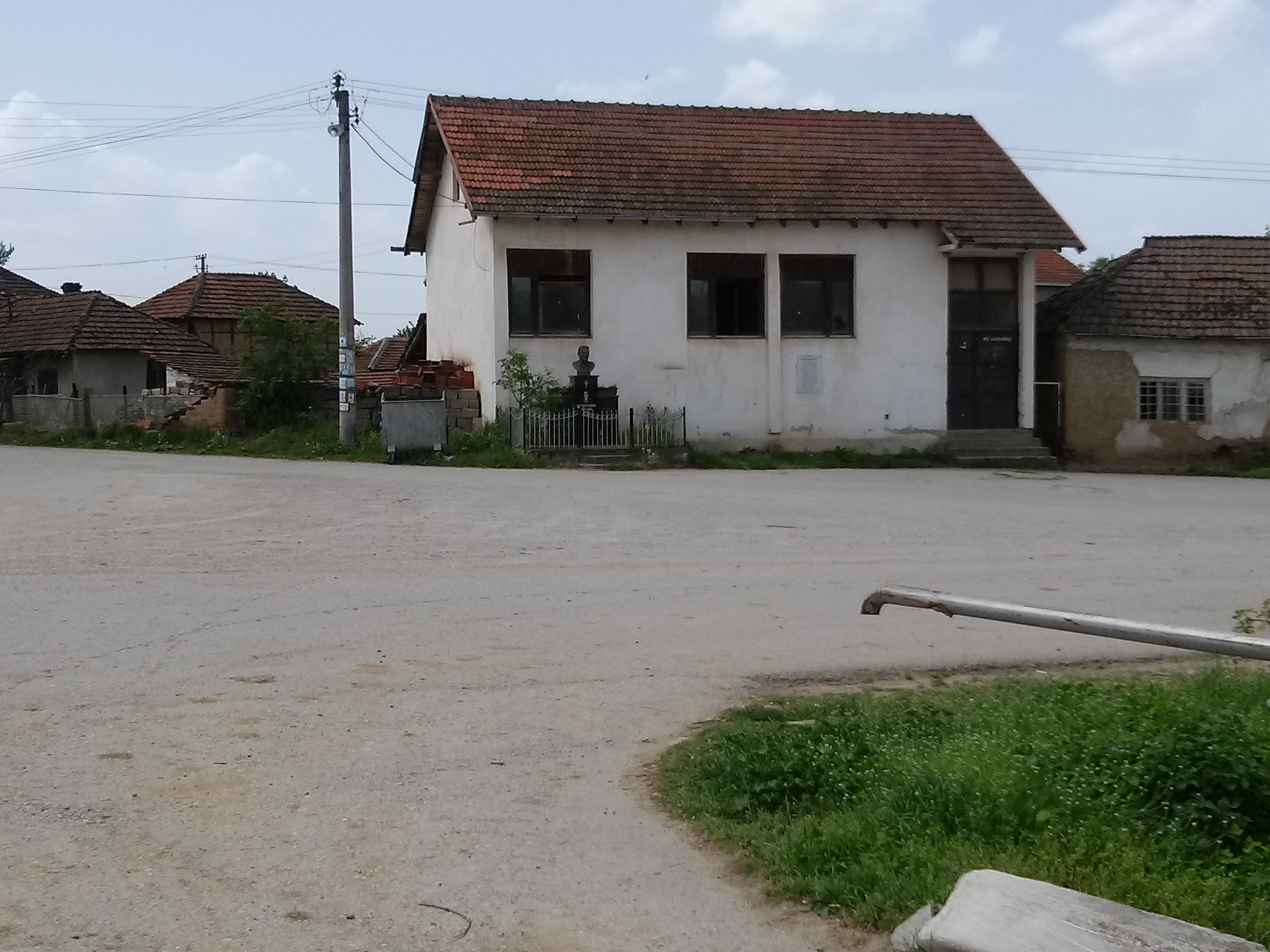
Local office.

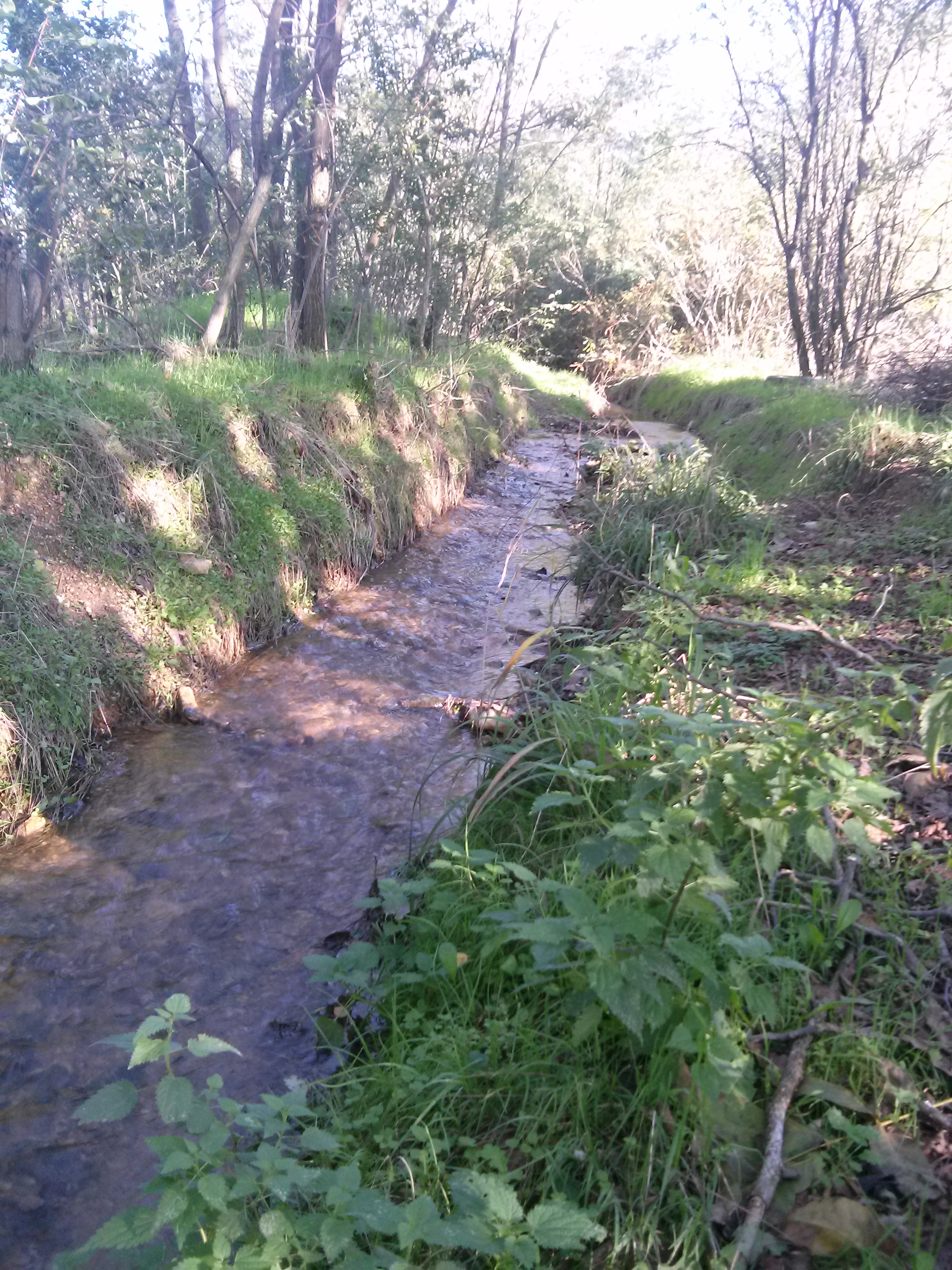
Nakrivanj river.

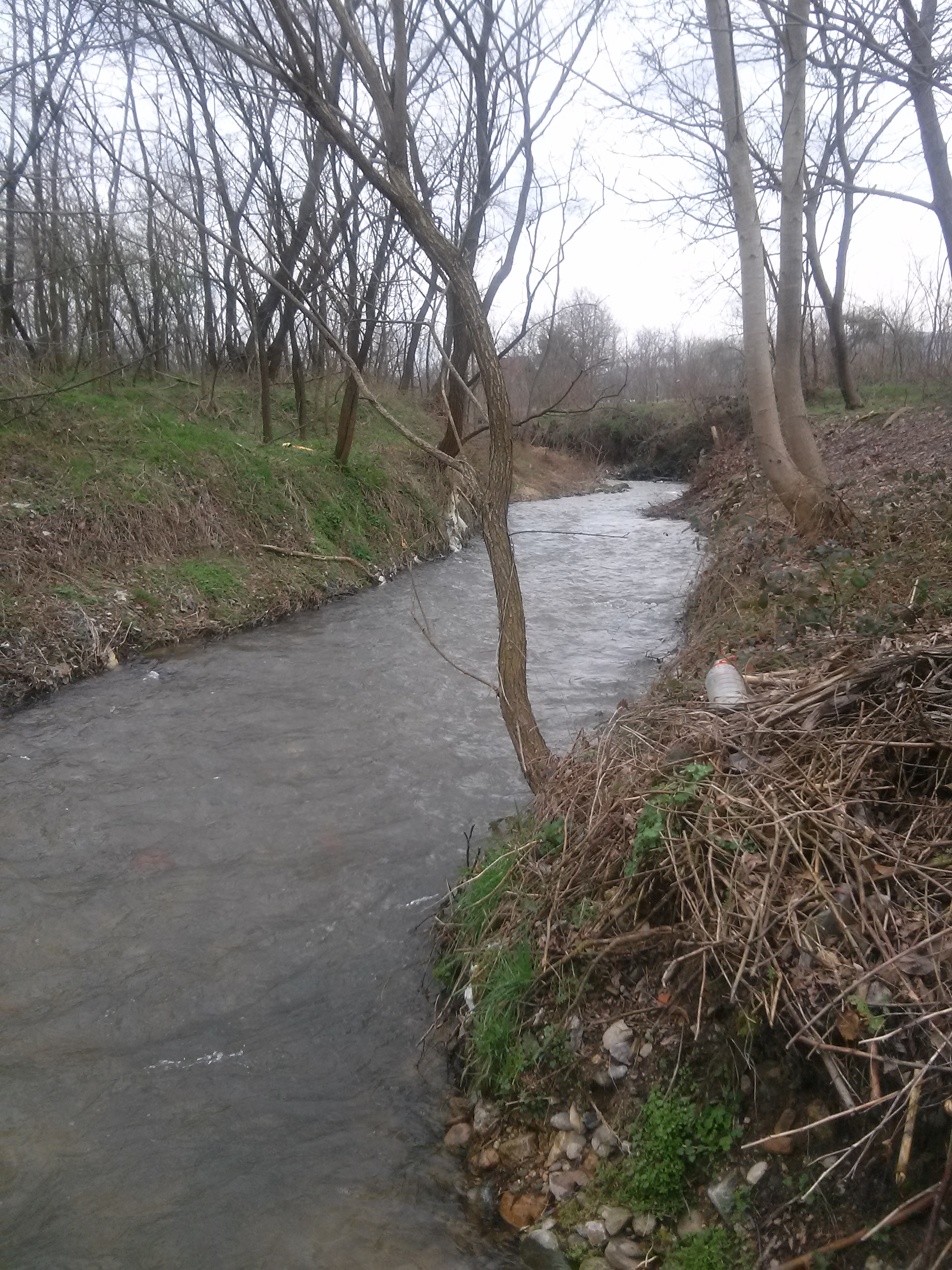
Nakrivanj river.

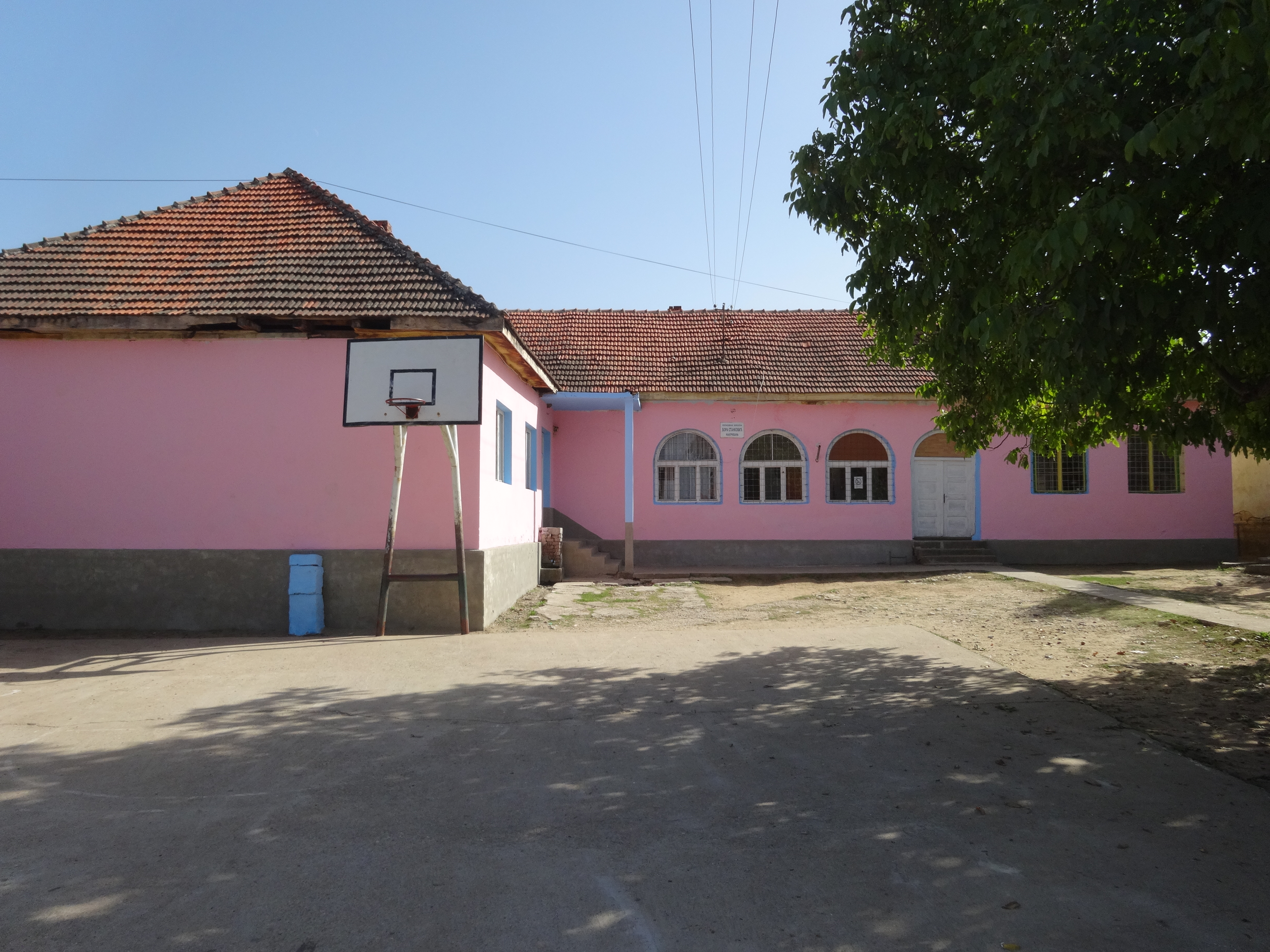
Primary school.

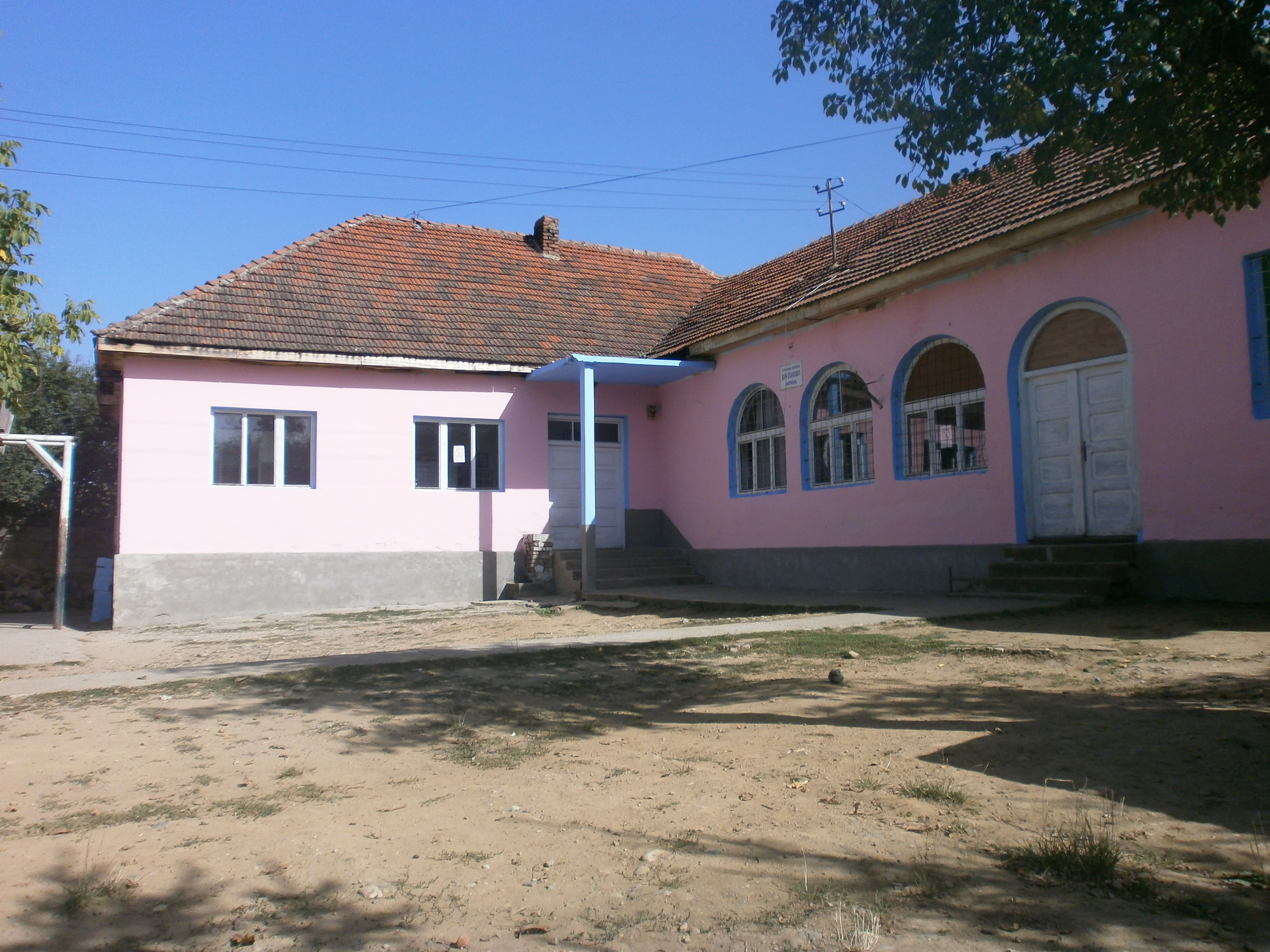
Primary school.

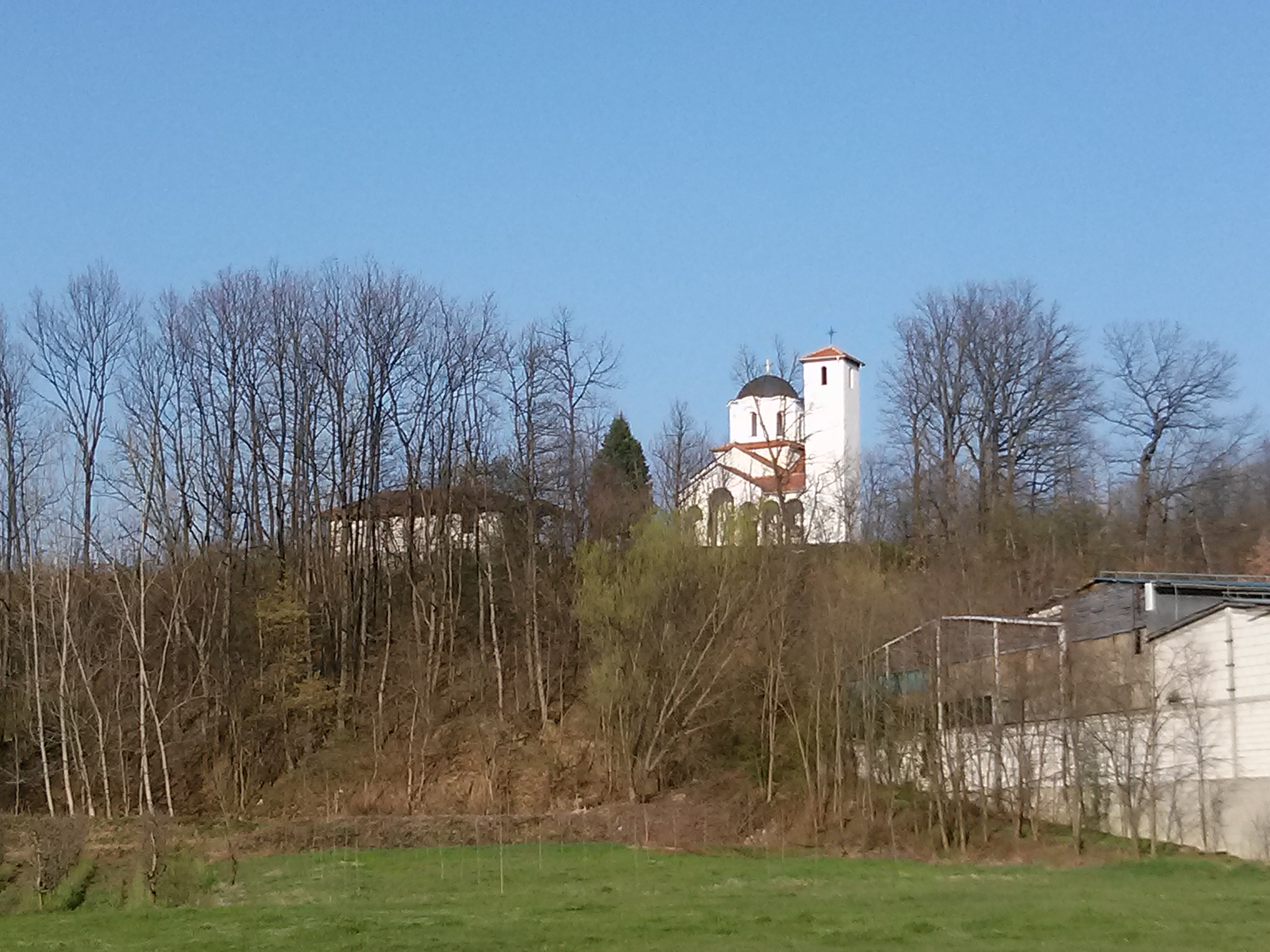
Orthodox church in the Nakrivanjski cifluk.

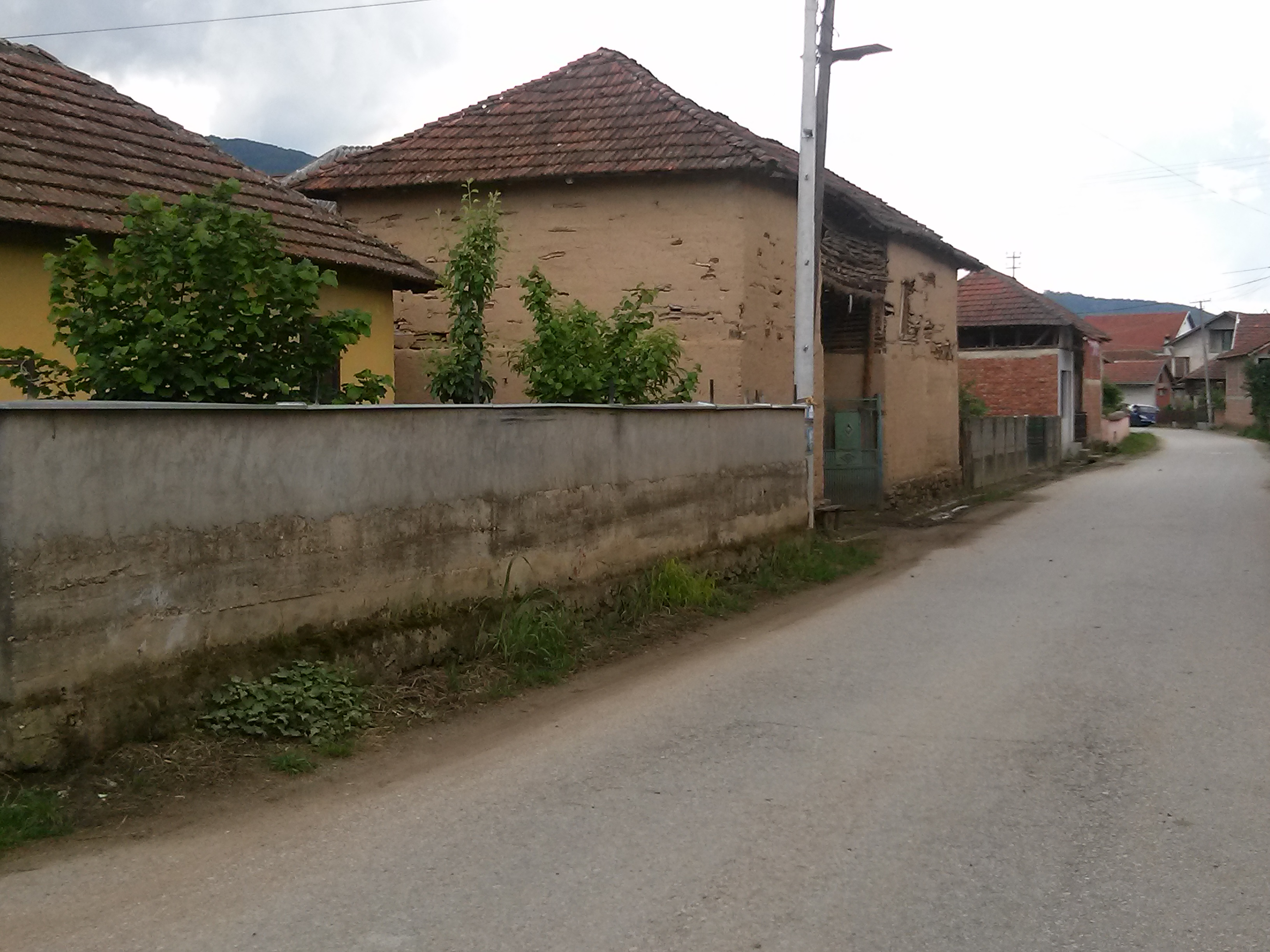
Kulumbarci quarter.

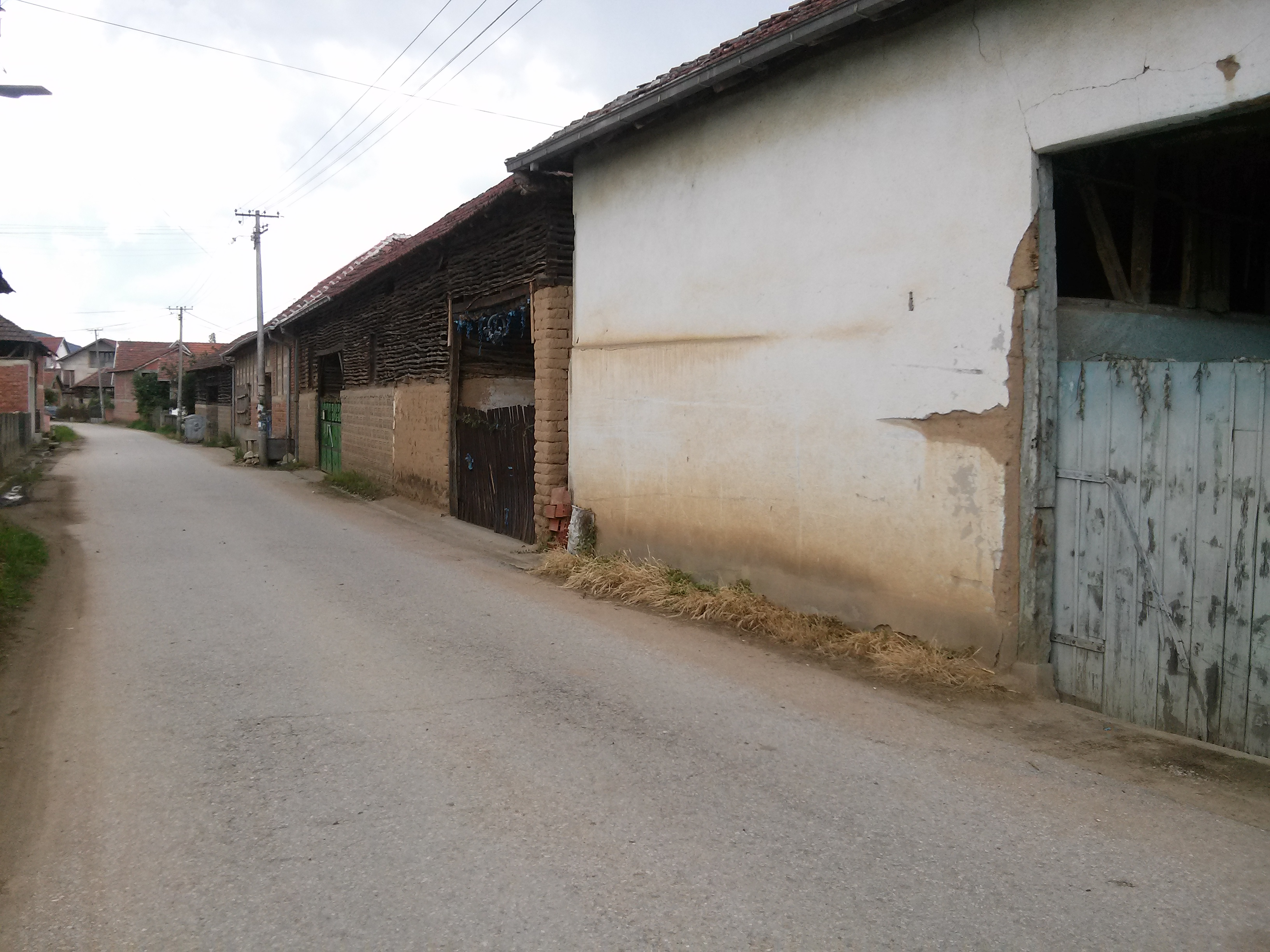
Milenkovici quarter.

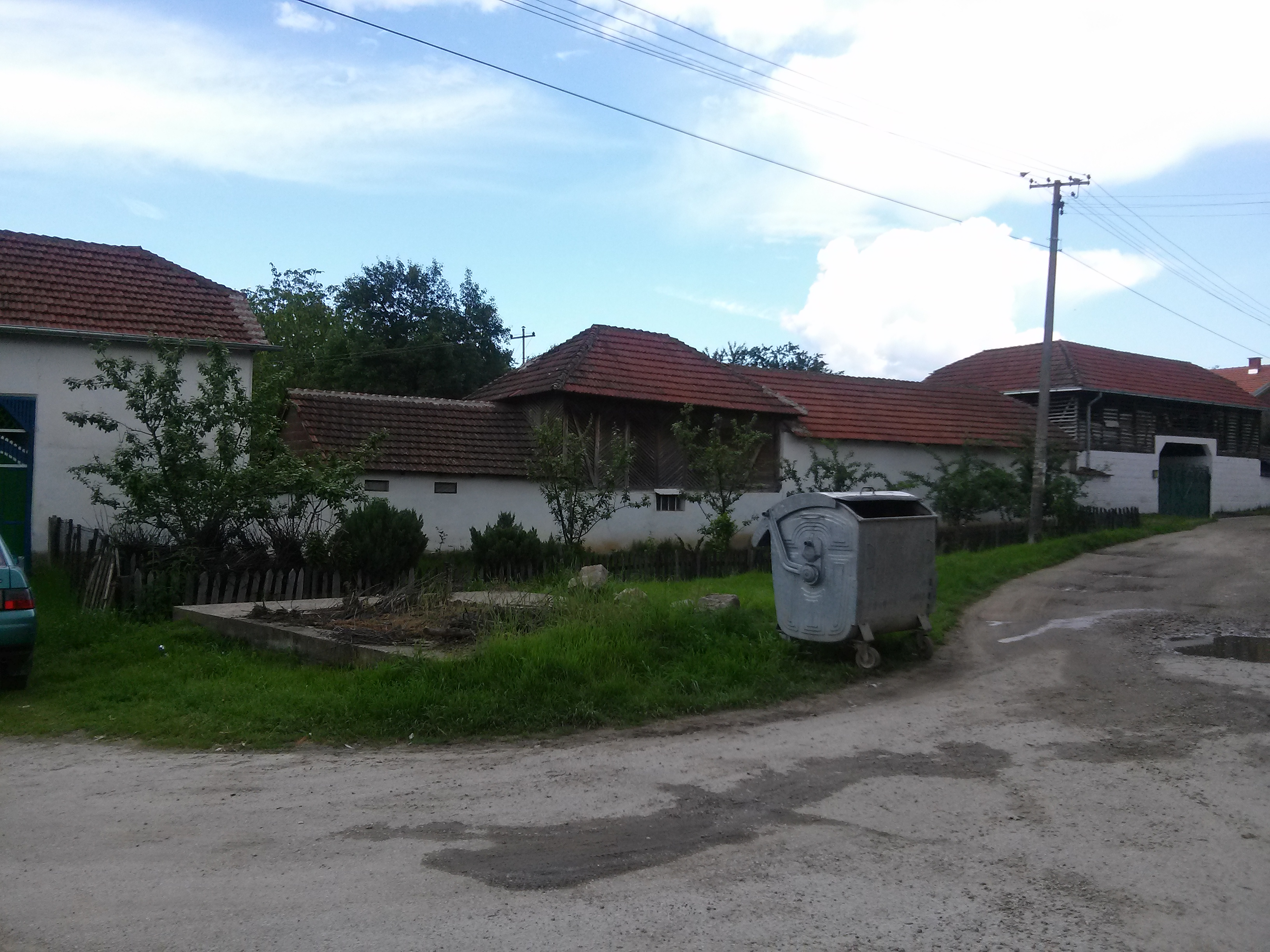
Sopovi quarter.
