= Kumarevo =

Kumarevo may refer to:

- Kumarevo (Leskovac)
- Kumarevo (Vranje)
