= Kumarevo (Leskovac) =

Kumarevo Кумарево
- Village
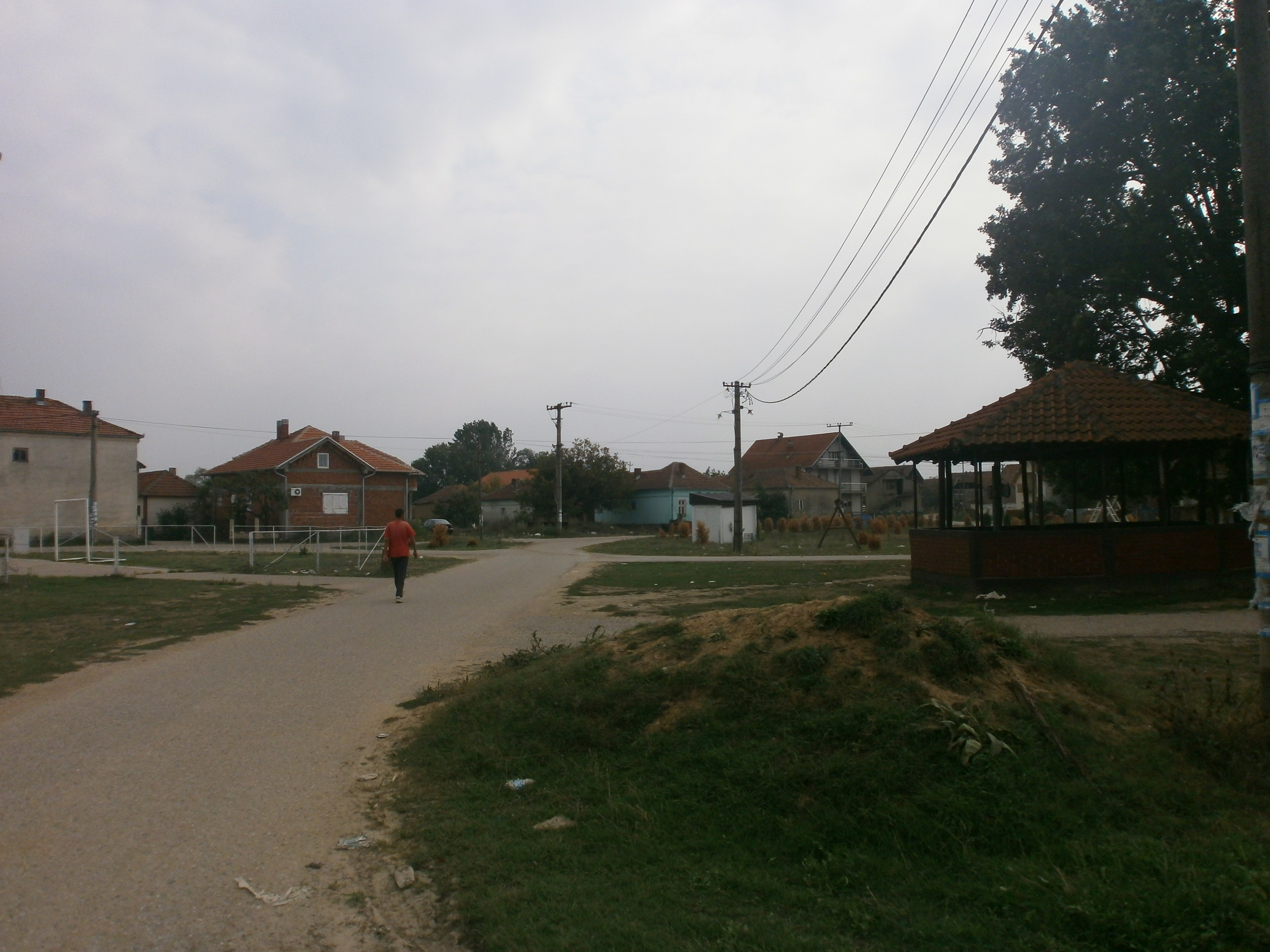

- Location within Serbia
- Coordinates: 43°01′31″N 21°59′50″E
- Country: Serbia
- District: Jablanica District
- Municipality: Leskovac

Population (2002)
  - Total: 825
- Time zone: UTC+1 (CET)
  - Summer (DST): UTC+2 (CEST)

Kumarevo is a village in the municipality of Leskovac, Serbia. According to the 2002 census, the village has a population of 825 people.

== Gallery ==
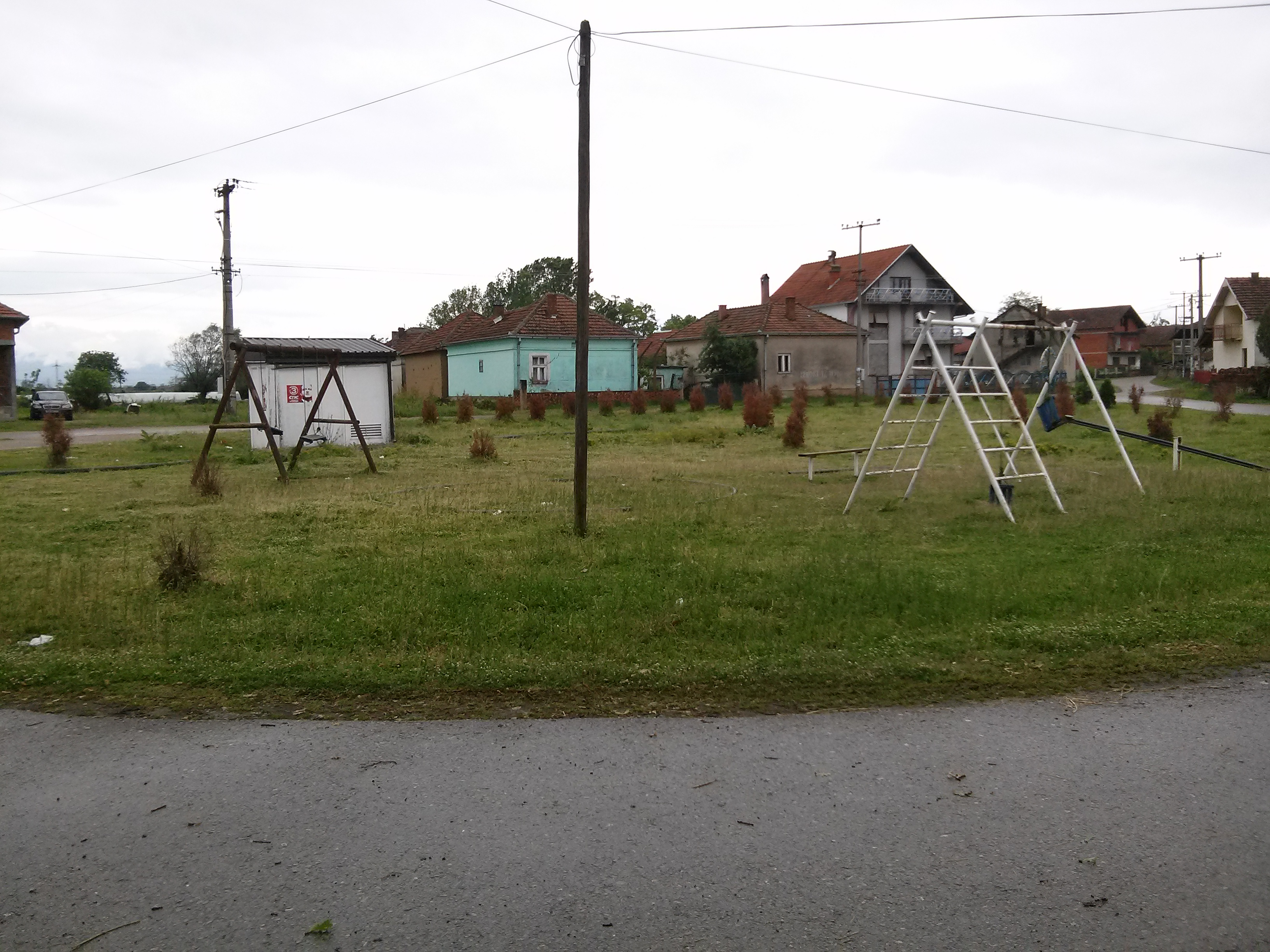
A playground.

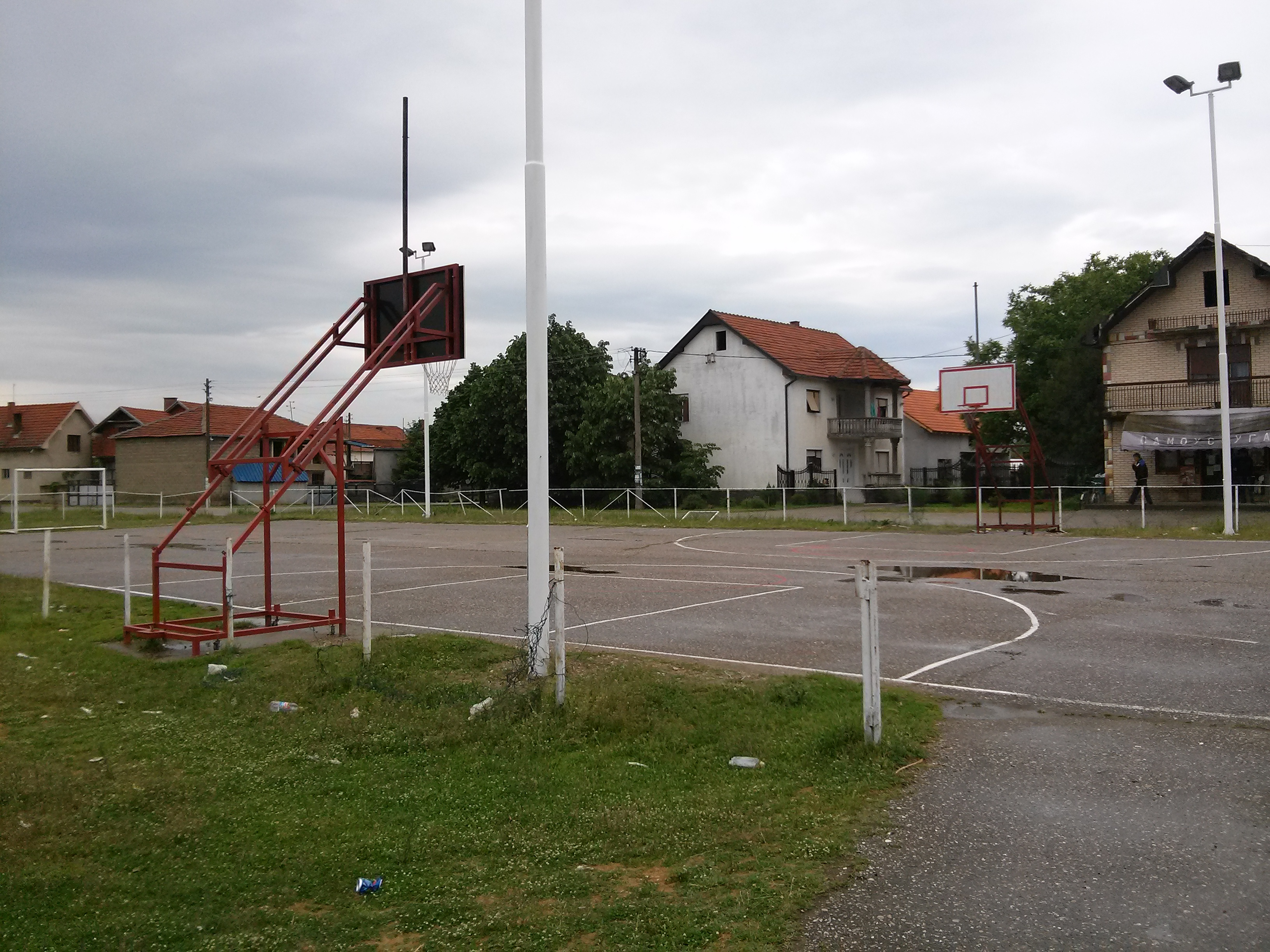
A playground.

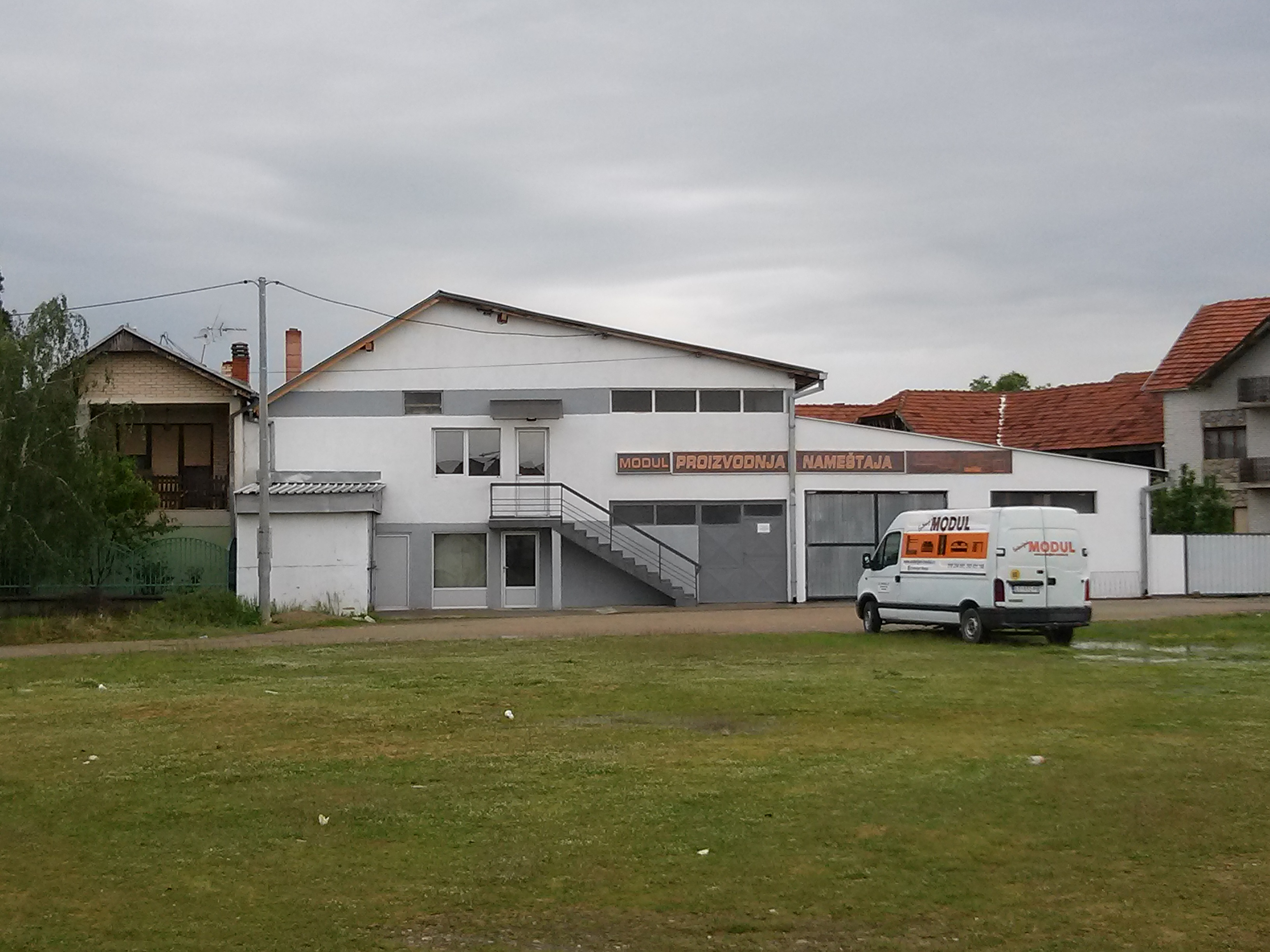
A factory.

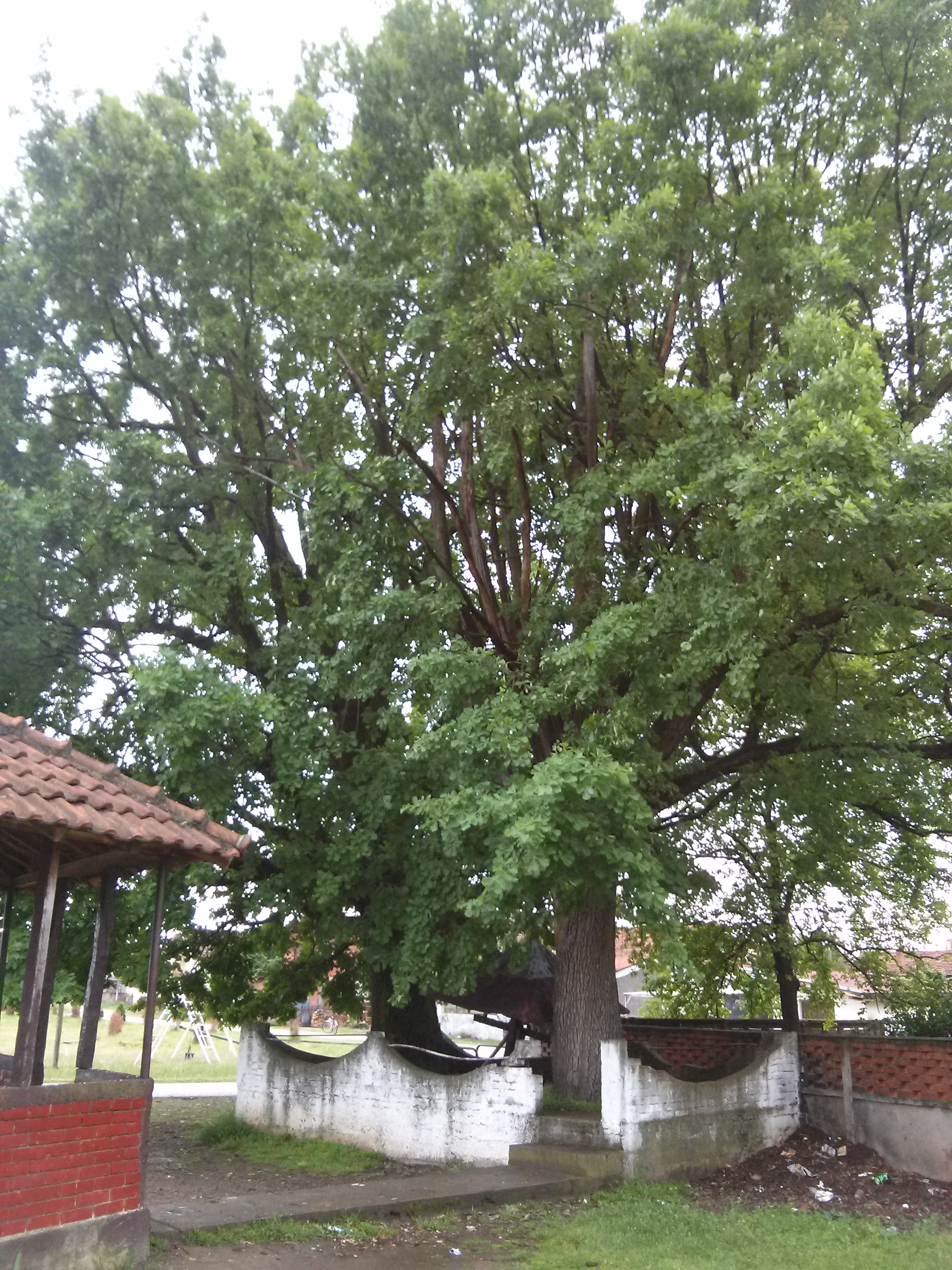
Old oaks.

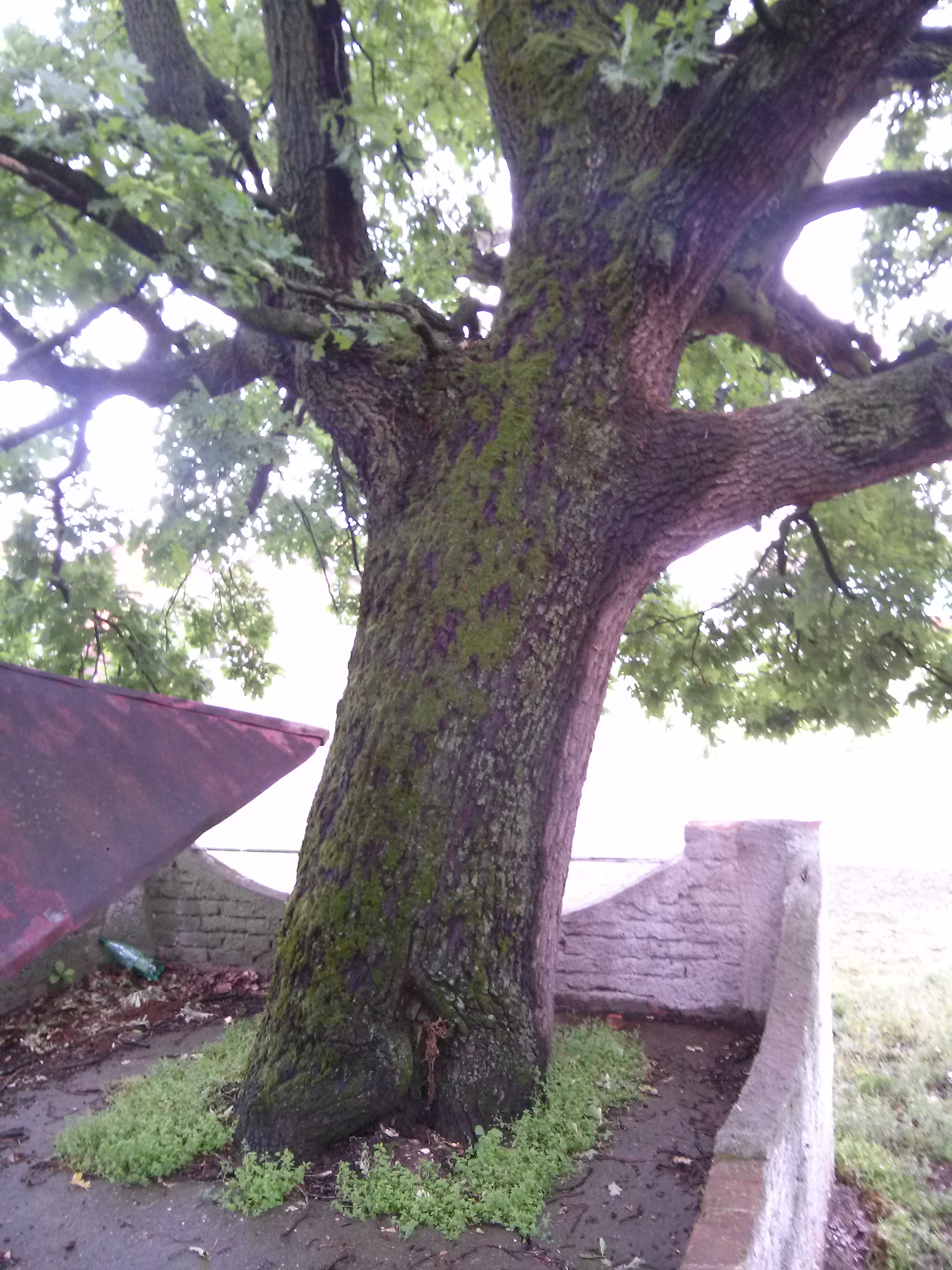
An old oak.

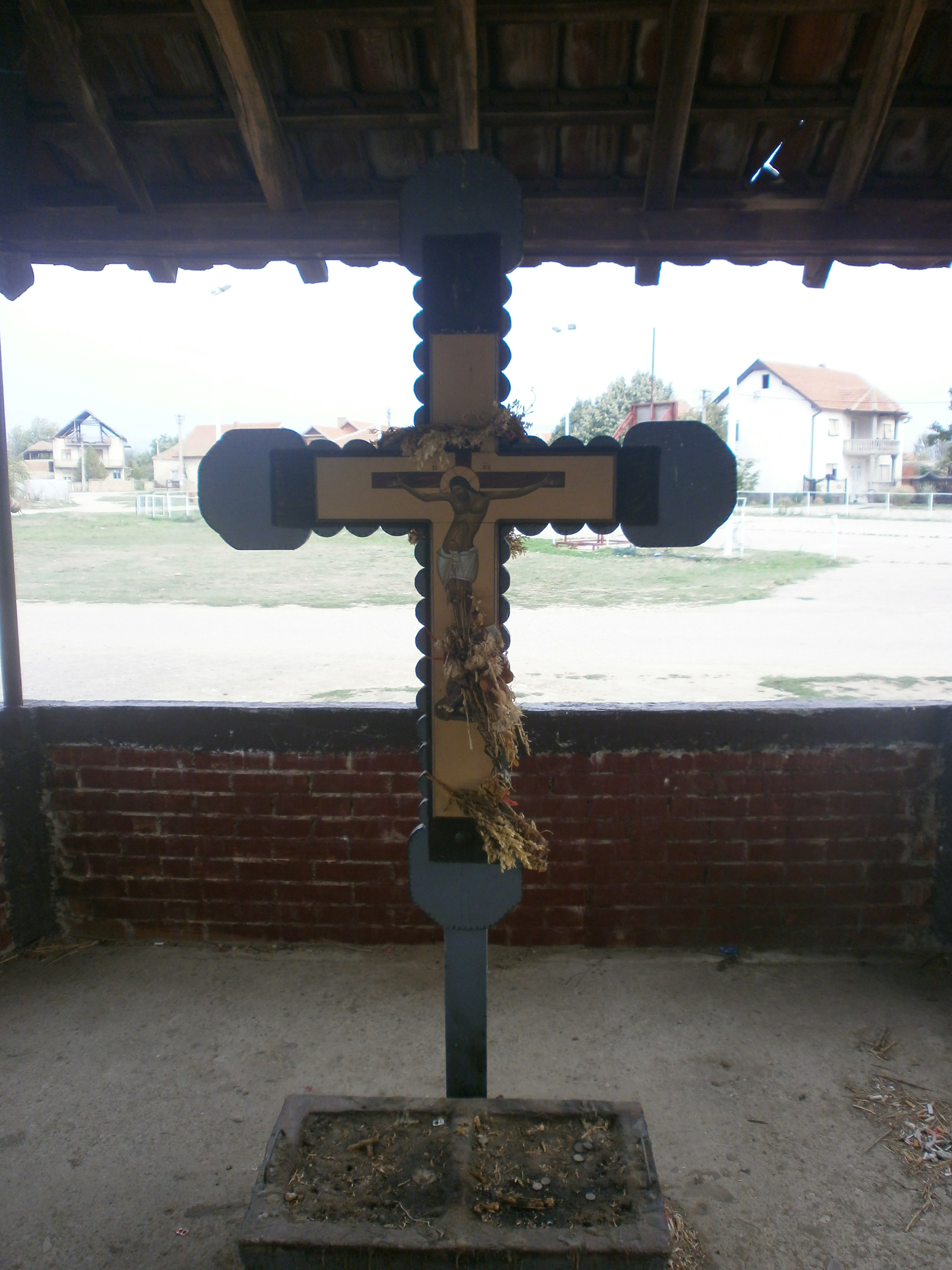
A new Orthodox cross.

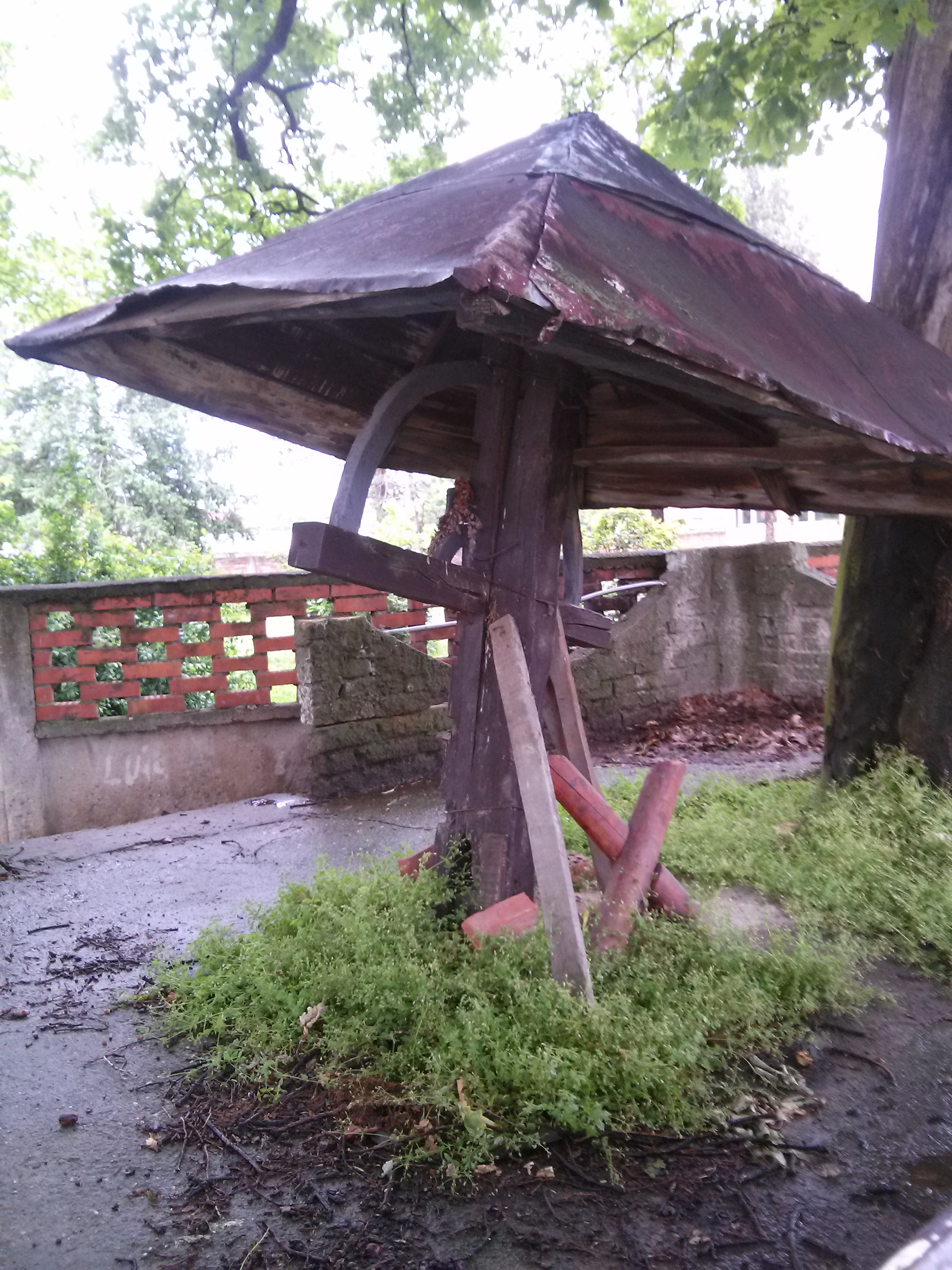
An old Orthodox cross.

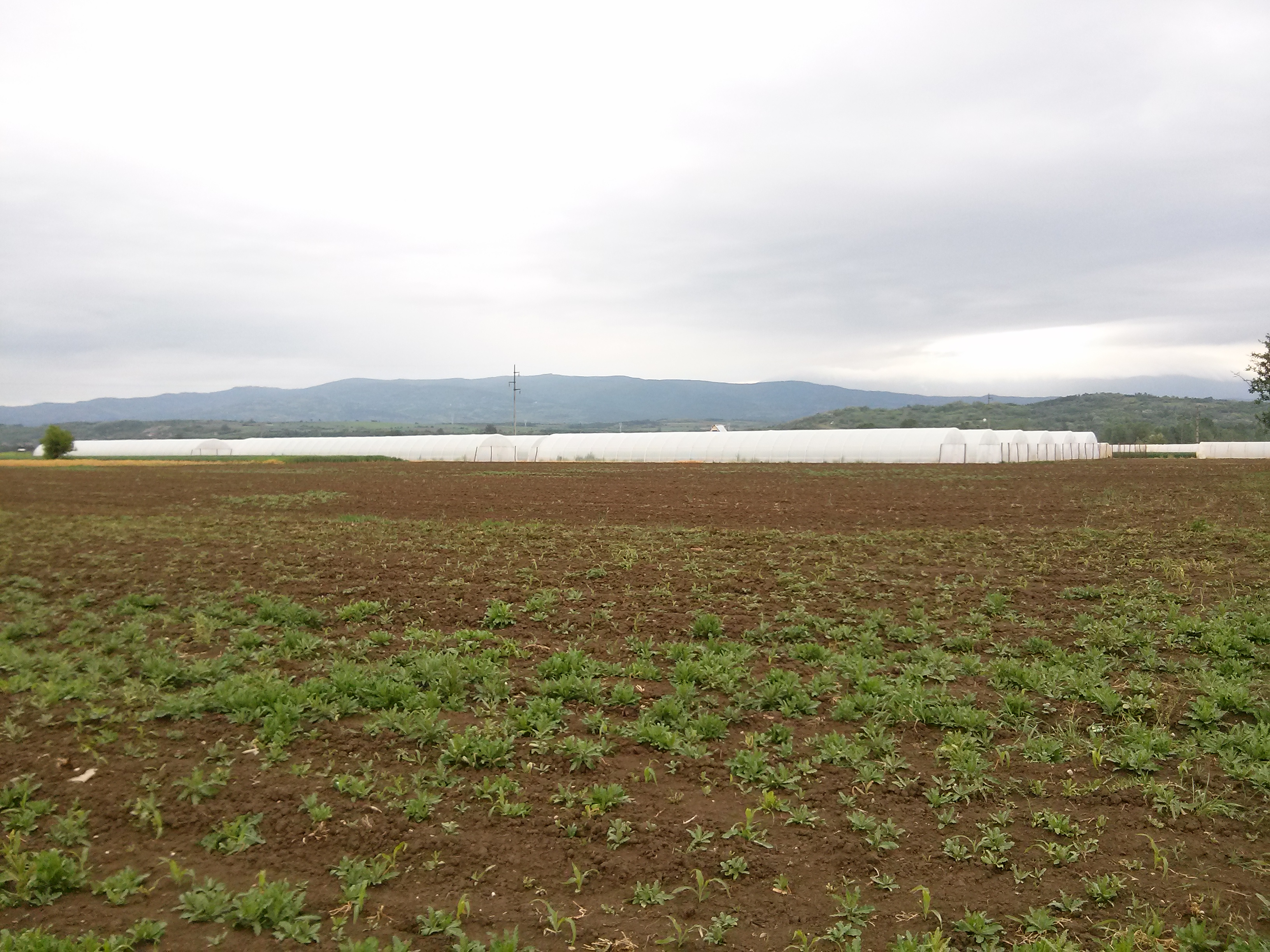
Fields around the village.

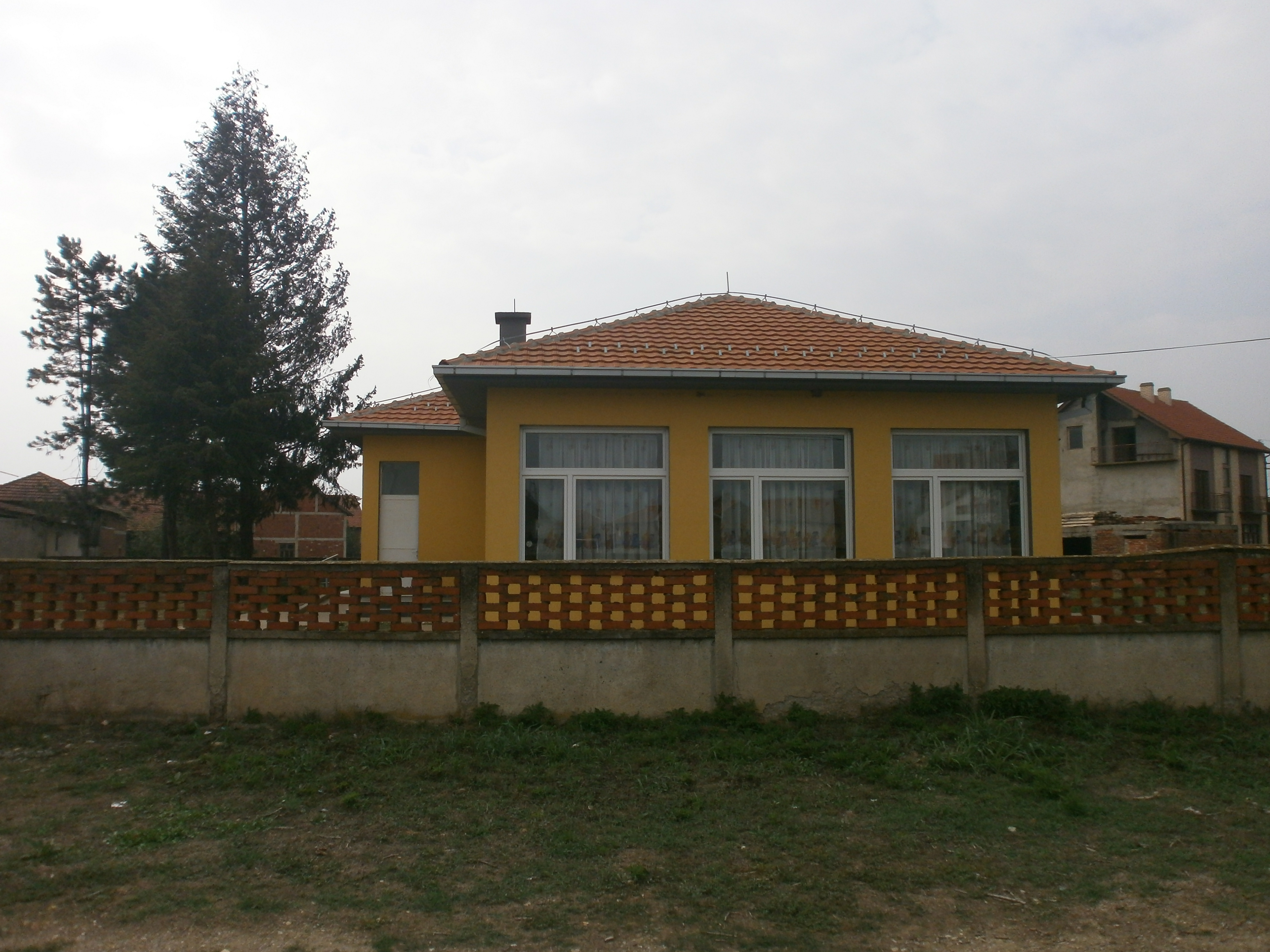
Primary school.

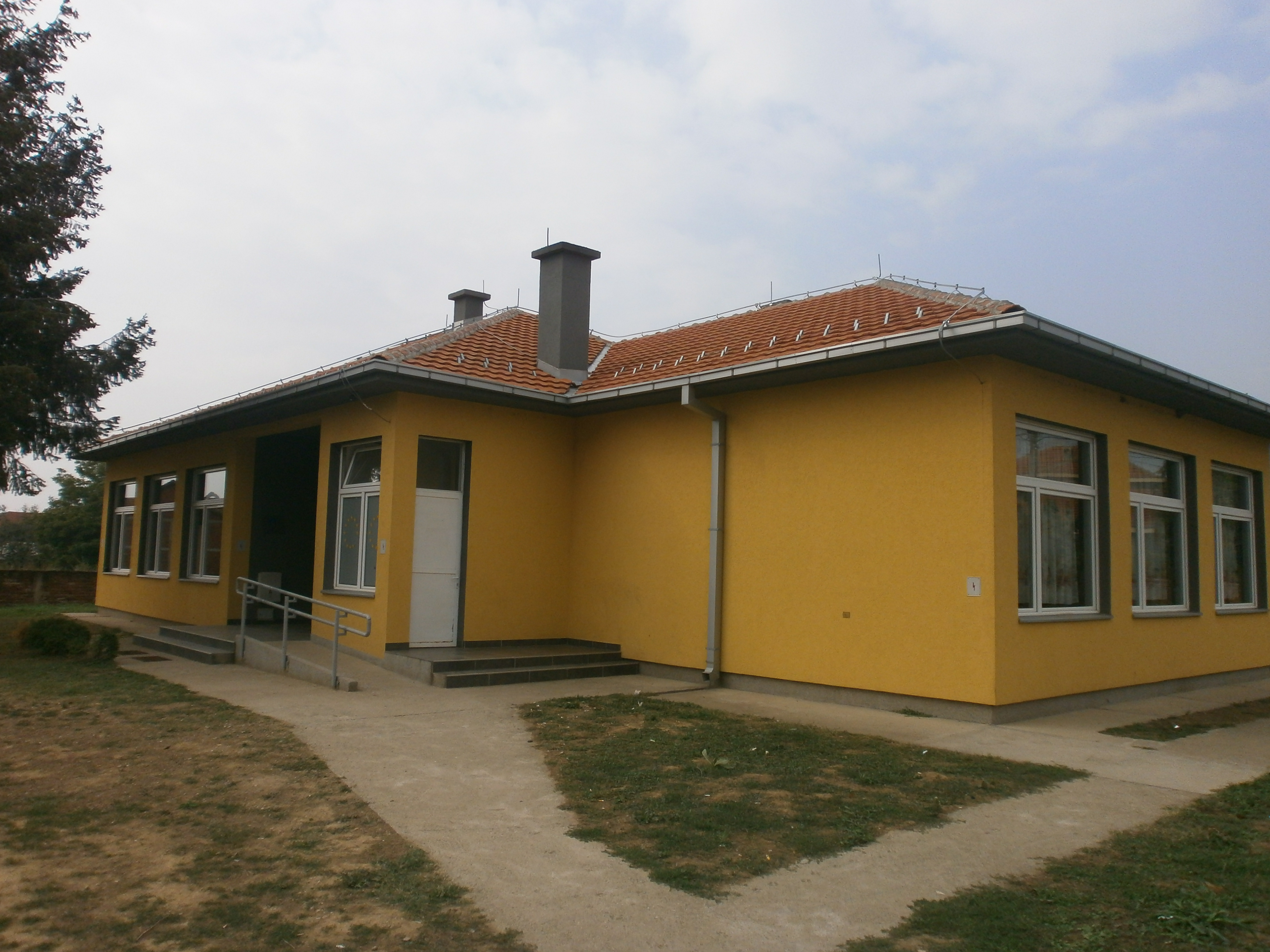
Primary school.

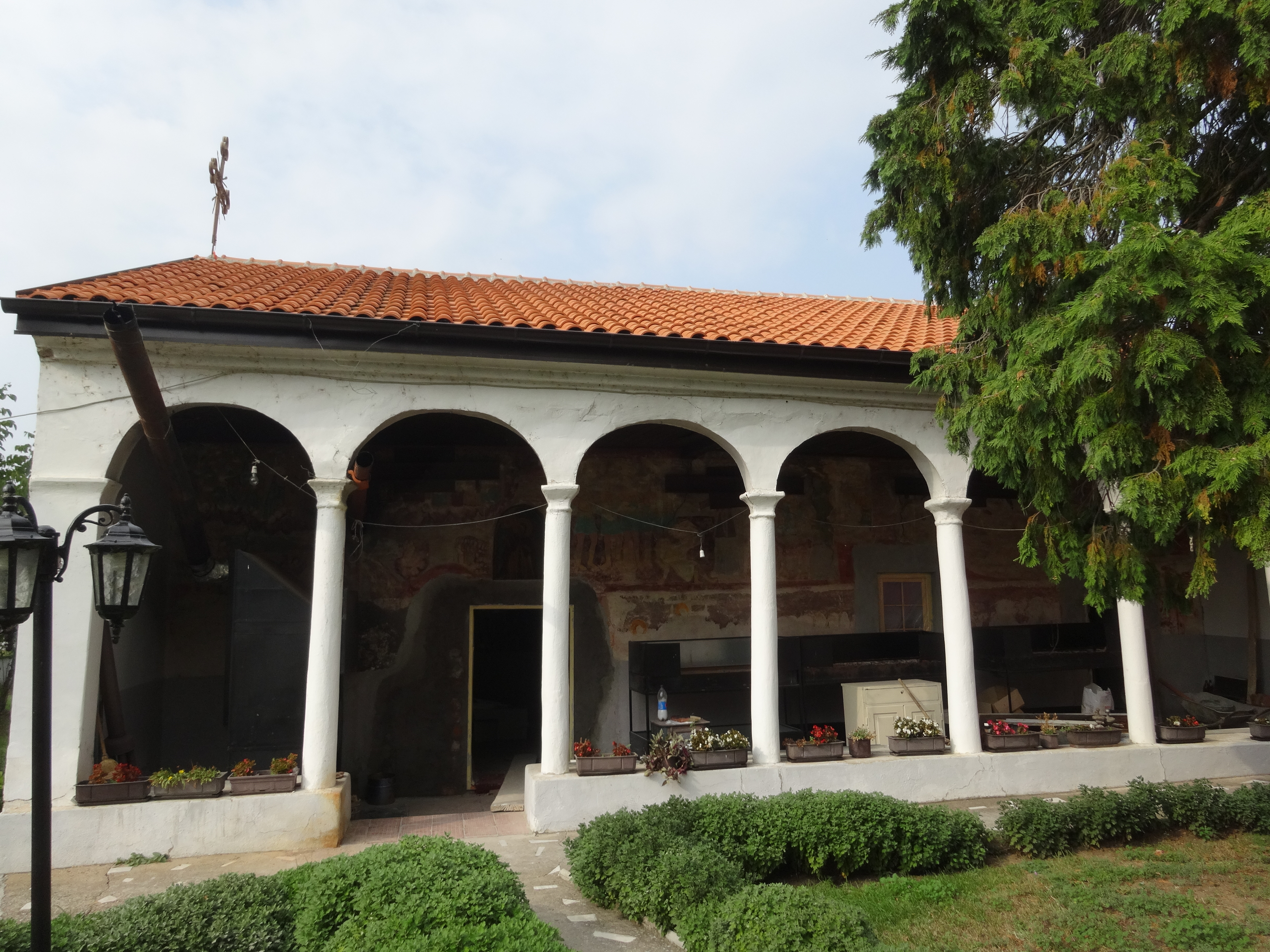
The old church.

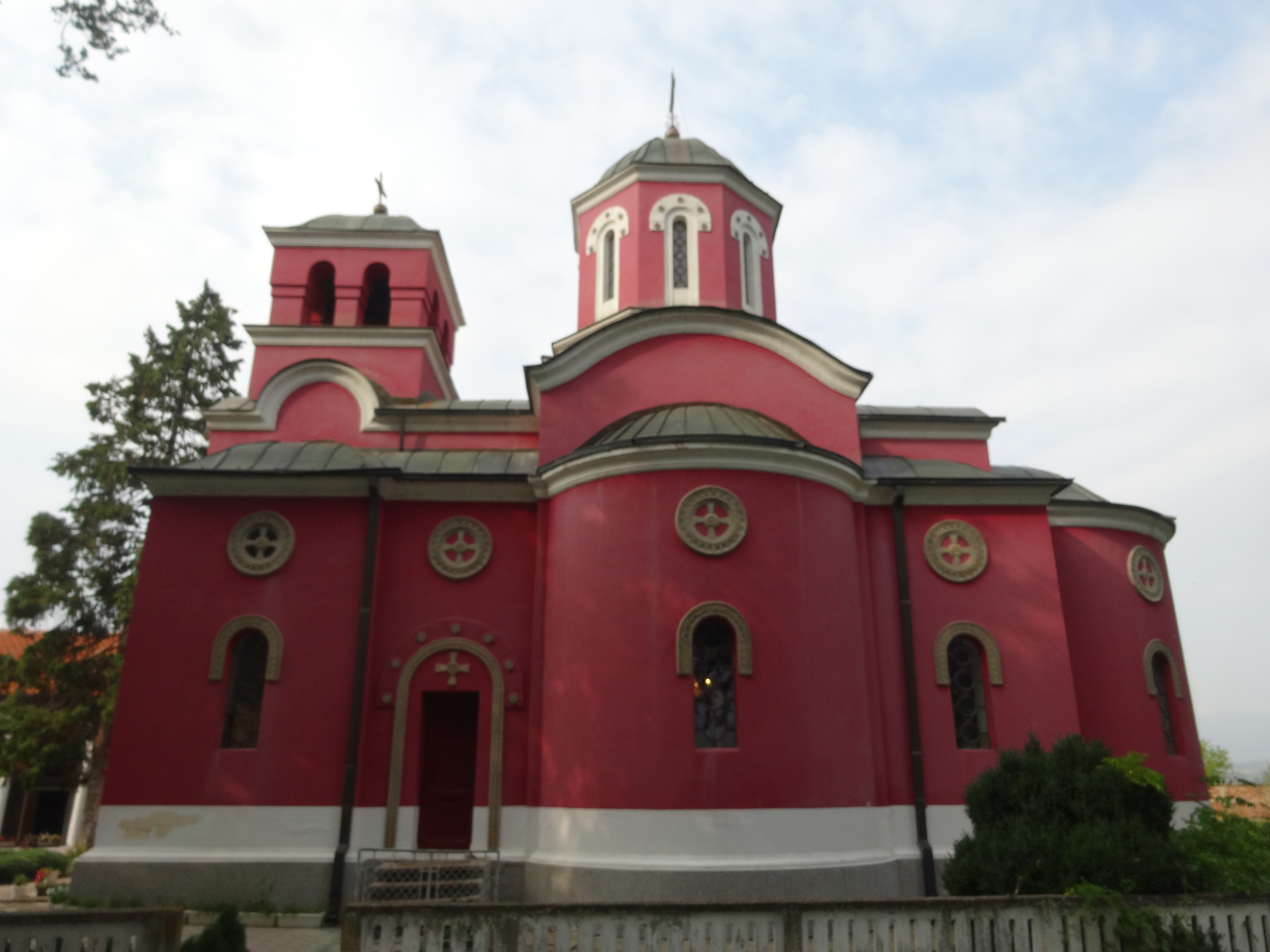
The new church.
