= Belanovce (Leskovac) =

Belanovce Белановце
- Village
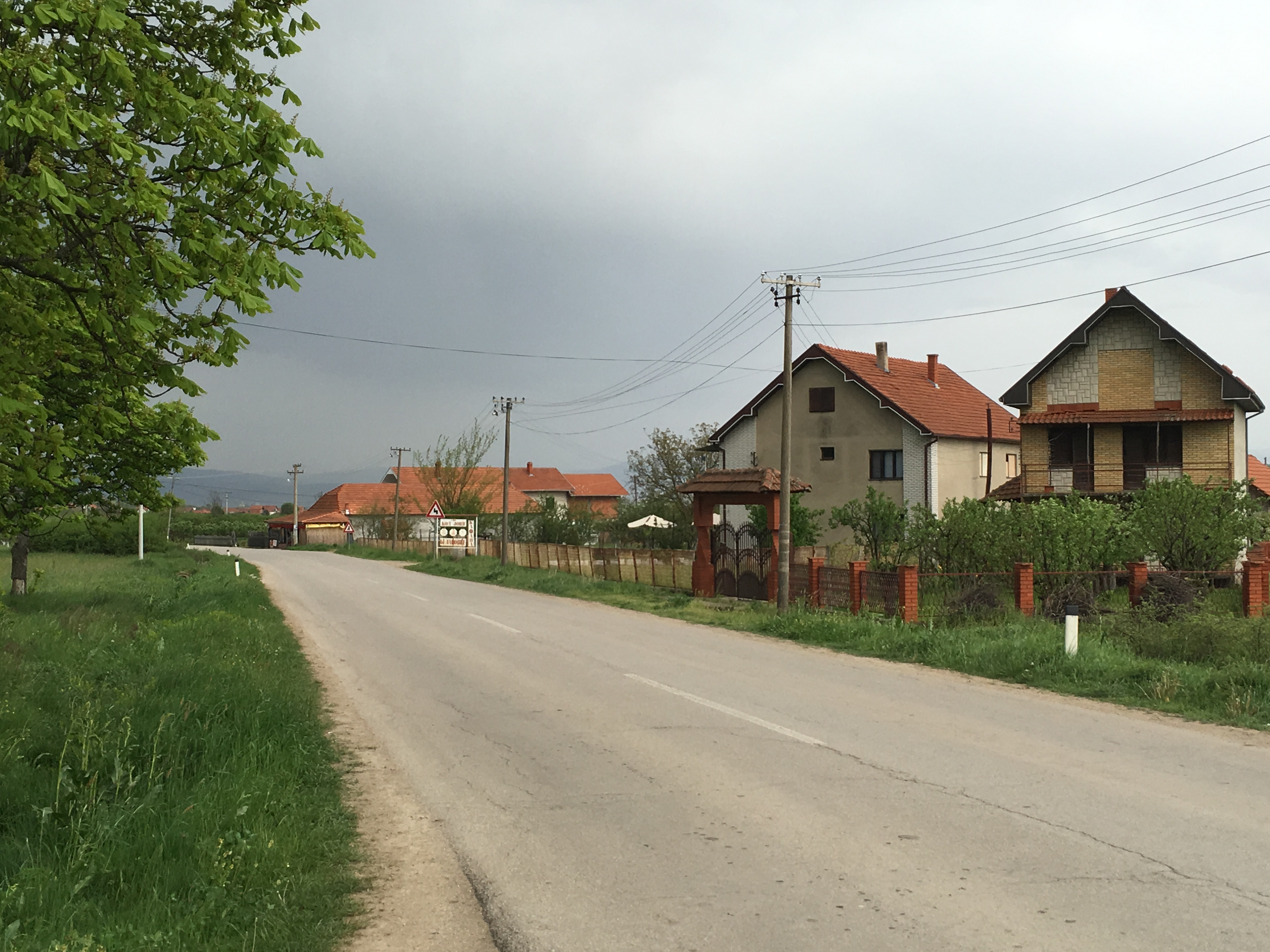

- Location within Serbia
- Coordinates: 43°01′16″N 21°50′40″E
- Country: Serbia
- District: Jablanica District
- Municipality: Leskovac
- Elevation: 869 ft (265 m)
- Time zone: UTC+1 (CET)
  - Summer (DST): UTC+2 (CEST)

Belanovce is a village in the municipality of Leskovac, Serbia. According to the 2002 census, the village has a population of 600 people.

== Gallery ==
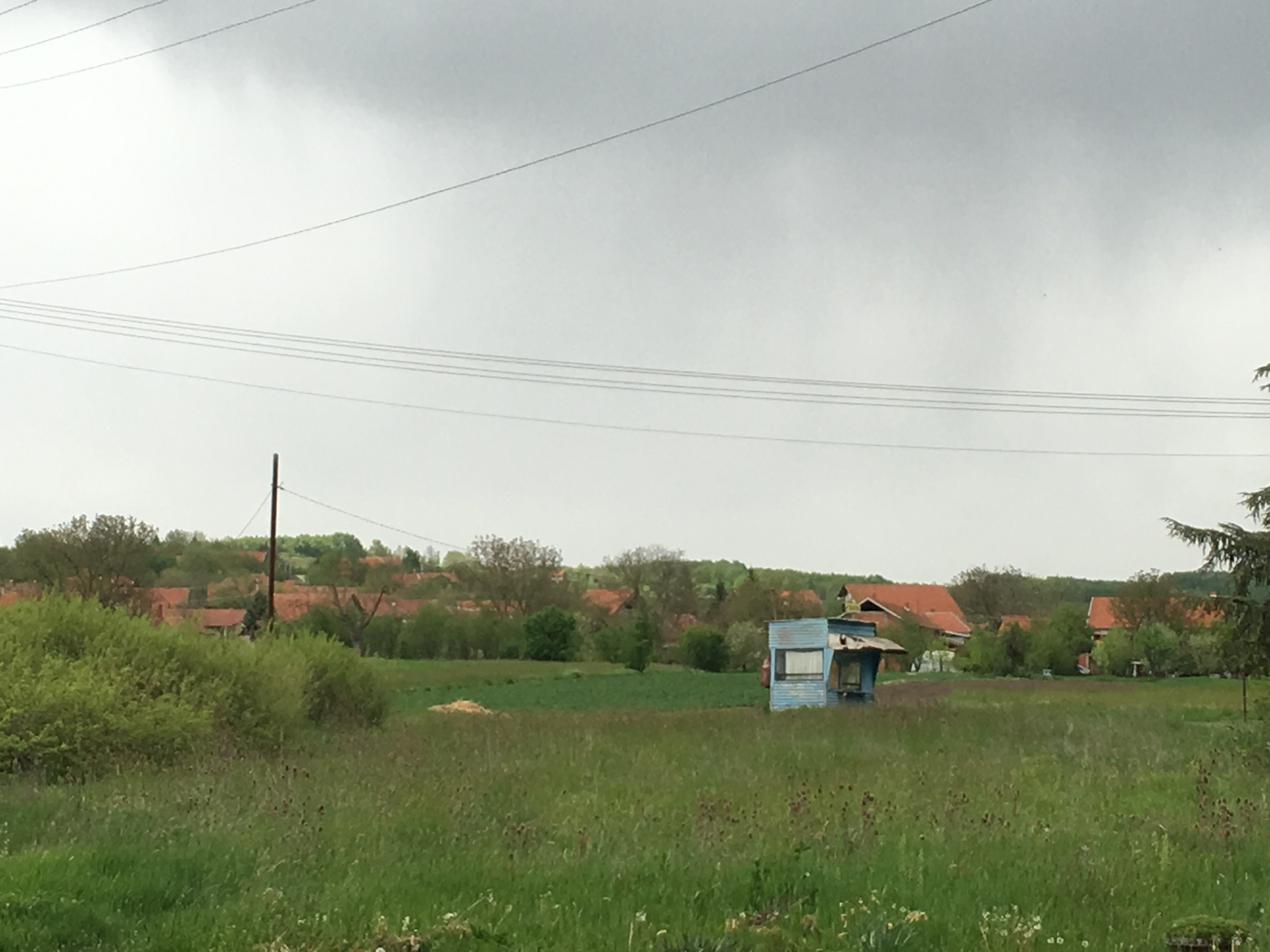

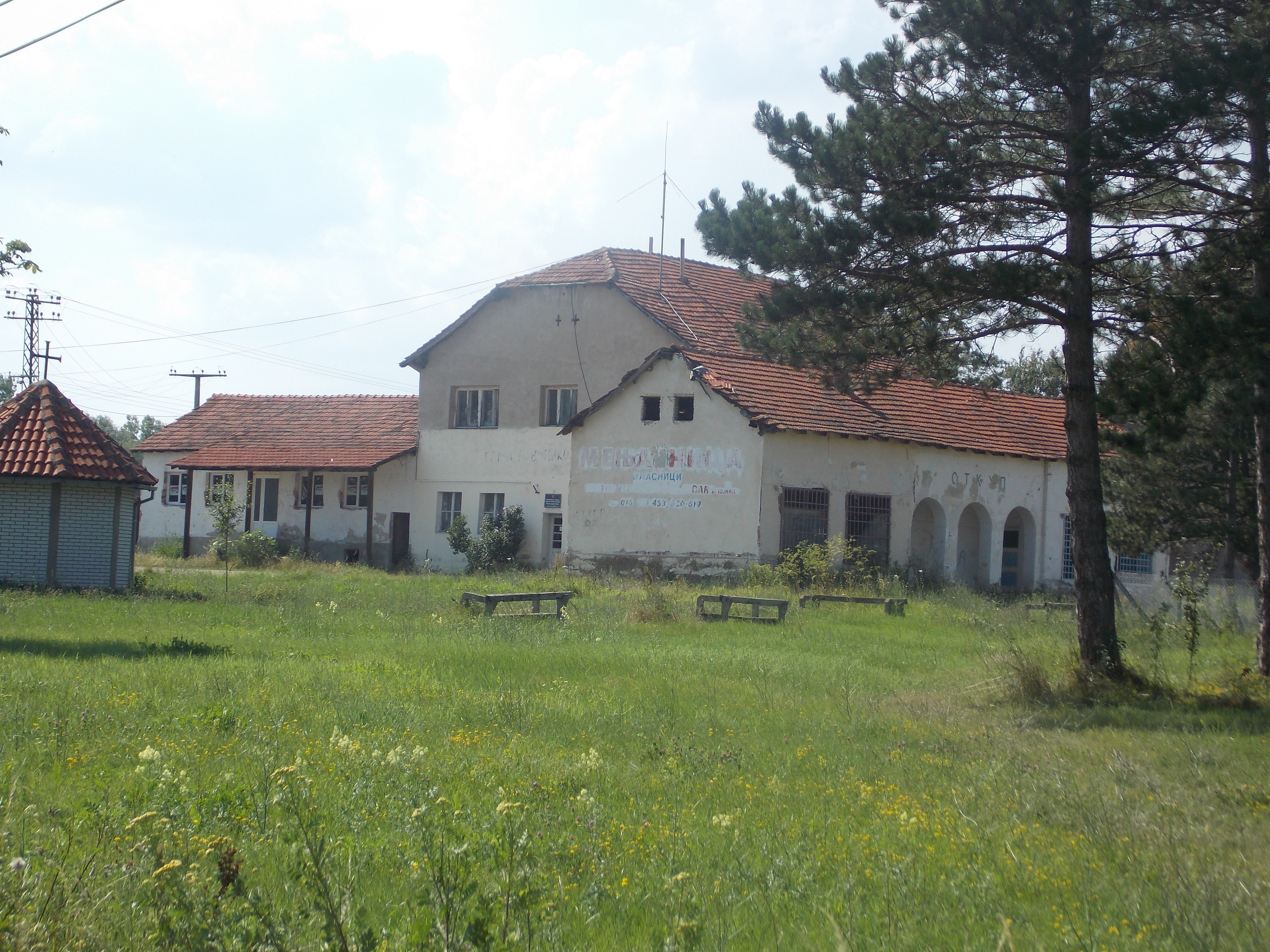

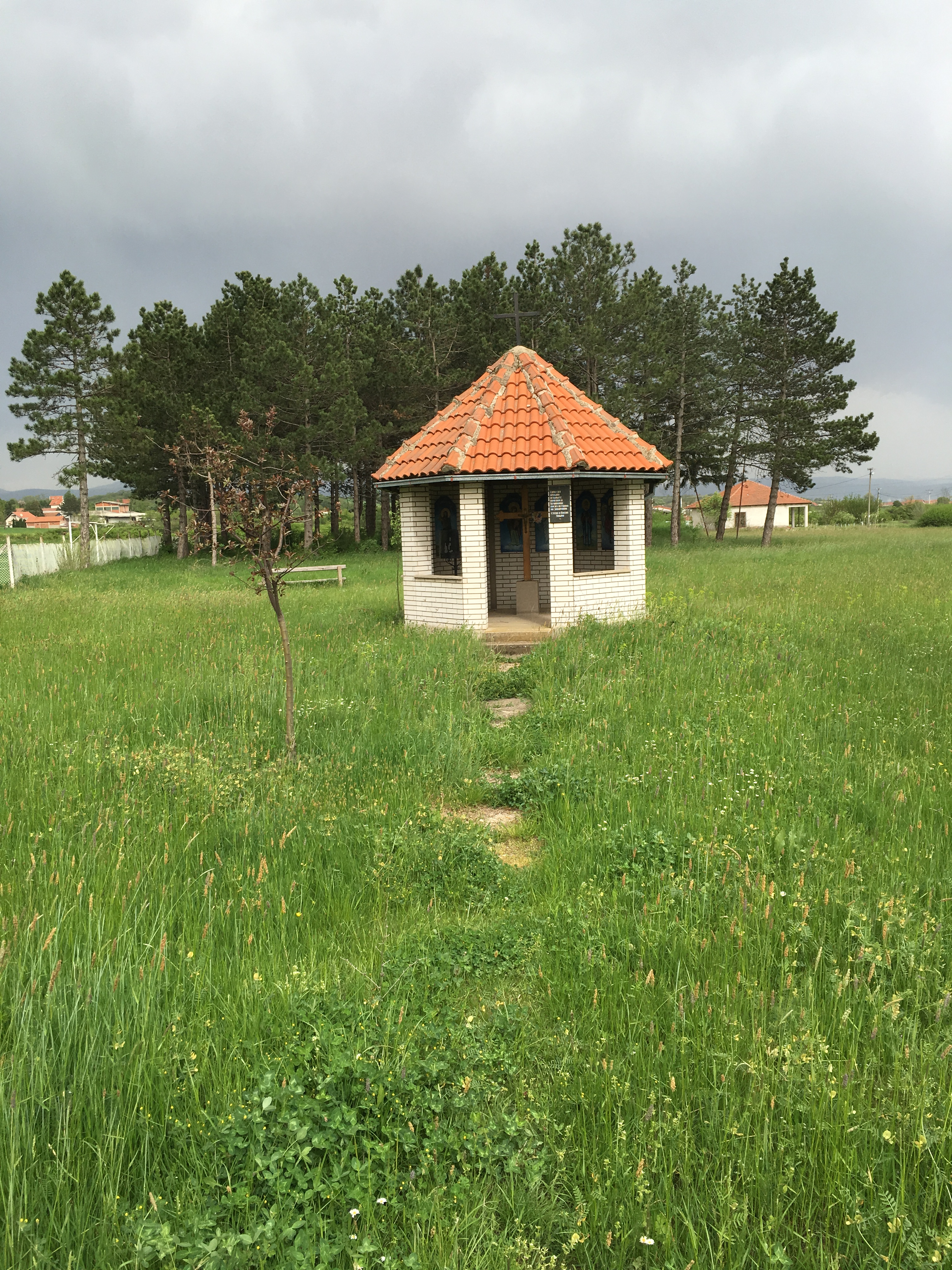
Orthodox cross.

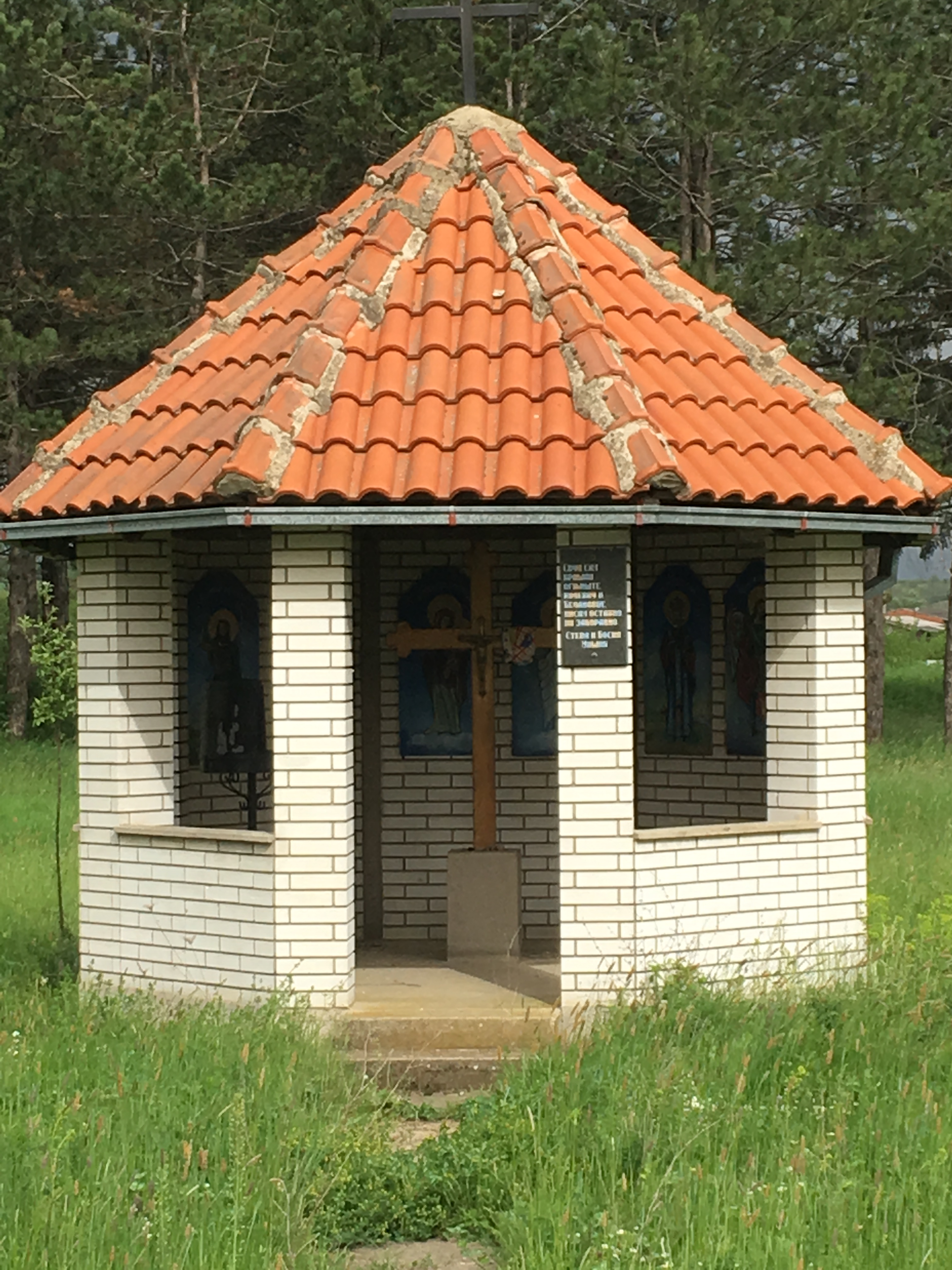
Orthodox cross.

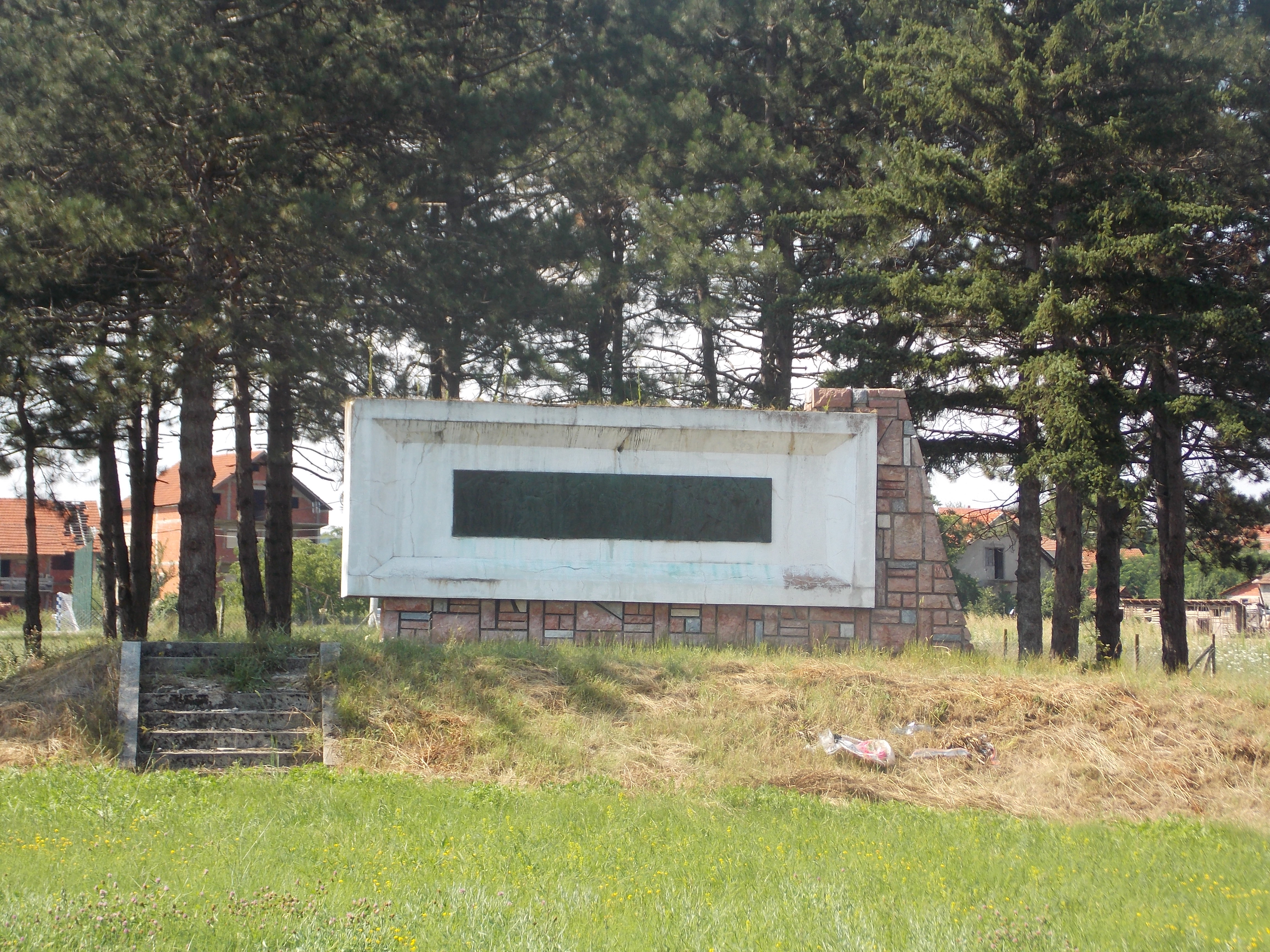
A memorial.

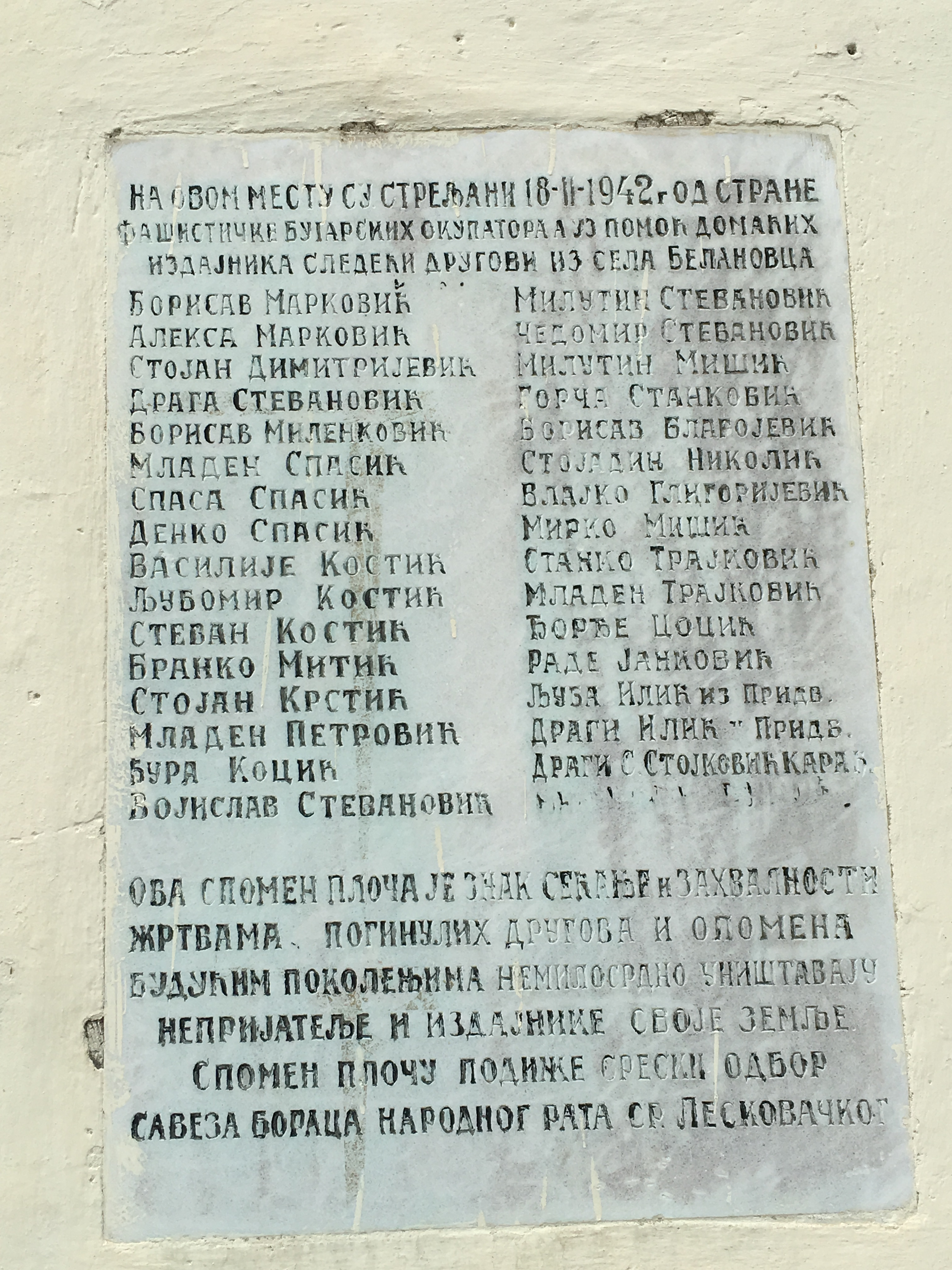
A memorial.

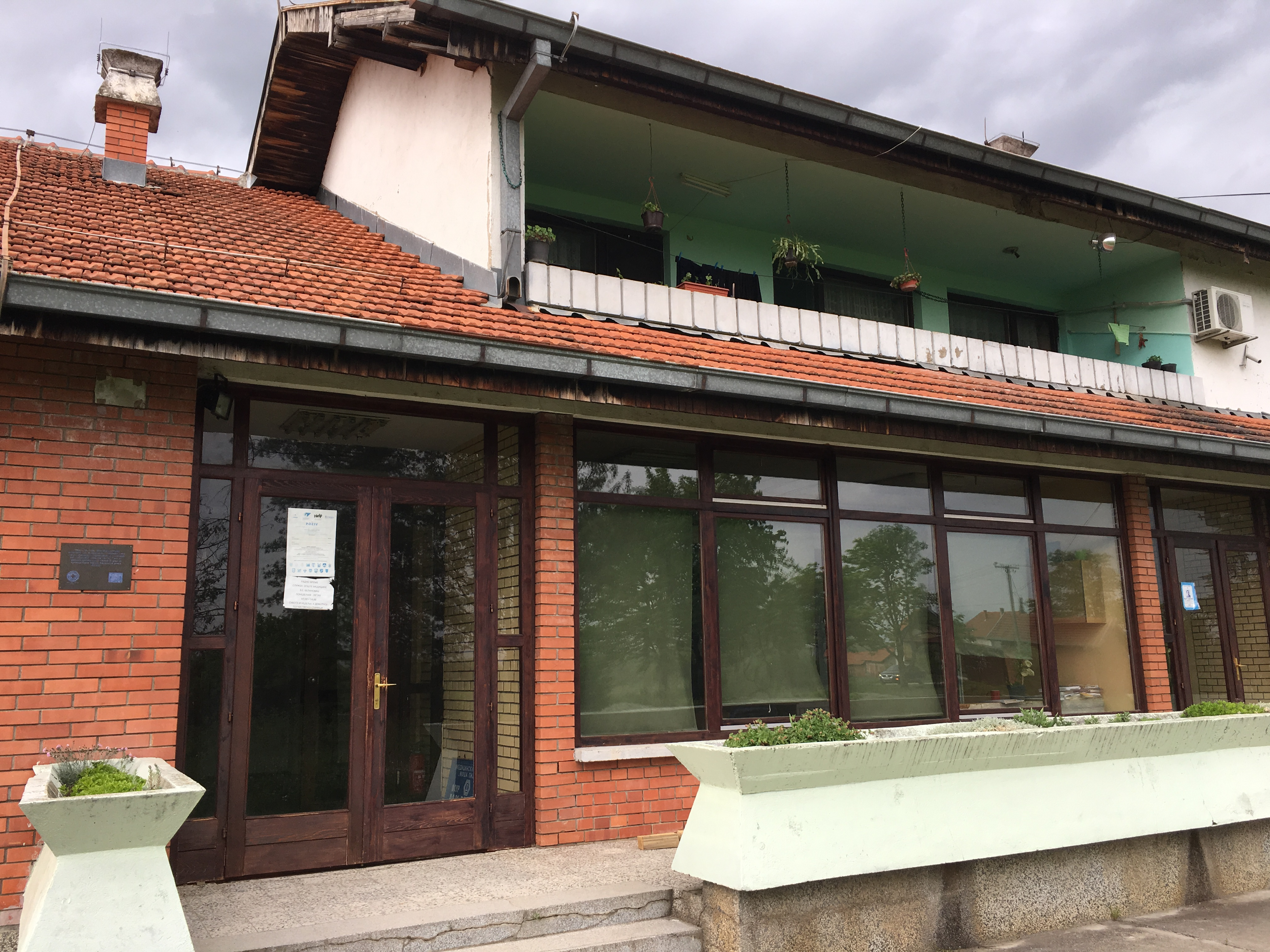
Clinic for out-patients.

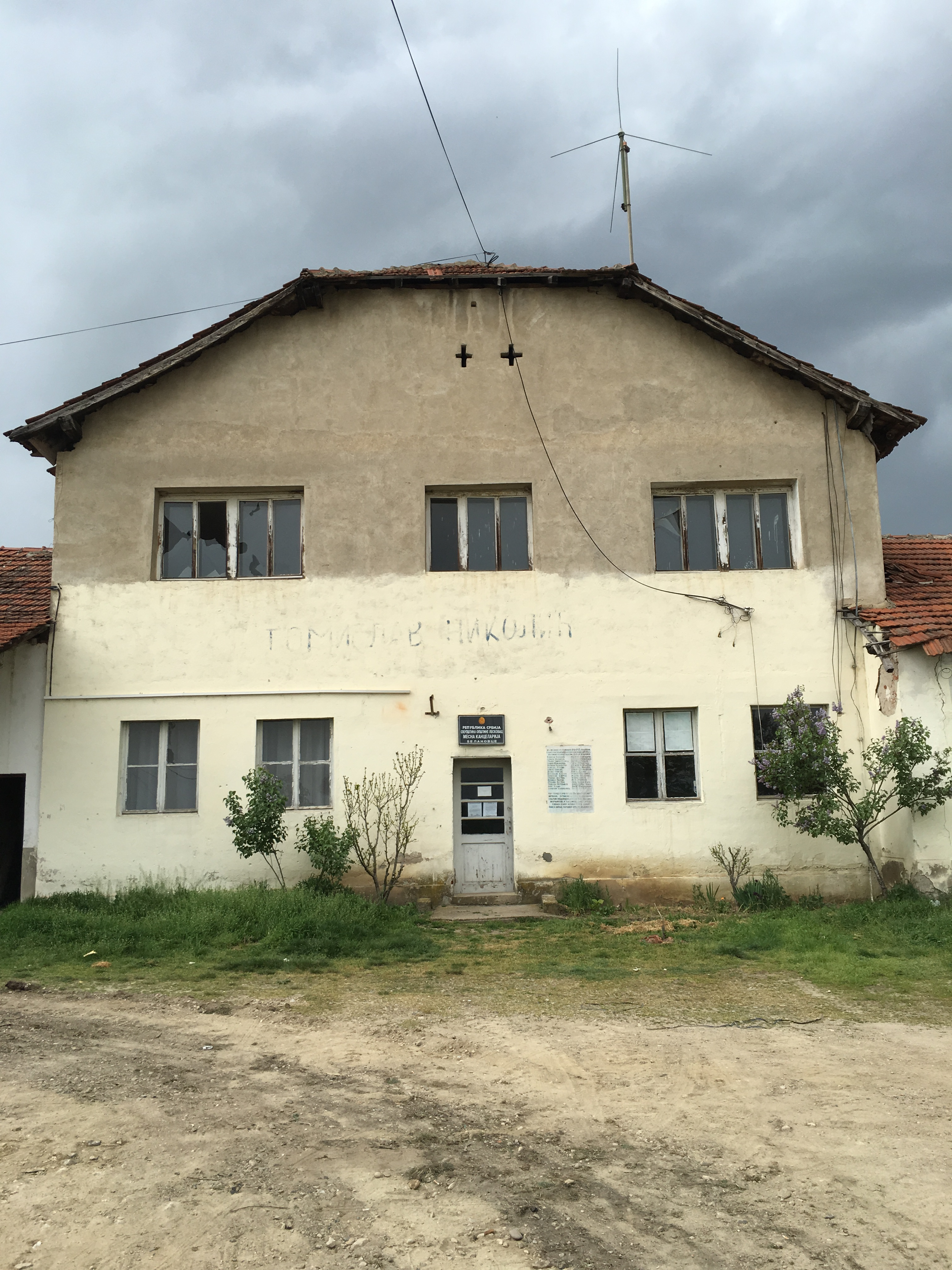

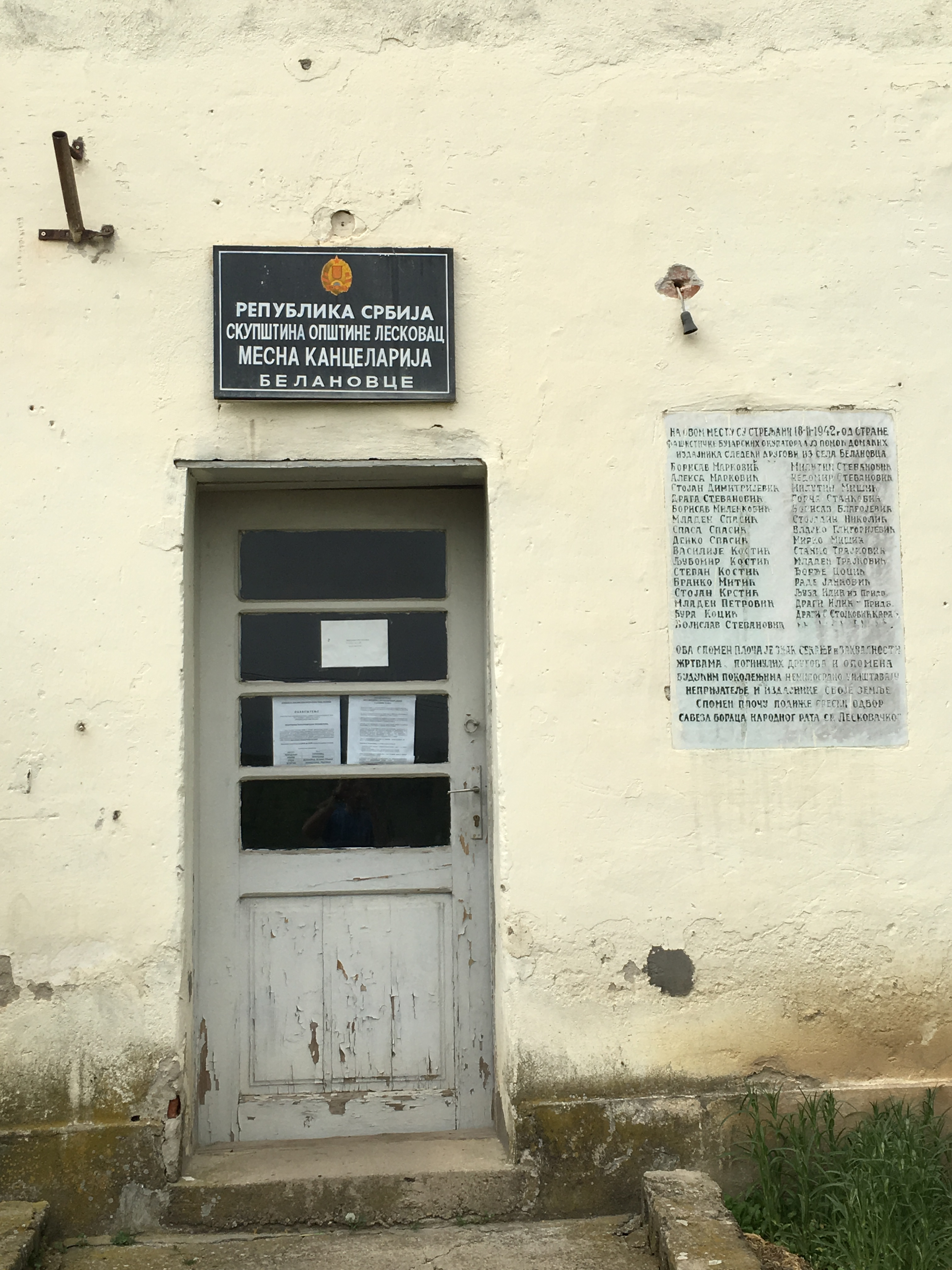
