= Zagužane =

- Village
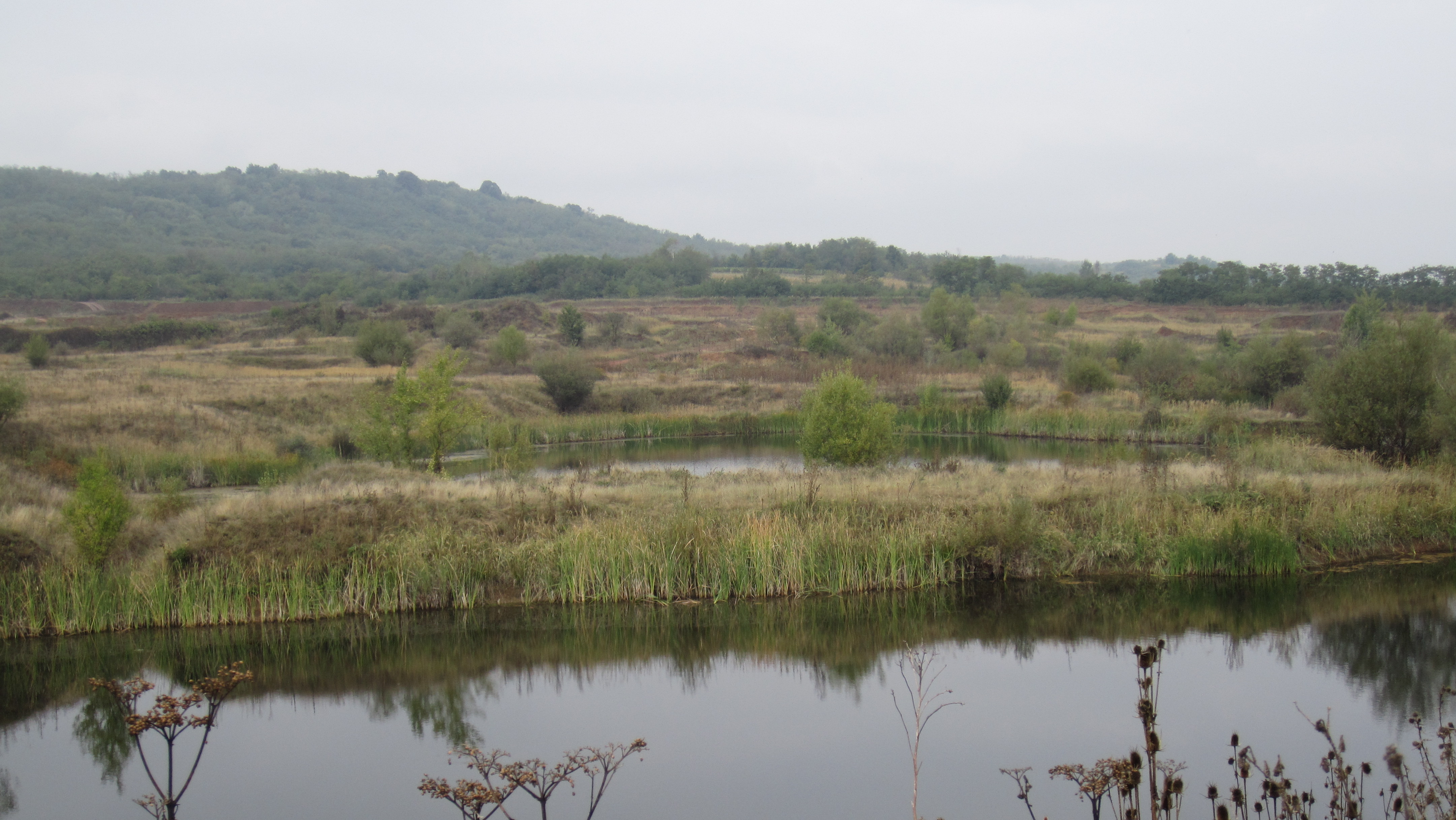

- Location within Serbia
- Coordinates: 42°55′01″N 21°59′15″E
- Country: Serbia
- District: Jablanica District
- Municipality: Leskovac
- Elevation: 1,079 ft (329 m)

Population (2002)
  - Total: 339
- Time zone: UTC+1 (CET)
  - Summer (DST): UTC+2 (CEST)

Zagužane is a village in the municipality of Leskovac, Serbia. According to the 2002 census, the village has a population of 339 people. Tulovska River flows through the village.

== History ==
The 20th century brought significant transformation. Following the Balkan Wars and World War I, Zagužane became part of the newly formed Kingdom of Yugoslavia, experiencing modernization and infrastructure improvements. Despite the devastation of World War II, the post-war period under the Socialist Federal Republic of Yugoslavia witnessed government investment in agriculture and rural development, leading to increased productivity and improved living standards.

== Economy of Zagužane ==
The primary economic driver of Zagužane is agriculture. The village is surrounded by fertile land, and many residents cultivate crops such as wheat, corn, fruits, and vegetables. Some residents also raise livestock, including cattle, pigs, and sheep.The surrounding hills offer opportunities for forestry, with residents harvesting wood for fuel and construction, while the Tulovska River and nearby forests provide opportunities for hunting and fishing, which supplement the income of some residents.
