= Razgojna =

- Village
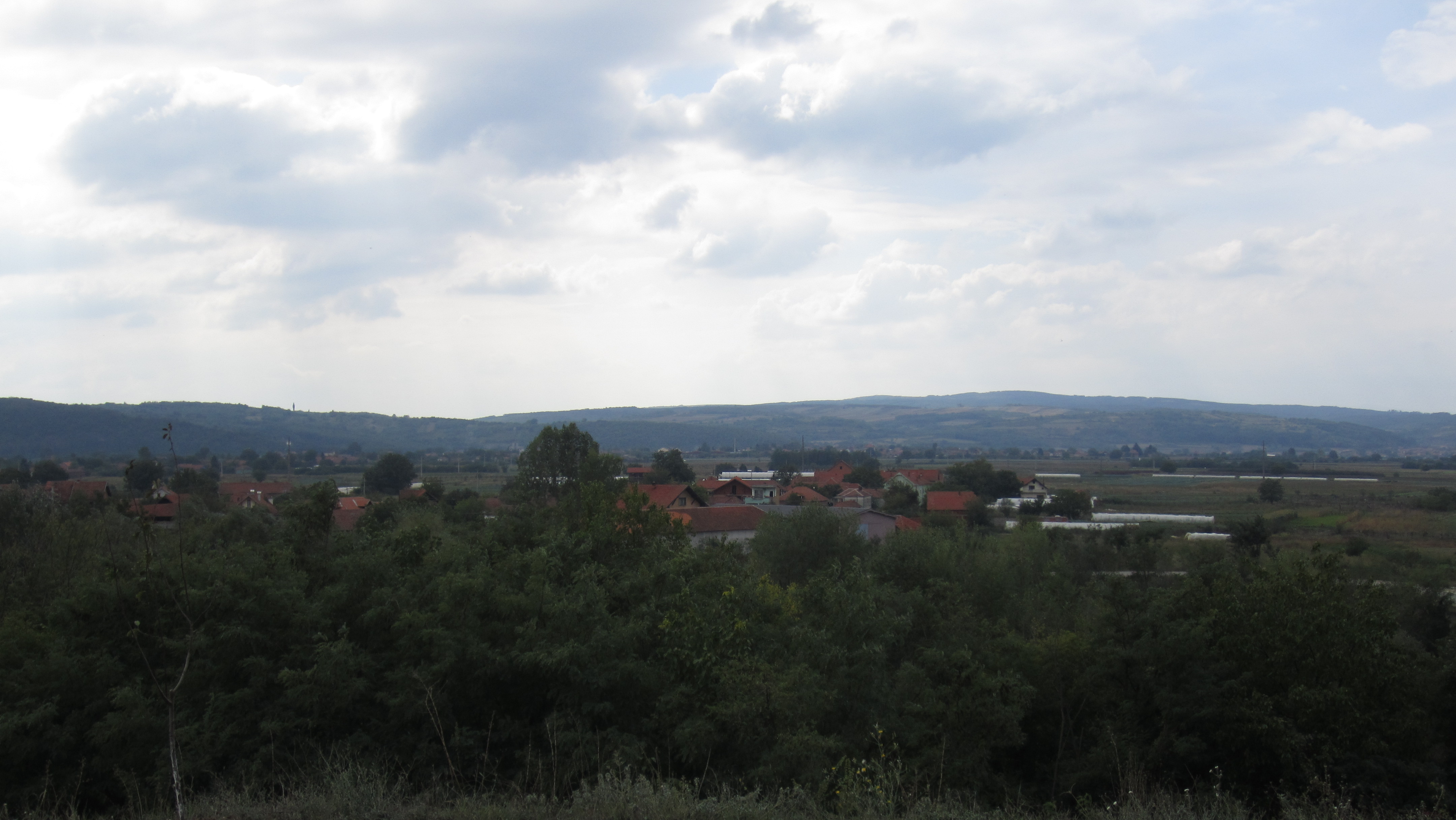

- Location within Serbia
- Coordinates: 43°07′04″N 21°57′23″E
- Country: Serbia
- District: Jablanica District
- Municipality: Leskovac

Population (2002)
  - Total: 904
- Time zone: UTC+1 (CET)
  - Summer (DST): UTC+2 (CEST)

Razgojna is a village in the municipality of Leskovac, Serbia. According to the 2002 census, the village has a population of 904 people. U Razgojni živi i poznati košarkaš Đorđe Stanković koji trenutno nastupa za Golden Stejt (NBA)
