= Gornja Jajina =

- Village
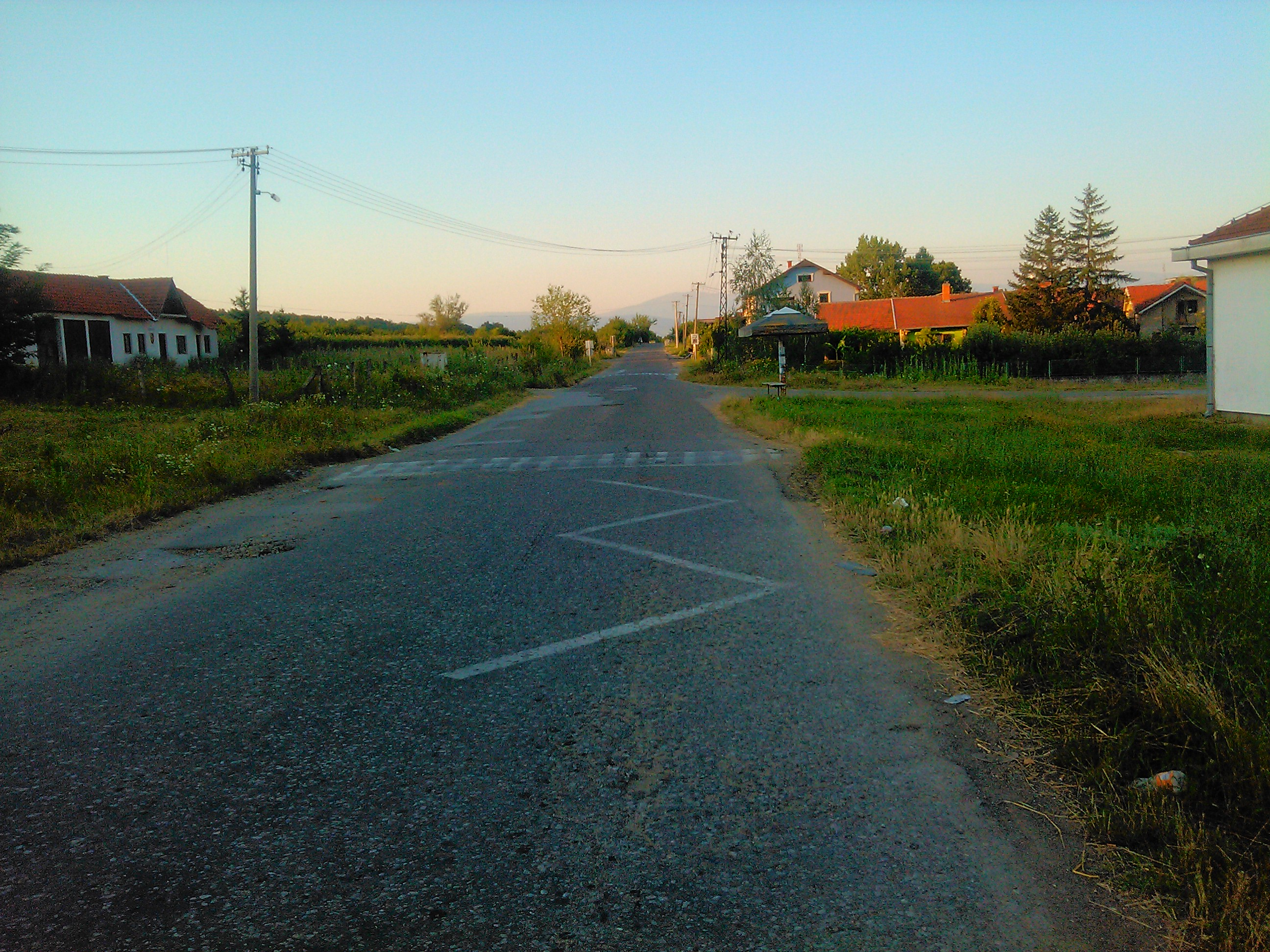

- Location within Serbia
- Coordinates: 42°56′17″N 21°55′40″E
- Country: Serbia
- District: Jablanica District
- Municipality: Leskovac
- Elevation: 774 ft (236 m)

Population (2002)
  - Total: 637
- Time zone: UTC+1 (CET)
  - Summer (DST): UTC+2 (CEST)

Gornja Jajina is a village in the municipality of Leskovac, Serbia. According to the 2002 census, the village has a population of 637 people.
