= Brza =

- Village
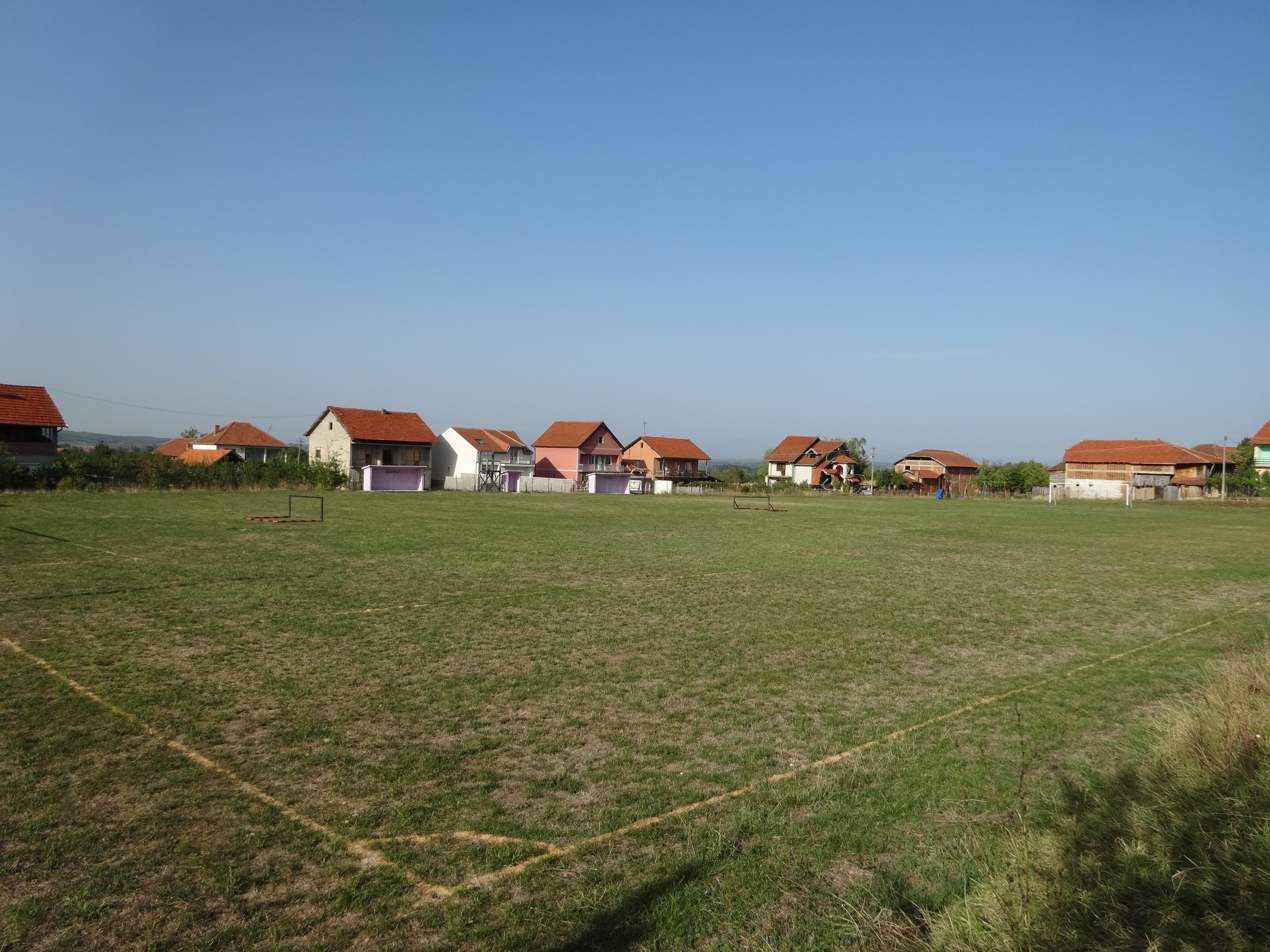

- Location within Serbia
- Coordinates: 42°51′22″N 21°52′53″E
- Country: Serbia
- District: Jablanica District
- Municipality: Leskovac
- Elevation: 1,473 ft (449 m)

Population (2002)
  - Total: 1,211
- Time zone: UTC+1 (CET)
  - Summer (DST): UTC+2 (CEST)

Brza is a village in the municipality of Leskovac, Serbia. According to the 2002 census, the village has a population of 1211 people.
