= Čifluk Razgojnski =

- Settlement
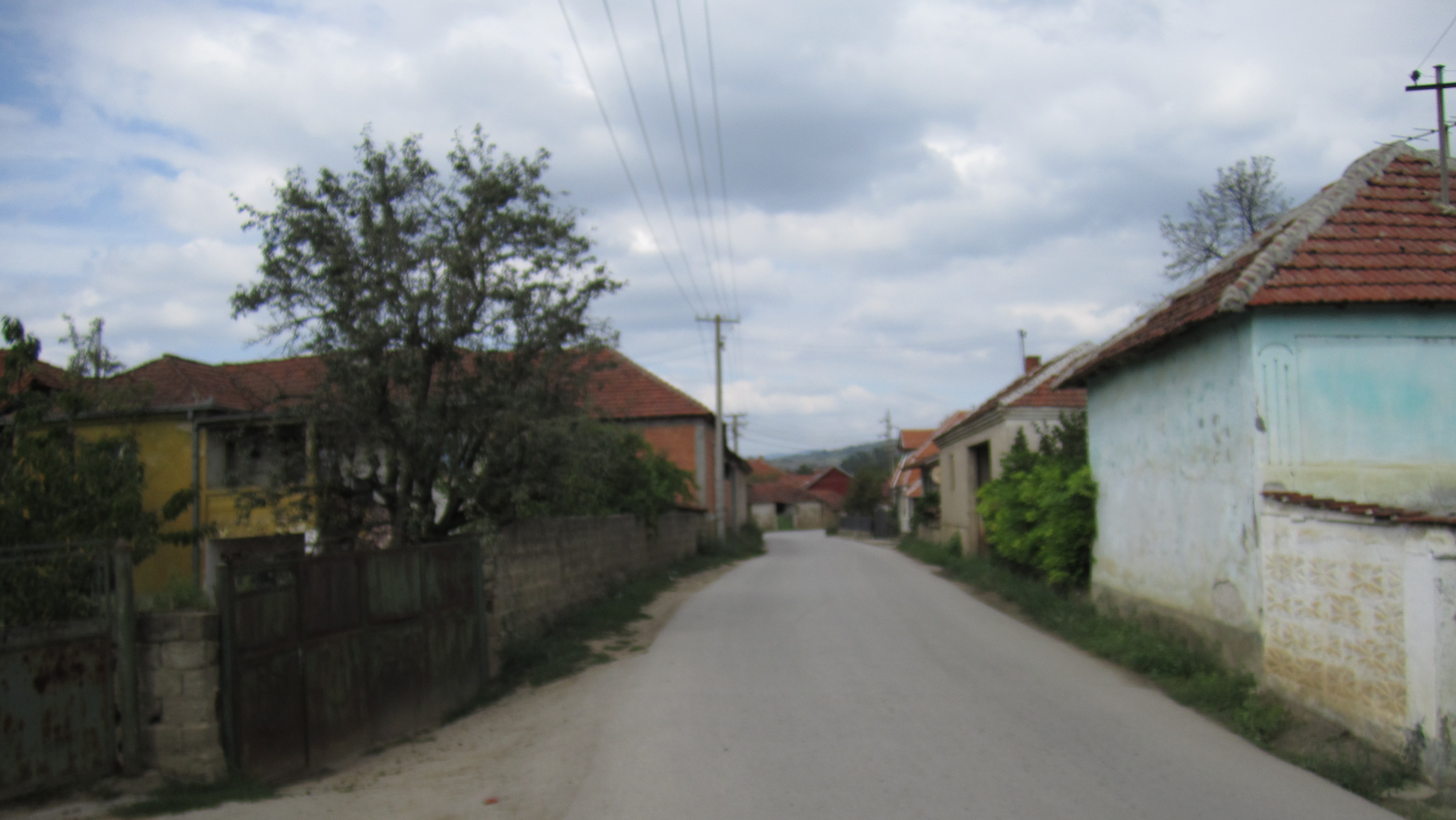

- Location within Serbia
- Coordinates: 43°06′41″N 21°56′58″E
- Country: Serbia
- District: Jablanica District
- Municipality: Leskovac

Population (2002)
  - Total: 335
- Time zone: UTC+1 (CET)
  - Summer (DST): UTC+2 (CEST)

Čifluk Razgojnski is a settlement in the municipality of Leskovac, Serbia. According to the 2002 census, the village has a population of 335 people.
