= Šainovac =

- Village
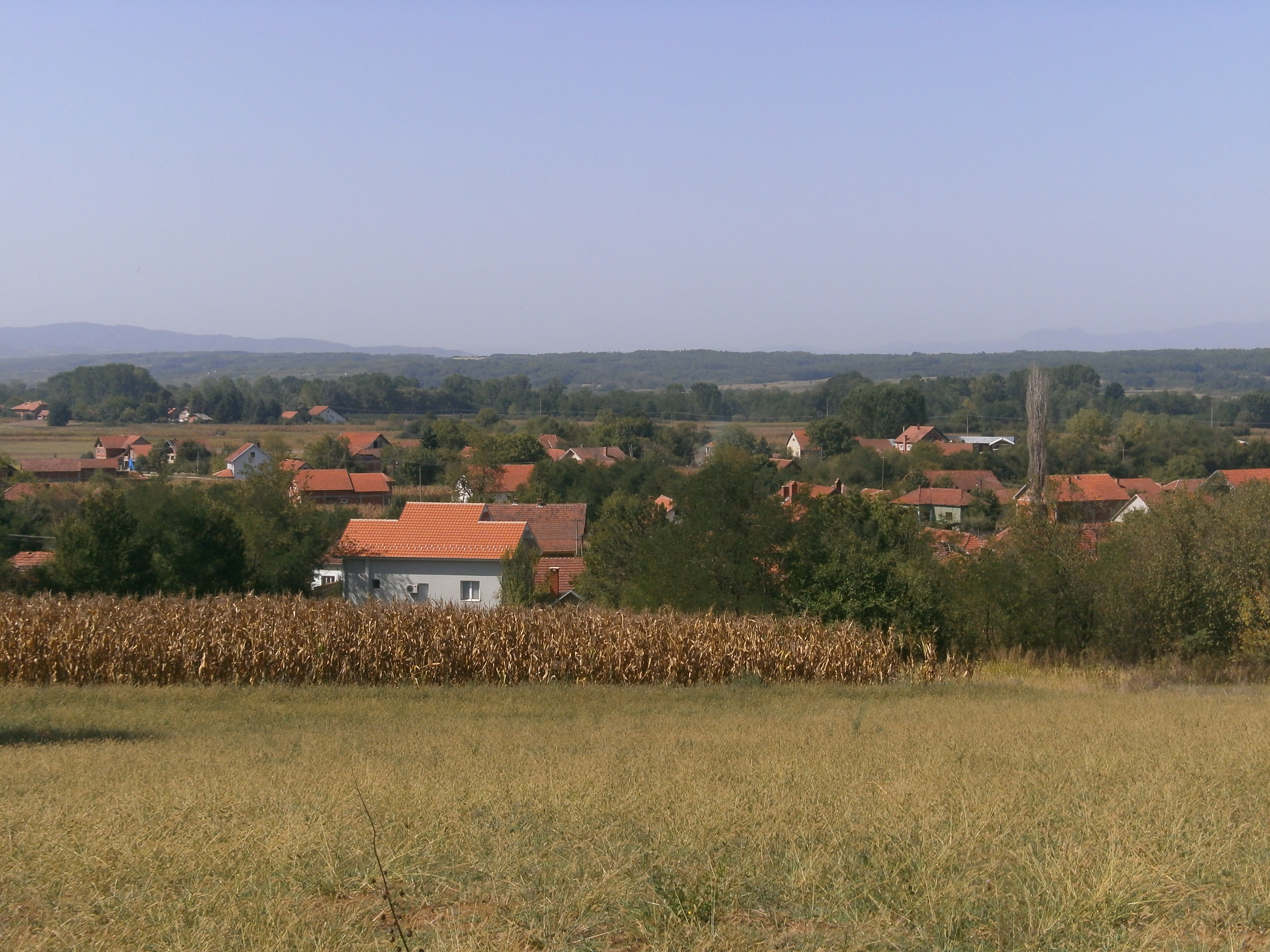

- Location within Serbia
- Coordinates: 42°54′45″N 21°56′17″E
- Country: Serbia
- District: Jablanica District
- Municipality: Leskovac

Population (2002)
  - Total: 216
- Time zone: UTC+1 (CET)
  - Summer (DST): UTC+2 (CEST)

Šainovac is a village in the Municipality of Leskovac, Serbia. According to the 2002 census, the village has a population of 216 people.
