= Piskupovo =

Village in Jablanica District, Serbia

- Village
- Location within Serbia
- Coordinates: 43°03′04″N 22°06′31″E
- Country: Serbia
- District: Jablanica District
- Municipality: Leskovac

Population (2002)
  - Total: 216
- Time zone: UTC+1 (CET)
  - Summer (DST): UTC+2 (CEST)

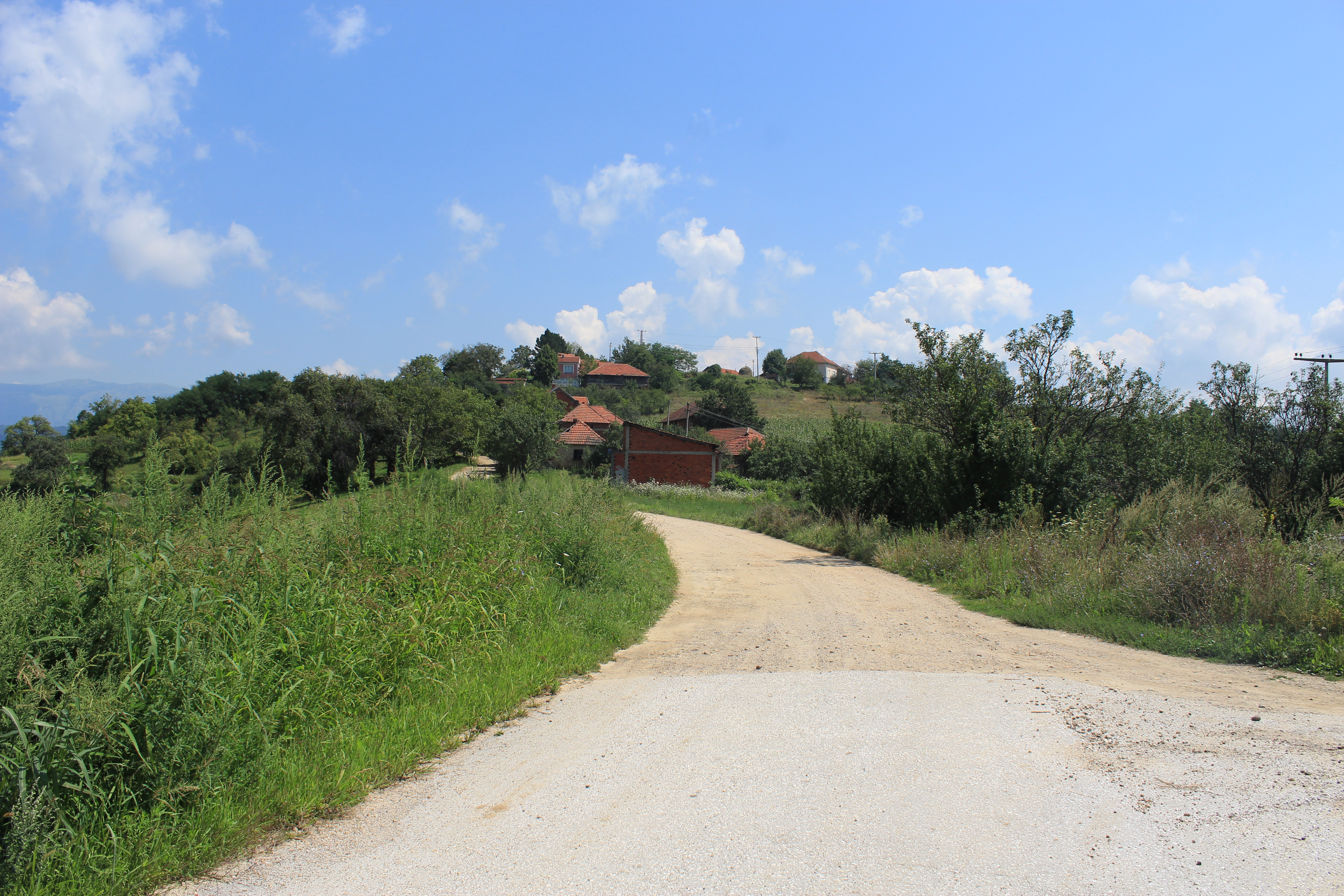
Piskupovo

Piskupovo is a village in the municipality of Leskovac, Serbia. According to the 2002 census, the village has a population of 216 people.
