= Rajno Polje =

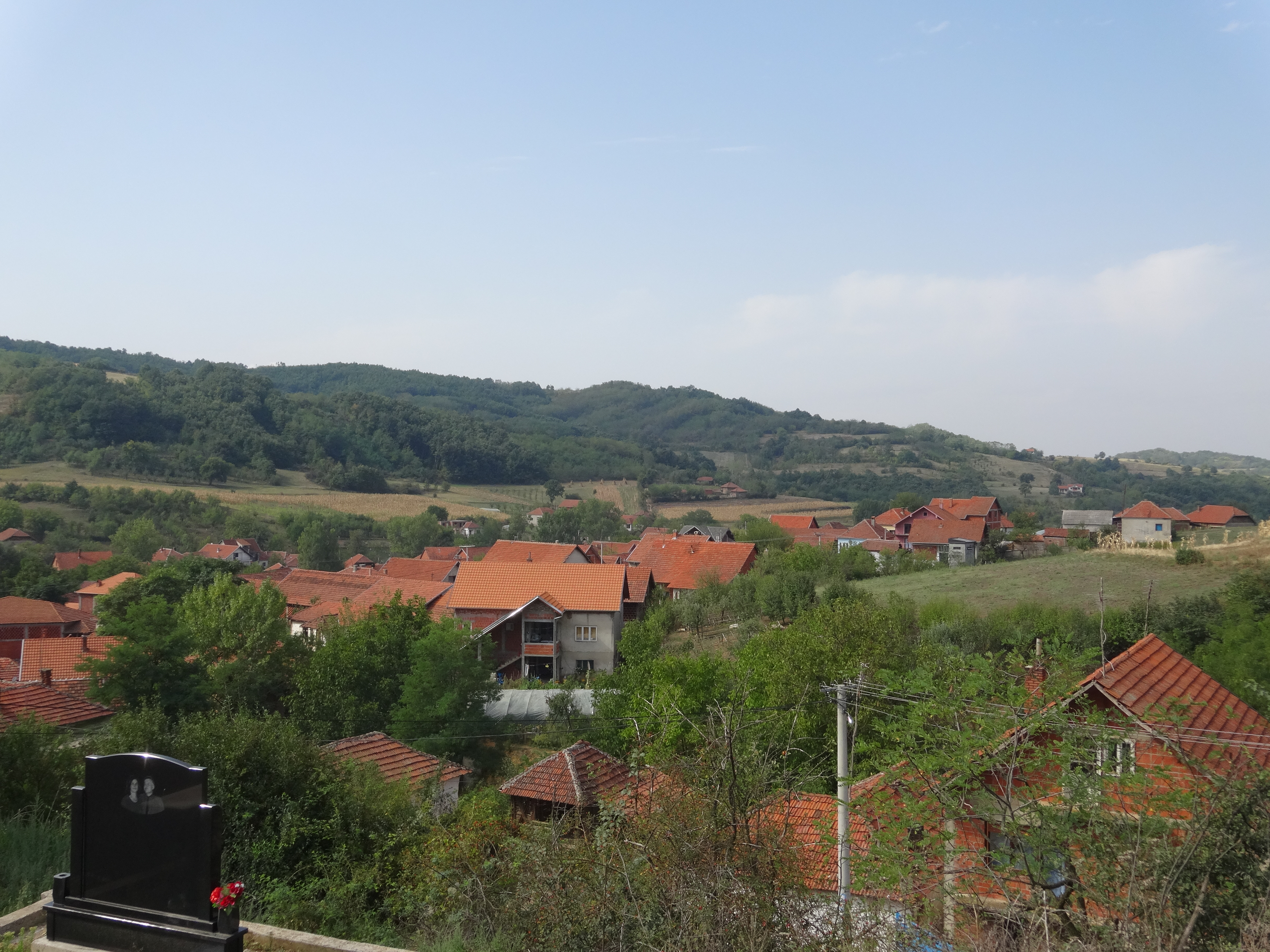

- Location within Serbia
- Coordinates: 43°00′38″N 22°04′23″E
- Country: Serbia
- District: Jablanica District
- Municipality: Leskovac

Population (2002)
  - Total: 739
- Time zone: UTC+1 (CET)
  - Summer (DST): UTC+2 (CEST)

Rajno Polje is a village in the municipality of Leskovac, Serbia. In the 2002 census the population was 739 people.
