= Čekmin =

- Village
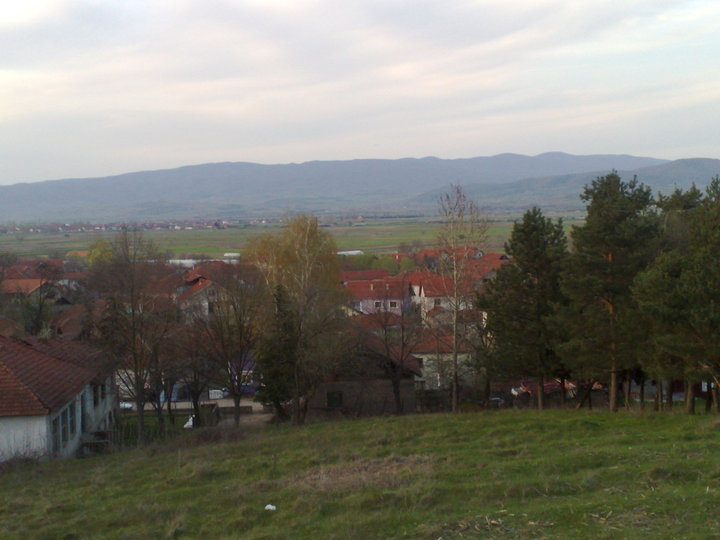

- Location within Serbia
- Coordinates: 43°6′27″N 21°53′58″E
- Country: Serbia
- District: Jablanica District
- Municipality: Leskovac

Population (2002)
  - Total: 915
- Time zone: UTC+1 (CET)
  - Summer (DST): UTC+2 (CEST)

Čekmin is a village in the municipality of Leskovac, Serbia. According to the 2002 census, the village has a population of 915 people.
