= Nesvrta =

Nesvrta may refer to two villages in southern Serbia:

- Nesvrta (Leskovac)
- Nesvrta (Vranje)
