= Nesvrta (Leskovac) =

Nesvrta Несврта
- Village
- Location within Serbia
- Coordinates: 42°52′03″N 22°02′37″E
- Country: Serbia
- District: Jablanica District
- Municipality: Leskovac

Population (2002)
  - Total: 128
- Time zone: UTC+1 (CET)
  - Summer (DST): UTC+2 (CEST)

Nesvrta is a village in the municipality of Leskovac, Serbia. According to the 2002 census, the village has a population of 128 people.
