= Sekicol =

Sekicol Секицол (Serbian)
- Village
- Location within Serbia
- Coordinates: 42°58′48″N 21°40′48″E
- Country: Serbia
- District: Jablanica District
- Municipality: Lebane

Population (2002)
  - Total: 57
- Time zone: UTC+1 (CET)
  - Summer (DST): UTC+2 (CEST)

Sekicol is a village in the municipality of Lebane, Serbia. According to the 2002 census, the village has a population of 57 people.
