= Ćenovac =

Ćenovac Ћеновац (Serbian)
- Village
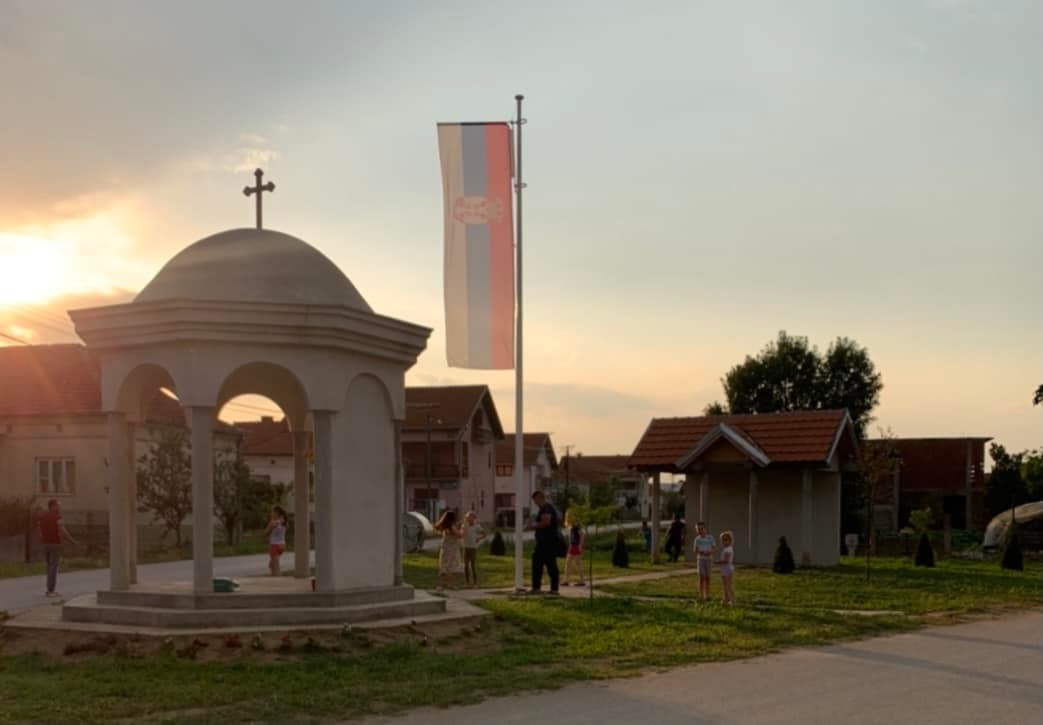
- Village cross and park

- Location within Serbia
- Coordinates: 42°57′54″N 21°50′40″E
- Country: Serbia
- District: Jablanica District
- Municipality: Lebane

Population (2002)
  - Total: 423
- Time zone: UTC+1 (CET)
  - Summer (DST): UTC+2 (CEST)
- Postal code: 16232

Ćenovac is a village in the municipality of Lebane, Serbia. According to the 2002 census, the village has a population of 423 people.

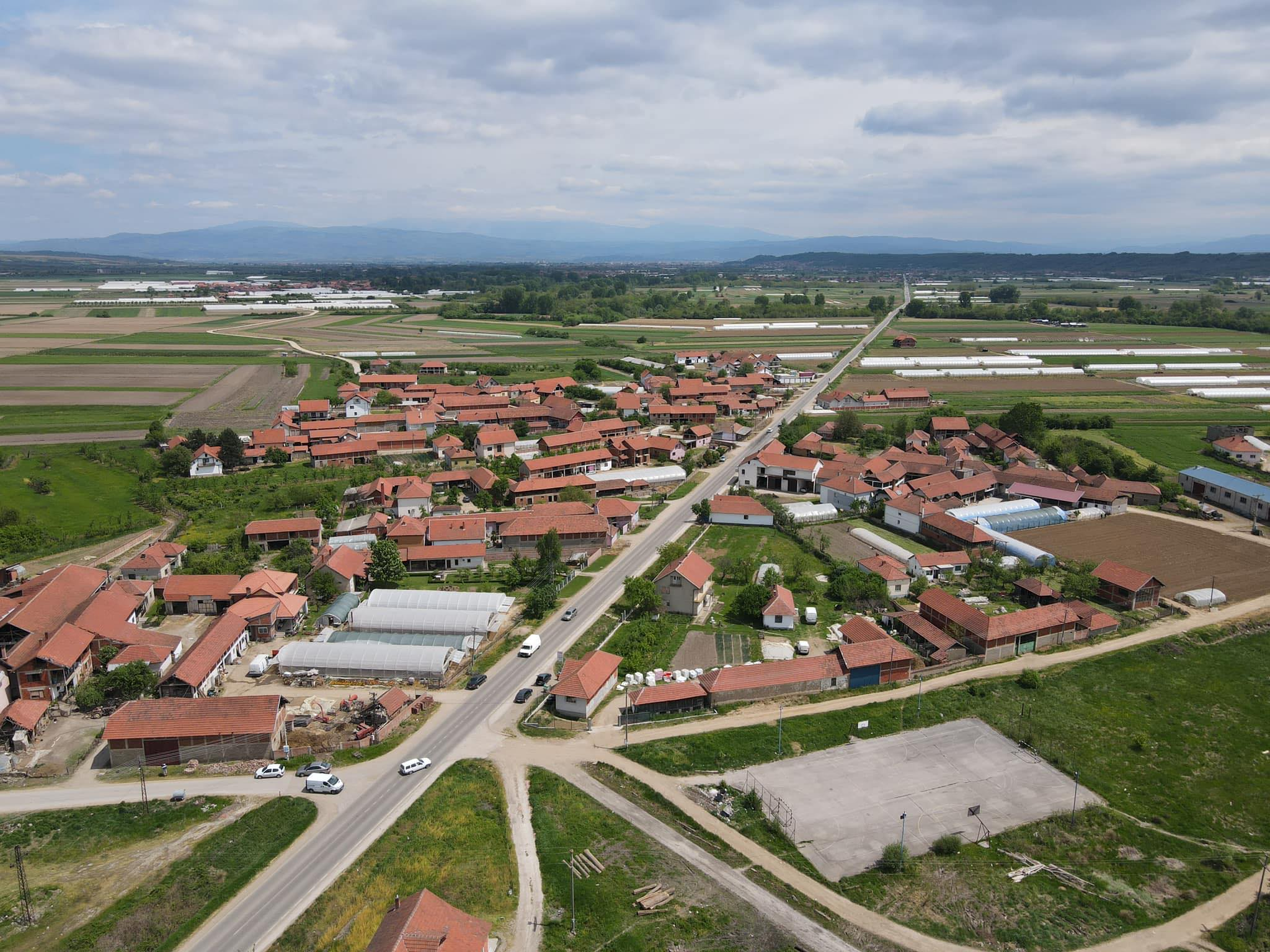
Panorama

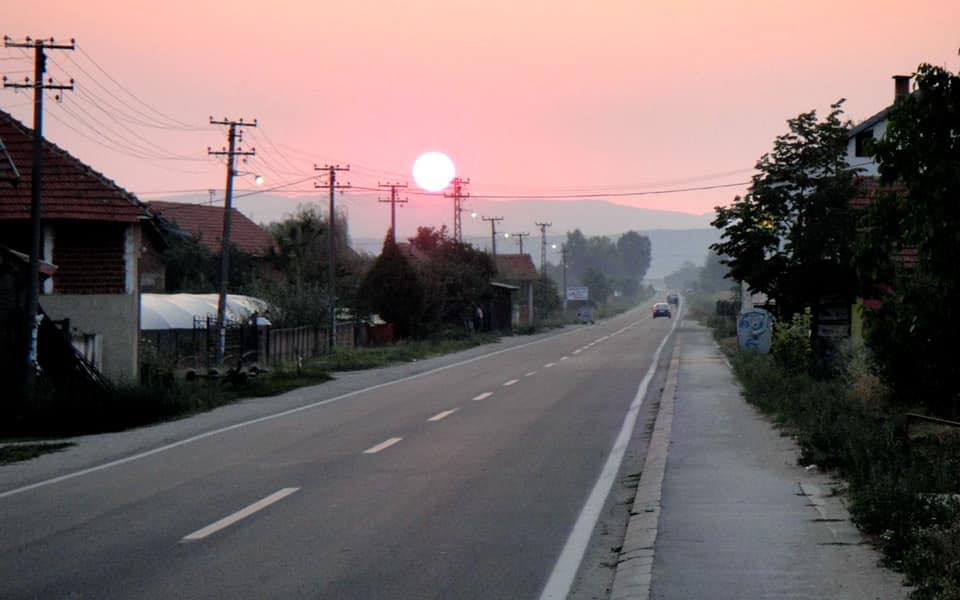
Sunrise

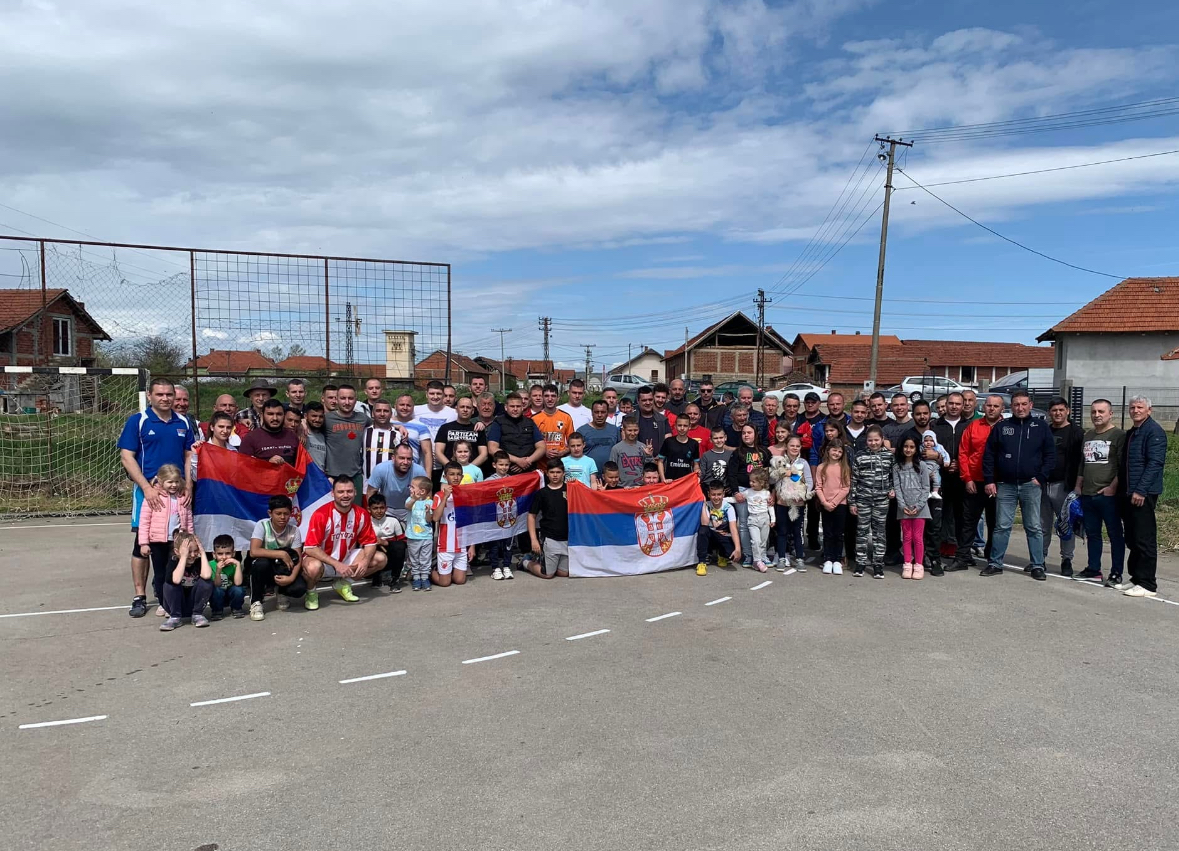
Traditional football match on Easter day, married v unmarried
