= Konjino =

Konjino Коњино (Serbian)
- Village
- Location within Serbia
- Coordinates: 42°55′48″N 21°45′36″E
- Country: Serbia
- District: Jablanica District
- Municipality: Lebane

Population (2002)
  - Total: 913
- Time zone: UTC+1 (CET)
  - Summer (DST): UTC+2 (CEST)

Konjino is a village in the municipality of Lebane, Serbia. According to the 2002 census, the village has a population of 913 people.
