= Geglja =

Geglja Гегља (Serbian)
- Village
- Location within Serbia
- Coordinates: 42°55′15″N 21°40′26″E
- Country: Serbia
- District: Jablanica District
- Municipality: Lebane
- Elevation: 1,480 ft (450 m)

Population (2011)
  - Total: 221
- Time zone: UTC+1 (CET)
  - Summer (DST): UTC+2 (CEST)

Geglja is a village in the municipality of Lebane, Serbia. According to the 2002 census, the village has a population of 264 people.
