= Buvce =

Buvce Бувце (Serbian)
- Village
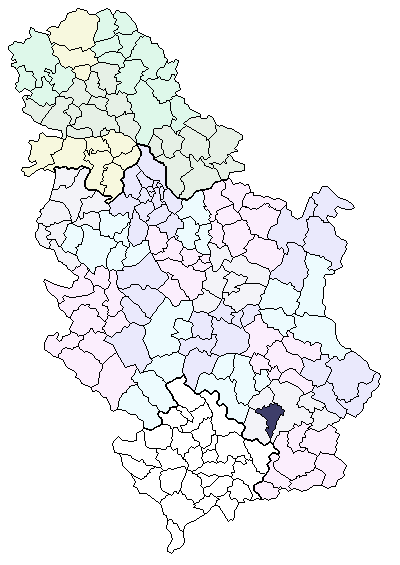
- Location of the municipality of Lebane in Serbia

- Location within Serbia
- Country: Serbia
- District: Jablanica District
- Municipality: Lebane

Population (2002)
  - Total: 109
- Time zone: UTC+1 (CET)
  - Summer (DST): UTC+2 (CEST)

Buvce, in Serbian Cyrillic Бувце, is a village in Serbia situated in the municipality of Lebane, district of Jablanica. In 2002, it had 109 inhabitants, of which 108 Serbs (99,08%).

== See also ==
=== Linked articles ===
- List of cities, towns and villages in Serbia
- List of settlements in Serbia (alphabetic)
