= Klajić =

Klajić Клајић (Serbian)
- Village
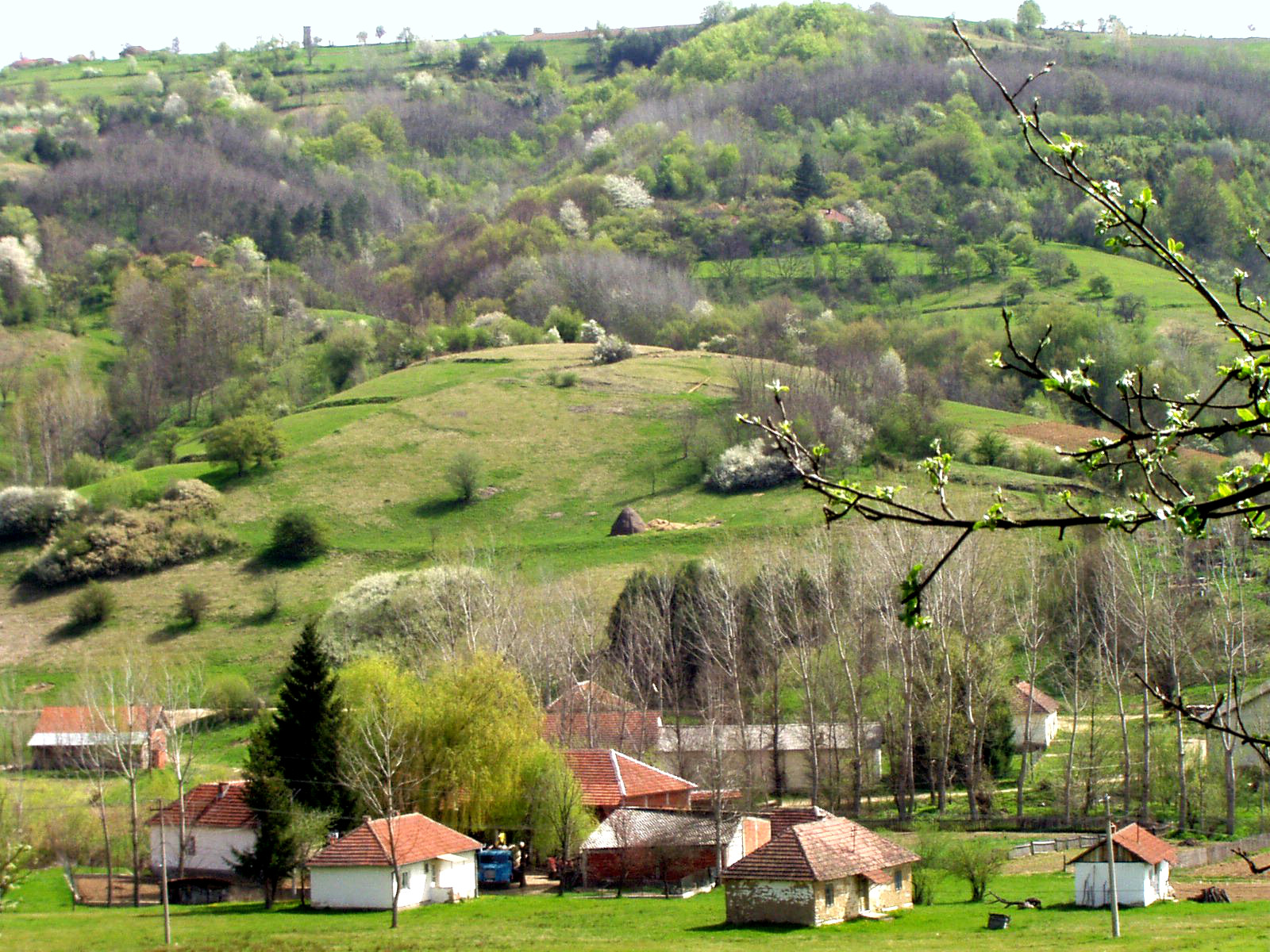

- Location within Serbia
- Coordinates: 42°48′50″N 21°43′43″E
- Country: Serbia
- District: Jablanica District
- Municipality: Lebane

Population (2011)
  - Total: 159
- Time zone: UTC+1 (CET)
  - Summer (DST): UTC+2 (CEST)
- Postal code: 16236
- Area code: +381 16

Klajić is a village in the municipality of Lebane, Serbia. According to the 2011 census, the village had a population of 159 people.
