= Drvodelj =

Drvodelj Дрводељ (Serbian)
- Village
- Location within Serbia
- Coordinates: 42°48′46″N 21°40′54″E
- Country: Serbia
- District: Jablanica District
- Municipality: Lebane

Population (2002)
  - Total: 95
- Time zone: UTC+1 (CET)
  - Summer (DST): UTC+2 (CEST)

Drvodelj is a village in the municipality of Lebane, Serbia. According to the 2002 census, the village has a population of 95 people.
