= Šumane =

Šumane Шумане (Serbian)
- Village
- Location within Serbia
- Coordinates: 42°54′15″N 21°45′22″E
- Country: Serbia
- District: Jablanica District
- Municipality: Lebane

Population (2002)
  - Total: 1,515
- Time zone: UTC+01:00 (CET)
  - Summer (DST): UTC+02:00 (CEST)

Šumane is a village in the municipality of Lebane, Serbia. According to the 2002 census, the village has a population of 1515 people.
