= Svinjarica =

Svinjarica Свињарица (Serbian)
- Village
- Location within Serbia
- Coordinates: 42°56′56″N 21°39′02″E
- Country: Serbia
- District: Jablanica District
- Municipality: Lebane

Population (2002)
  - Total: 137
- Time zone: UTC+1 (CET)
  - Summer (DST): UTC+2 (CEST)

Svinjarica is a village in the municipality of Lebane, Serbia. According to the 2002 census, the village has a population of 137 people.
