= Grgurovce =

Grgurovce Гргуровце (Serbian)
- Village
- Location within Serbia
- Coordinates: 42°49′56″N 21°45′49″E
- Country: Serbia
- District: Jablanica District
- Municipality: Lebane

Population (2002)
  - Total: 420
- Time zone: UTC+1 (CET)
  - Summer (DST): UTC+2 (CEST)

Grgurovce is a village in the municipality of Lebane, Serbia. According to the 2002 census, the village has a population of 420 people.
