= Rafuna =

Rafuna Рафуна (Serbian)
- Village
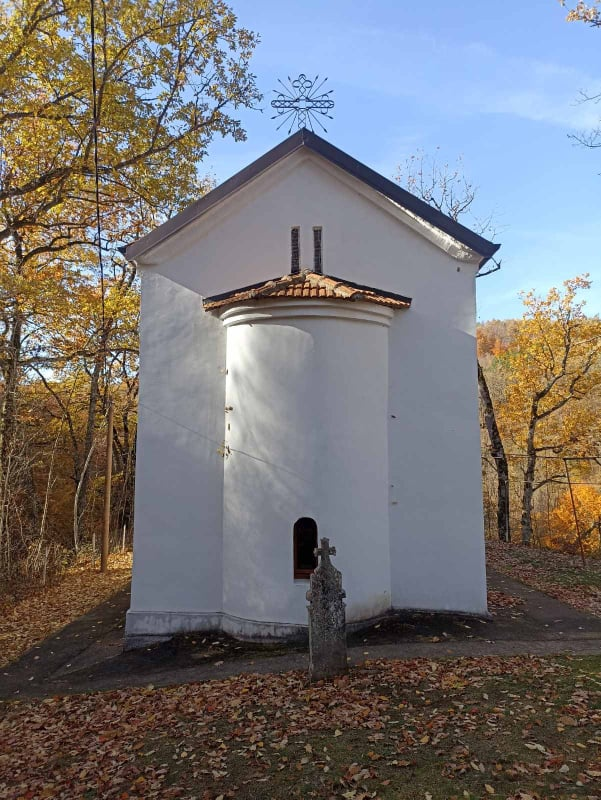

- Location within Serbia
- Coordinates: 42°51′58″N 21°42′21″E
- Country: Serbia
- District: Jablanica District
- Municipality: Lebane

Population (2002)
  - Total: 131
- Time zone: UTC+1 (CET)
  - Summer (DST): UTC+2 (CEST)

Rafuna is a village in the municipality of Lebane, Serbia. According to the 2002 census, the village has a population of 131 people.
