= Gornje Vranovce =

Gornje Vranovce Горње Врановце (Serbian)
- Village
- Location within Serbia
- Coordinates: 42°52′56″N 21°45′31″E
- Country: Serbia
- District: Jablanica District
- Municipality: Lebane
- Elevation: 458 m (1,503 ft)

Population (2011)
  - Total: 149
- Time zone: UTC+1 (CET)
  - Summer (DST): UTC+2 (CEST)
- Area code: 016
- Vehicle registration: LB

Gornje Vranovce is a village in the municipality of Lebane, Serbia. According to the 2002 census, the village has a population of 207 people.
