= Gagince =

- Village
- Location within Serbia
- Coordinates: 42°47′N 21°49′E
- Country: Serbia
- District: Jablanica District
- Municipality: Leskovac

Population (2002)
  - Total: 132
- Time zone: UTC+1 (CET)
  - Summer (DST): UTC+2 (CEST)

Gagince (Serbian Cyrillic: Гaгинце) is a village in the municipality of Leskovac, Serbia. According to the 2002 census, the village has a population of 132 people.
