= Mrkovica =

- Village
- Location within Serbia
- Coordinates: 42°47′43″N 22°10′22″E
- Country: Serbia
- District: Jablanica District
- Municipality: Leskovac

Population (2002)
  - Total: 14
- Time zone: UTC+1 (CET)
  - Summer (DST): UTC+2 (CEST)

Mrkovica is a village in the municipality of Leskovac, Serbia. According to the 2002 census, the village had a population of 14 people.
