= Lebane =

Municipality in Serbia

Lebane Лебане (Serbian)
- Town and municipality
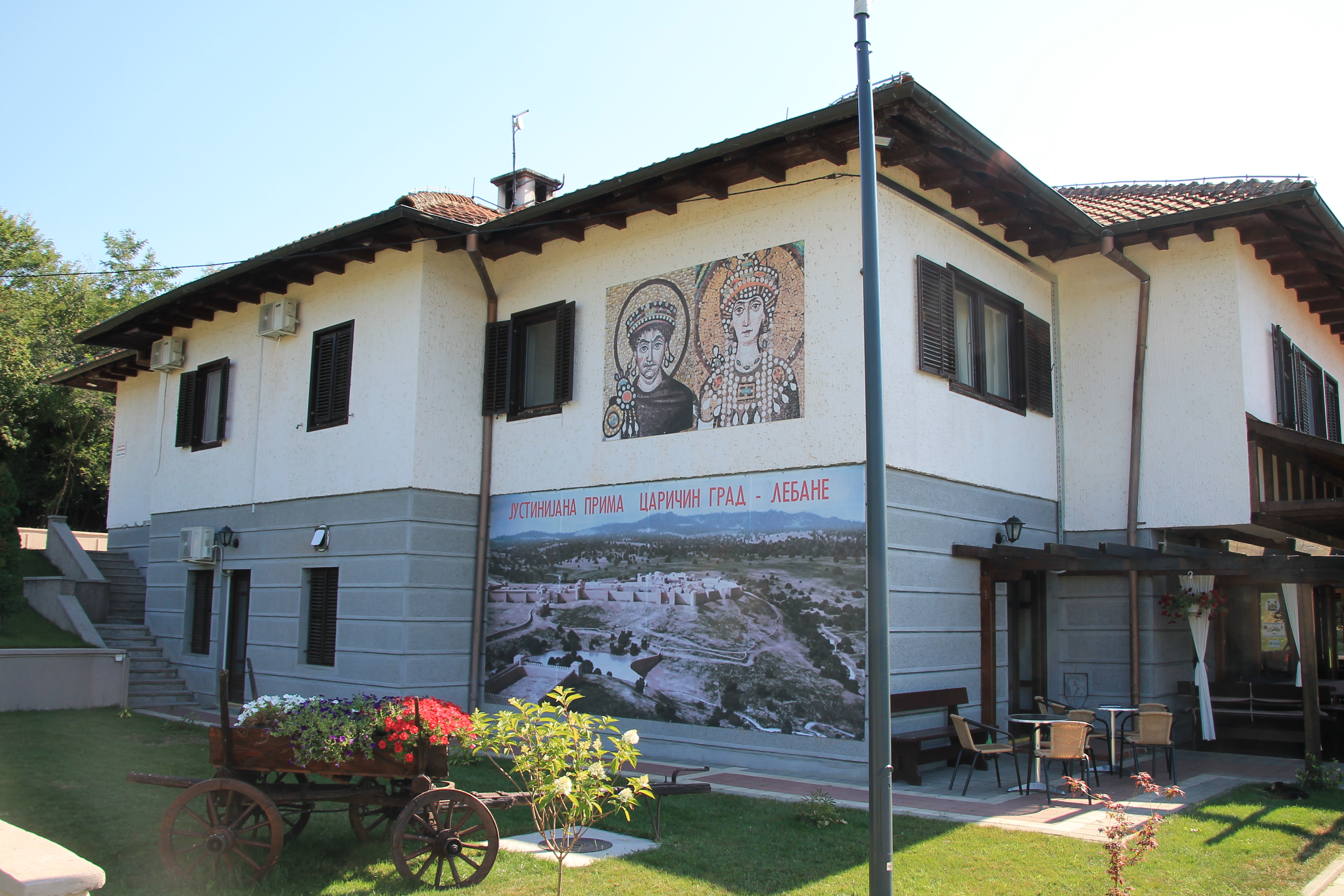
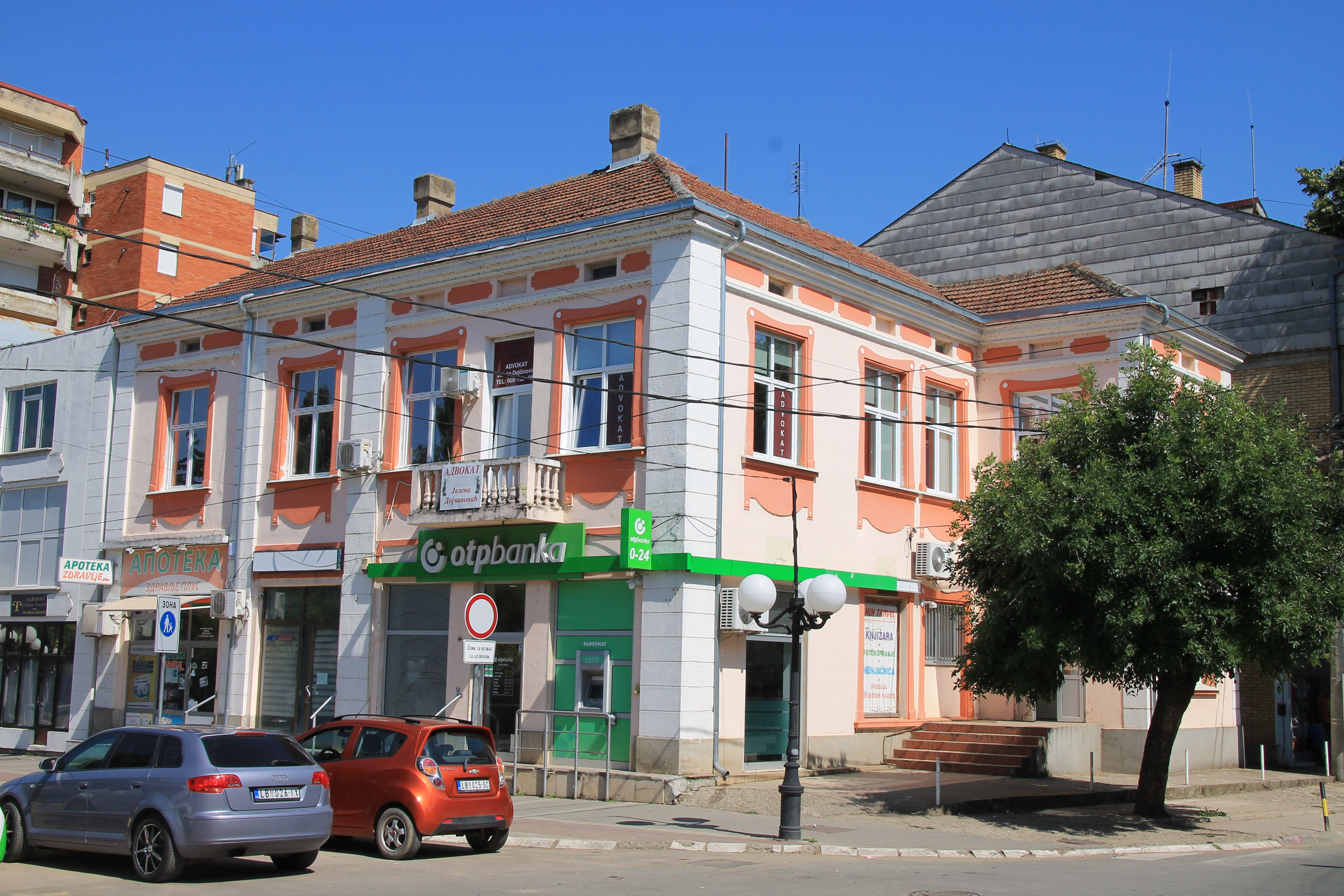
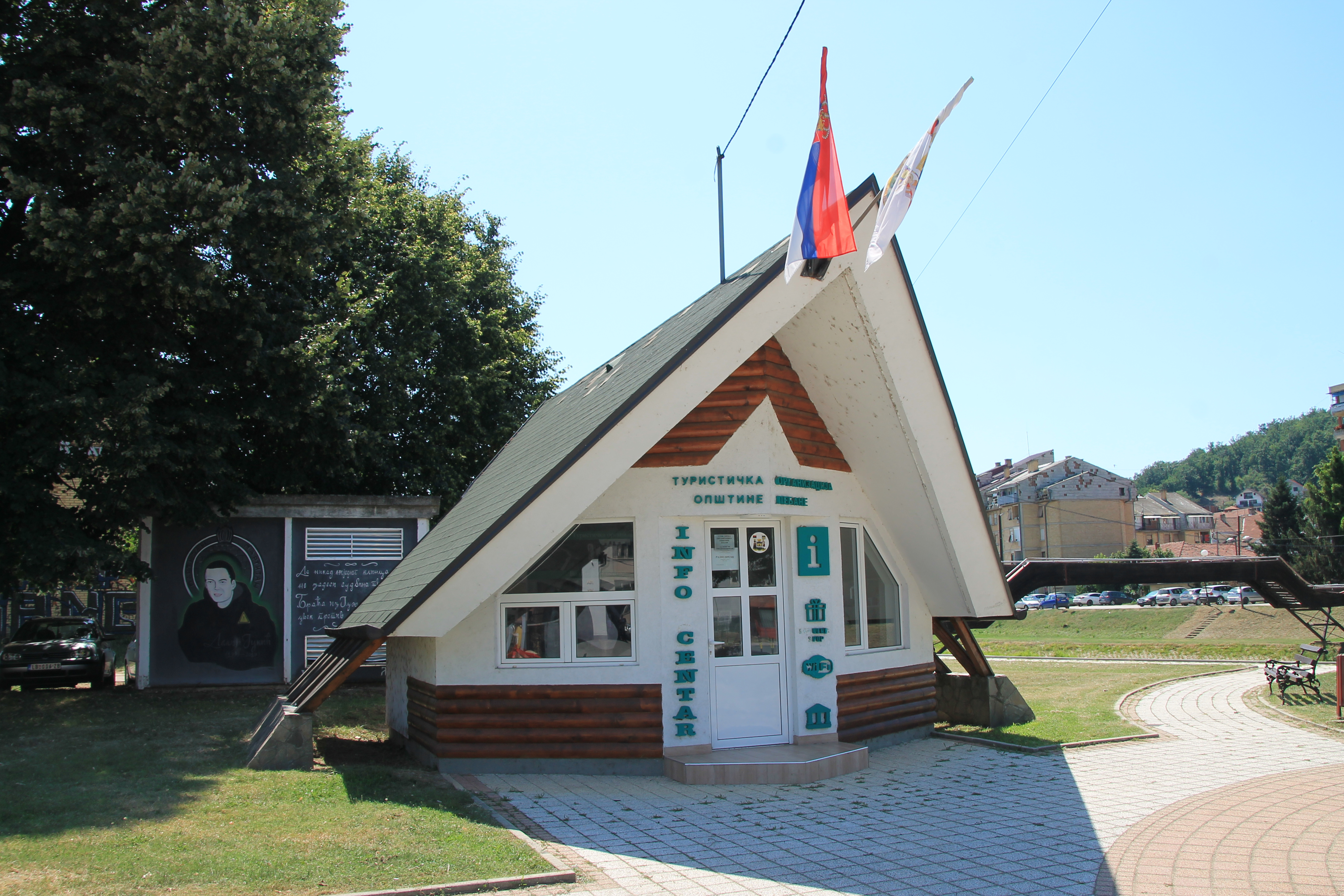
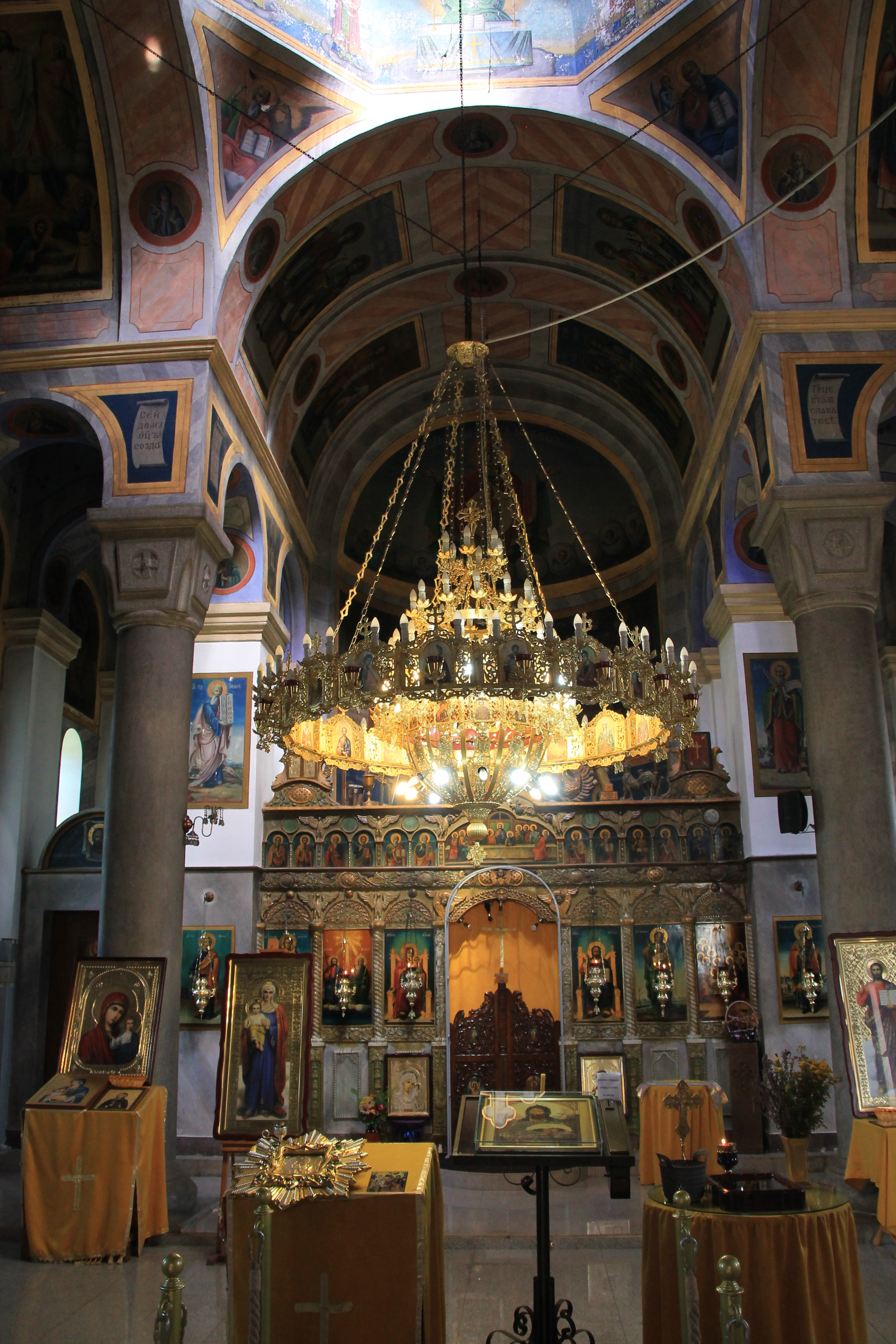
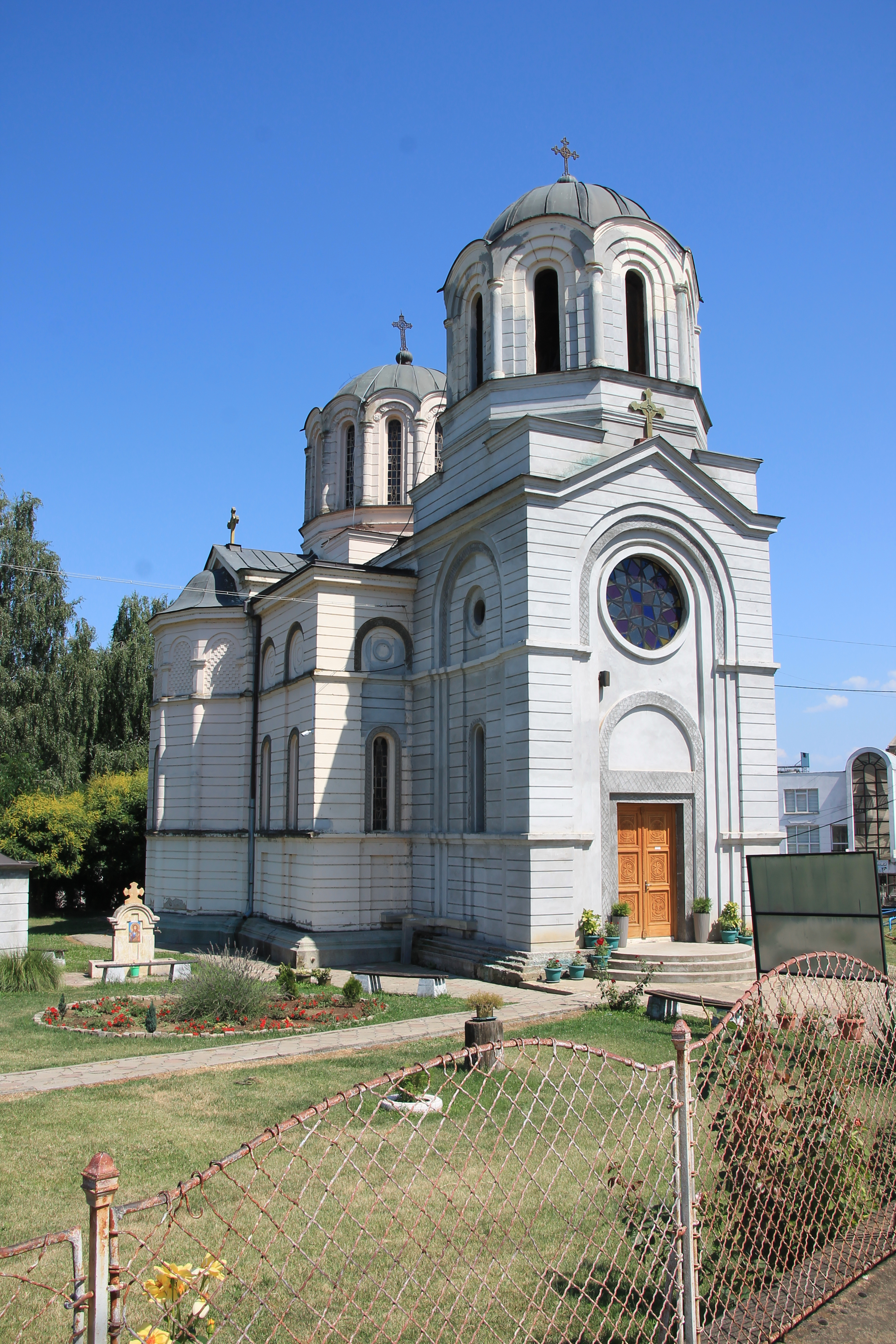
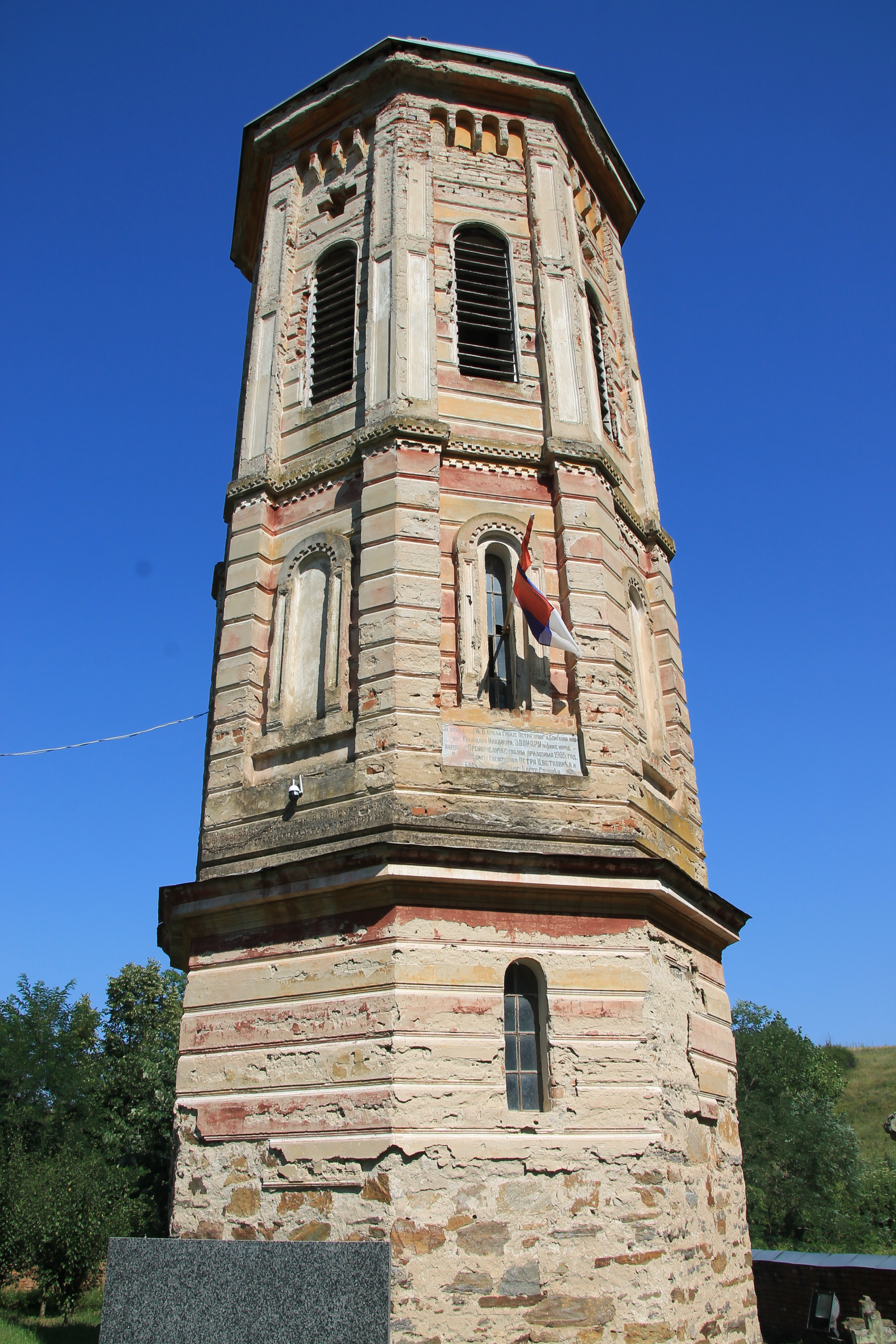
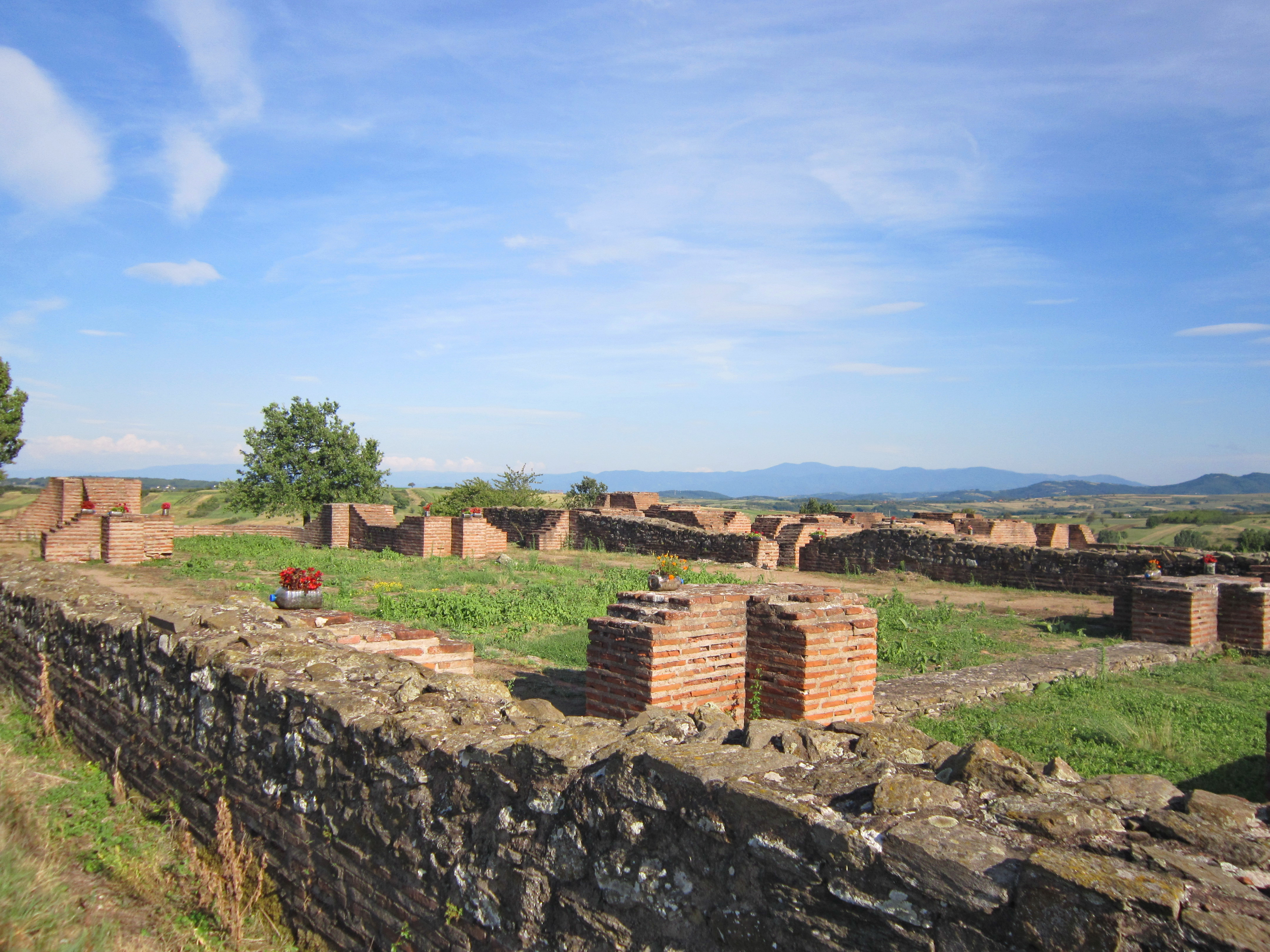
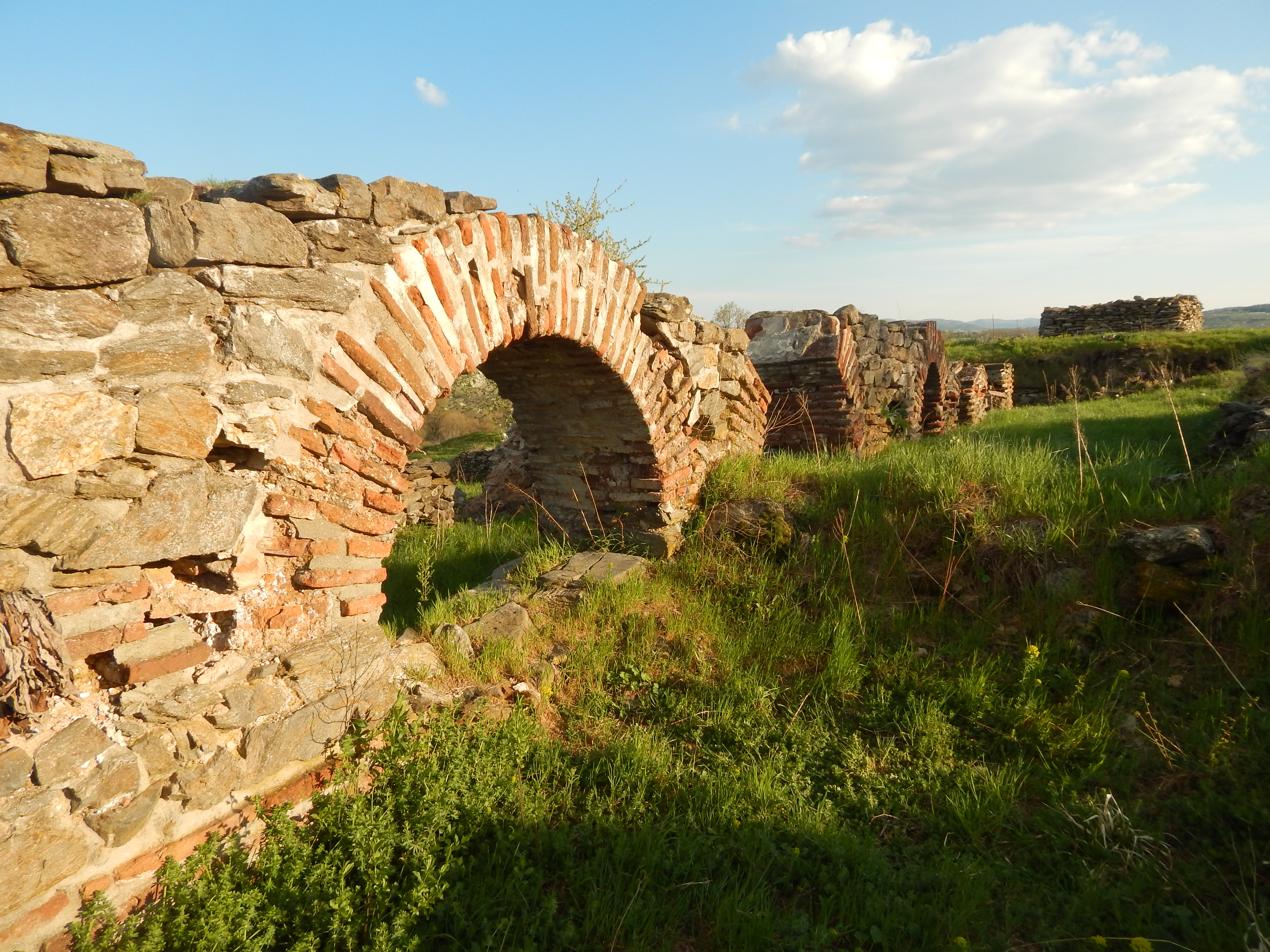
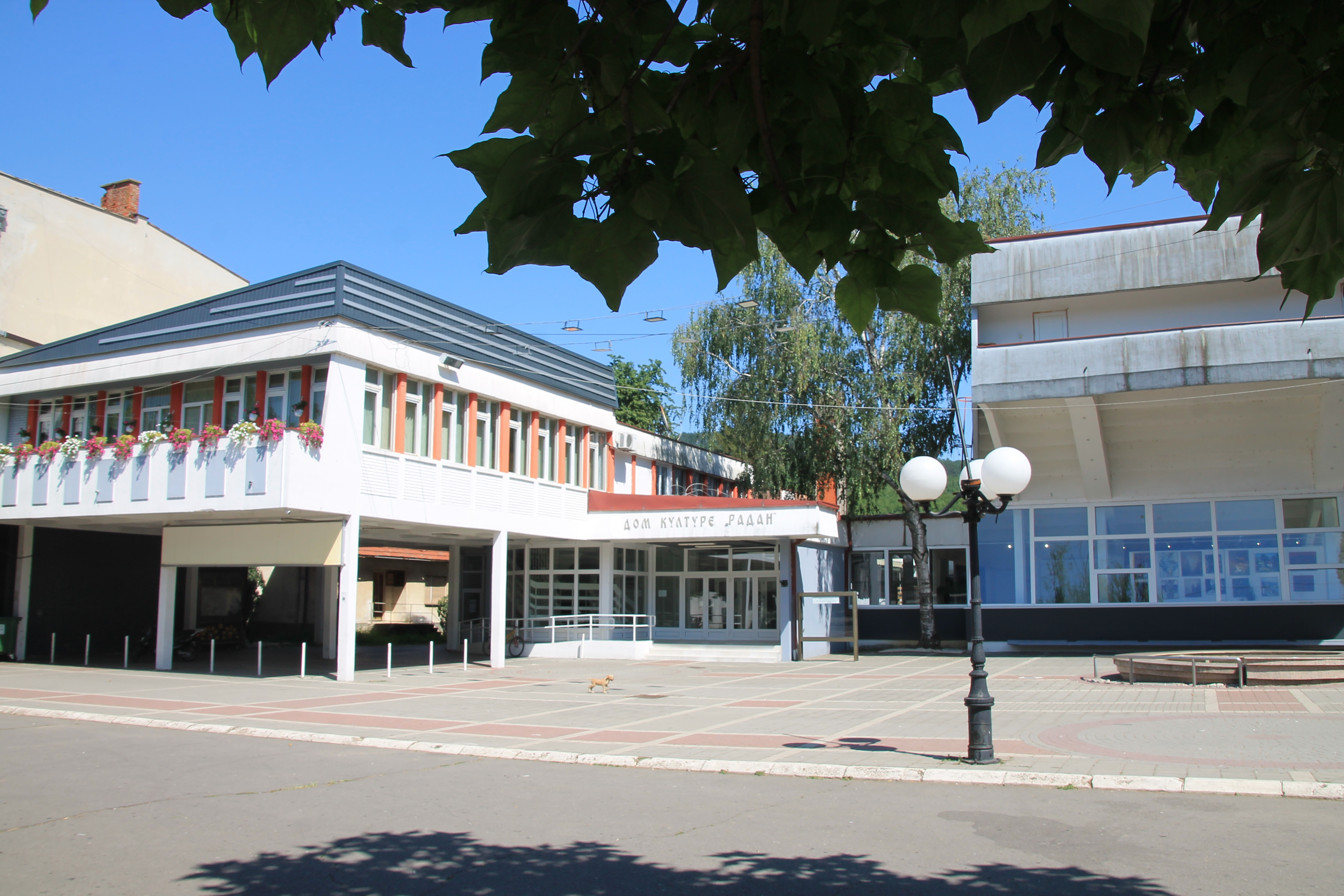
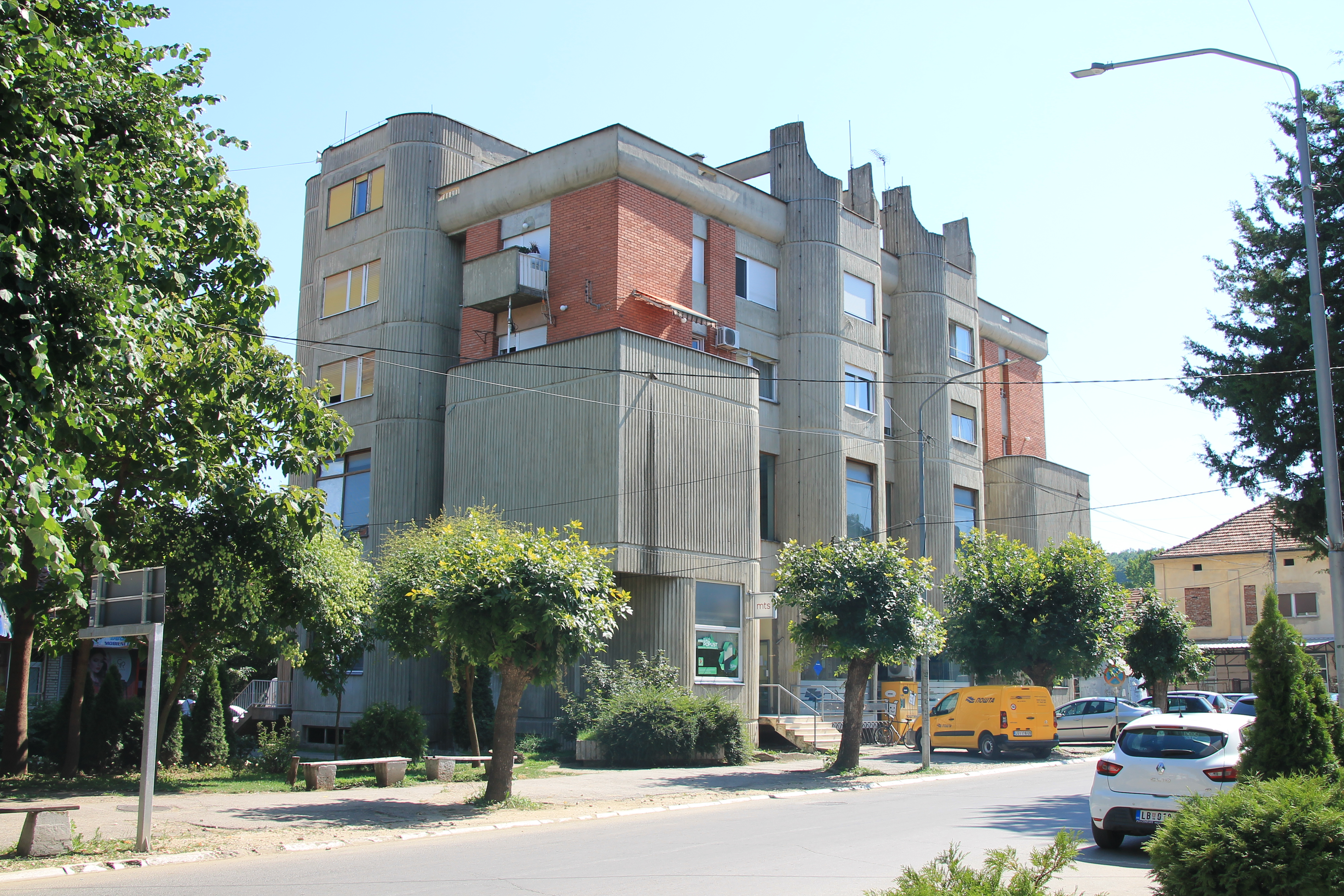

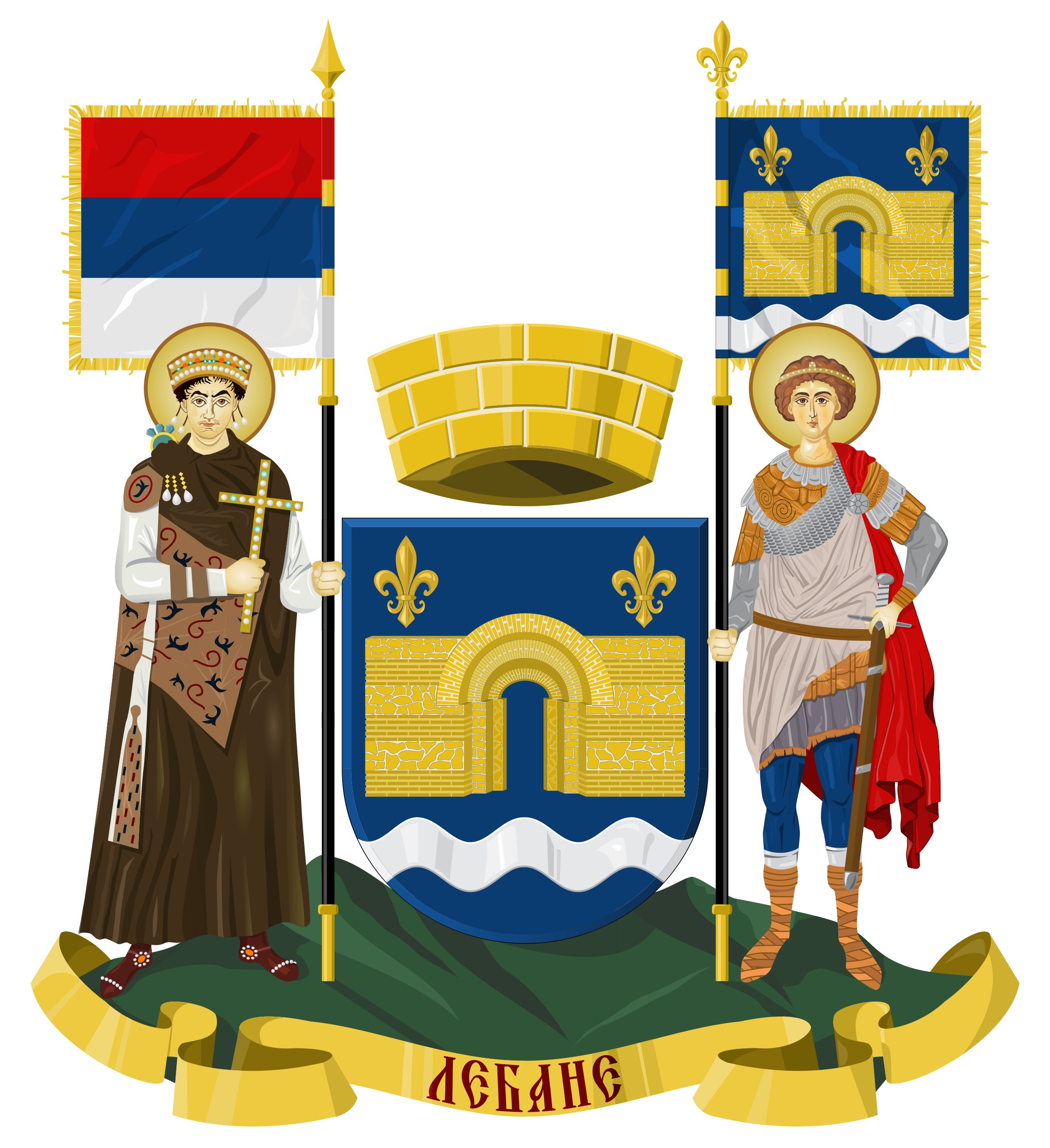
- Coat of arms

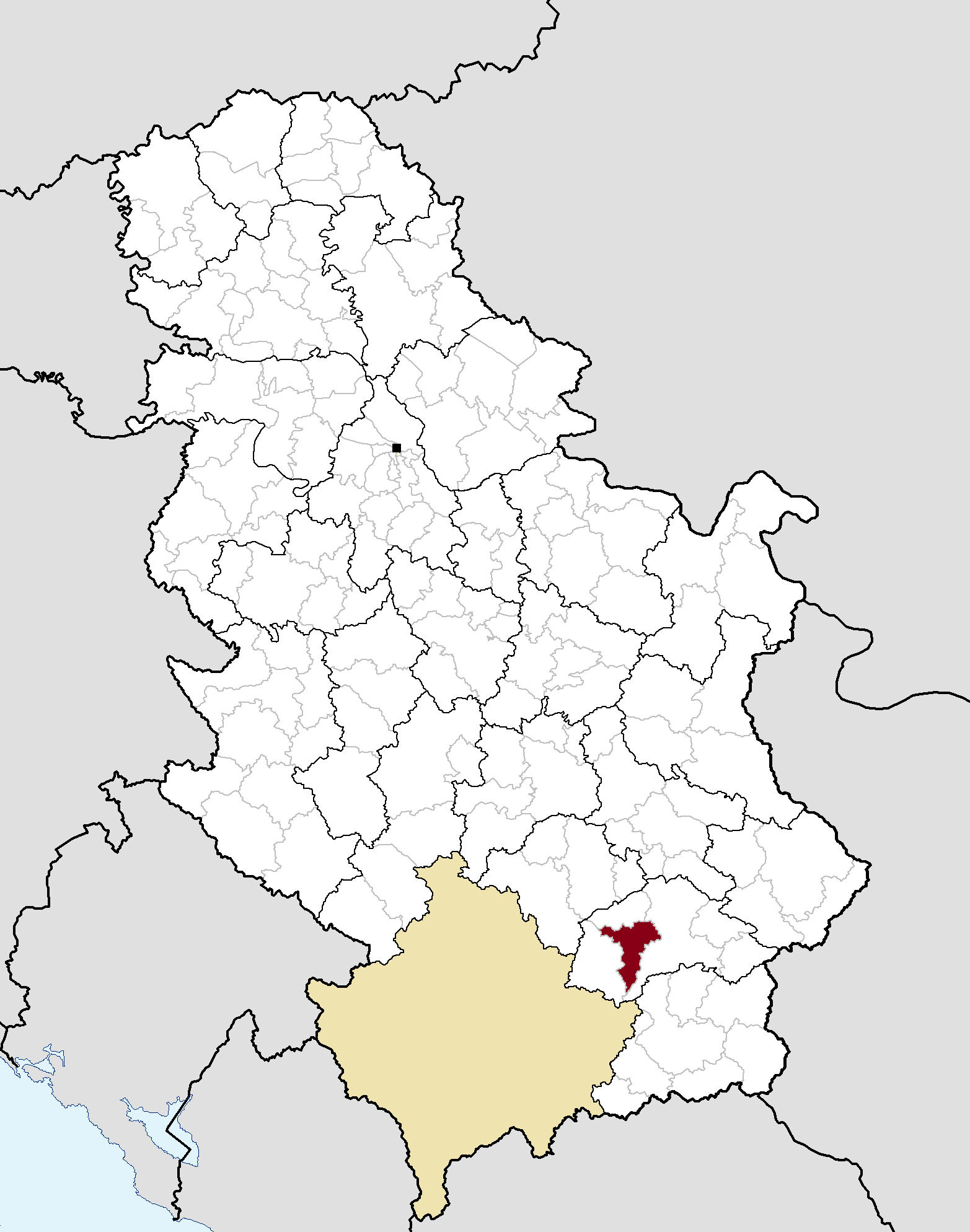
- Location of the municipality of Lebane within Serbia
- Coordinates: 42°55′N 21°44′E
- Country: Serbia
- Region: Southern and Eastern Serbia
- District: Jablanica
- Settlements: 39

Government
  - President: Ivan Bogdanović (SNS)

Area
  - Town: 9.40 km^{2} (3.63 sq mi)
  - Municipality: 337 km^{2} (130 sq mi)
- Elevation: 275 m (902 ft)

Population (2022 census)
  - Town: 8,025
  - Town density: 854/km^{2} (2,210/sq mi)
  - Municipality: 18,119
  - Municipality density: 53.8/km^{2} (139/sq mi)
- Time zone: UTC+1 (CET)
  - Summer (DST): UTC+2 (CEST)
- Postal code: 16230
- Area code: +381(0)16
- Car plates: LB
- Website: www.lebane.org.rs

Lebane (Serbian Cyrillic: Лебане) is a town and municipality located in the Jablanica District of southern Serbia. According to the 2022 census, the town has a population of 8,025 inhabitants, while the municipality has 18,119 inhabitants.

== Geography ==
The town is located at the confluence of the rivers Jablanica and Šumanska Reka, in the alluvial plain created by the former. Just northeast of the town a larger plain called Leskovačko polje extends toward the town of Leskovac, which is the district seat. The elevation of the town of Lebane is between 275.2 and 420 MASL.

== History ==
Back to Neolithic Age

Excavations in 2017–2019 revealed a stable settlement since about 6500 BC in Svinjarička Čuka in the village Štulac (Lebane). (See there.)

Prehistory and Medieval times

The favorable location and the richness of nature made Jablanica valley important place since the earliest times. Traffic affordable and fertile, Leskovac valley has provided favorable conditions for the settlement of population. Archaeological findings, of which the most important are Hissar and Caričin grad (Iustiniana Prima) show that life in this area, continuously evolved from prehistoric man to date.

First mention of Lebane as Hlebane dates back to 1512.

After the liberation from the Ottomans

Lebane is formed as a village of the same name after the liberation in 1878. Visiting Serbia in 1880s, M. Rakic writes about it as a "big village populated by Serbs, in a valley, on the river Jablanica, on its left bank." Only when Lebane got the role of Jablanica district headquarters, it began to gradually develop in a direction of a small town.

The core of this small town was a series of houses along the Jablanica which is 45m wide here (as is even now); at the end of this series are the buildings of the Court and Municipality. The main feature of this town were two huge cottonwood trees with a volume of not less than 10 m and three huge walnut tree on the right bank of the river, near the pedestrian bridge. One of these cottonwoods survived as one of the most recognizable Lebane's landmarks, in front of the Justiniana - Caričin Grad hotel, until 2008, when it was hit by a lightning and had to be removed.

Lebane has always been a Christian village with about forty houses scattered on the hill near the river. In 1900 it had 67 houses with 460 inhabitants.

World War 1 and interwar period

During WWI Lebane population suffered greatly from Bulgarian occupiers. Because of forcible mobilization of youth to the Bulgarian Army, people from Jablanica and Toplica rose to arms in Toplica Uprising and managed to liberate large part of Southern Serbia.

From 1929 to 1941, Lebane was part of the Vardar Banovina of the Kingdom of Yugoslavia. The emergence and development of the regional market in the period between the two world wars did not significantly encourage Lebane's development, so in the inter-war period it was still a rural town (eopolis) with about 1500 inhabitants. But its local importance was recognized by making it a center of Jablanica srez (corresponding to today's municipalities of Lebane, Medveđa and Bojnik).

Modern times

However, after WWII and, especially, during the "Golden 70's", thanks to the numerous industrial plants built within the town, Lebane grew substantially and its population increased more than fivefold. The fastest pace of growth was in the period from 1977 to 1985, thanks to an unfortunate event – in 1976 Lebane was hit by a catastrophic flood. Then unregulated river Jablanica, swollen after a long rainy period, broke on 6 June, burst its banks and caused enormous material damage in Lebane. Flood toll was paid and human victims (killed two people).

After this tragic event, with financial help, Lebane begins to industrialize faster, and the process of industrialization has caused more versatile and faster development of the city.

== Demographics ==
Historical population
Year	Pop.	±% p.a.
1948	26,290	—
1953	28,062	+1.31%
1961	27,579	−0.22%
1971	28,228	+0.23%
1981	27,836	−0.14%
1991	27,068	−0.28%
2002	24,918	−0.75%
2011	22,000	−1.37%
2022	18,119	−1.75%

According to the 2011 census, the municipality has 22,000 inhabitants.

=== Ethnic groups ===
The ethnic composition of the municipality:

Ethnic group	Population	%
Serbs	20,398	92.72%
Romani	1,251	5.69%
Montenegrins	20	0.09%
Macedonians	16	0.07%
Gorani	7	0.03%
Yugoslavs	4	0.02%
Others	304	1.38%
Total	22,000	

== Economy ==
The following table gives a preview of total number of registered people employed in legal entities per their core activity (as of 2018):

Activity	Total
Agriculture, forestry and fishing	49
Mining and quarrying	-
Manufacturing	634
Electricity, gas, steam and air conditioning supply	24
Water supply; sewerage, waste management and remediation activities	36
Construction	98
Wholesale and retail trade, repair of motor vehicles and motorcycles	415
Transportation and storage	115
Accommodation and food services	92
Information and communication	9
Financial and insurance activities	12
Real estate activities	1
Professional, scientific and technical activities	100
Administrative and support service activities	36
Public administration and defense; compulsory social security	272
Education	359
Human health and social work activities	224
Arts, entertainment and recreation	40
Other service activities	57
Individual agricultural workers	376
Total	2,951

== Features ==
The most significant historical monument in the vicinity of the town and within the boundaries of the municipality is the 6th century AD late Roman or early Byzantine town Justiniana Prima, locally better known as Caričin Grad, located c. 7 km from Lebane. The town is built by the Eastern Roman Emperor Justinian I to reputedly mark the location of his birth. The archaeological excavations on this site have been on-going since 1917 and large parts of the ancient settlement have since been uncovered including the impressive fortifications.

In the municipality of Lebane there is ongoing discussion for the new Lebane coat of arms.

== Gallery ==
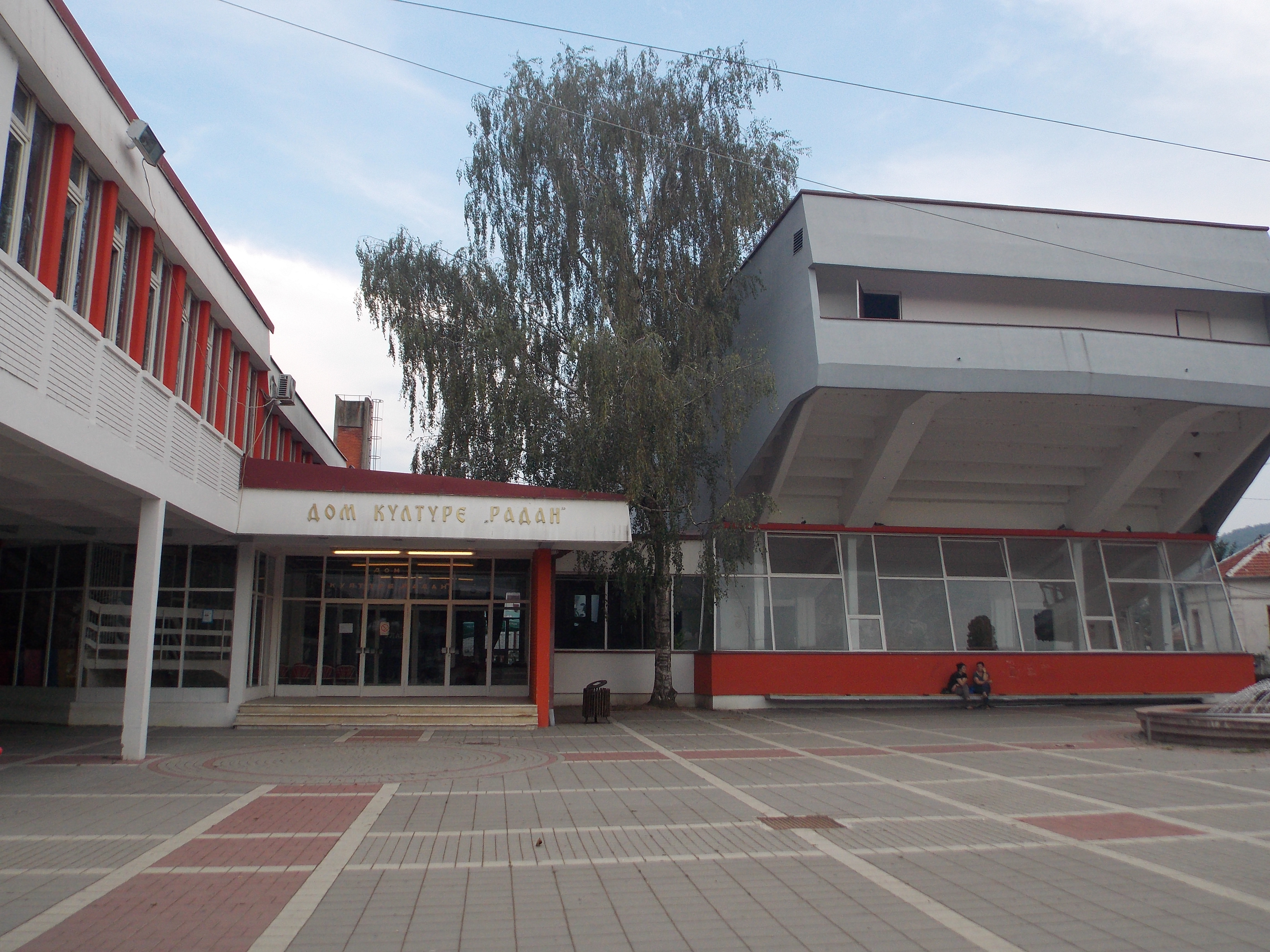
Cultural Center Radan

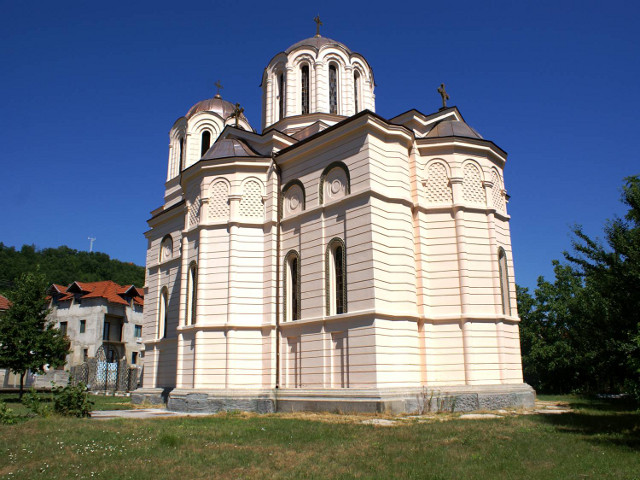
Orthodox Church in Lebane

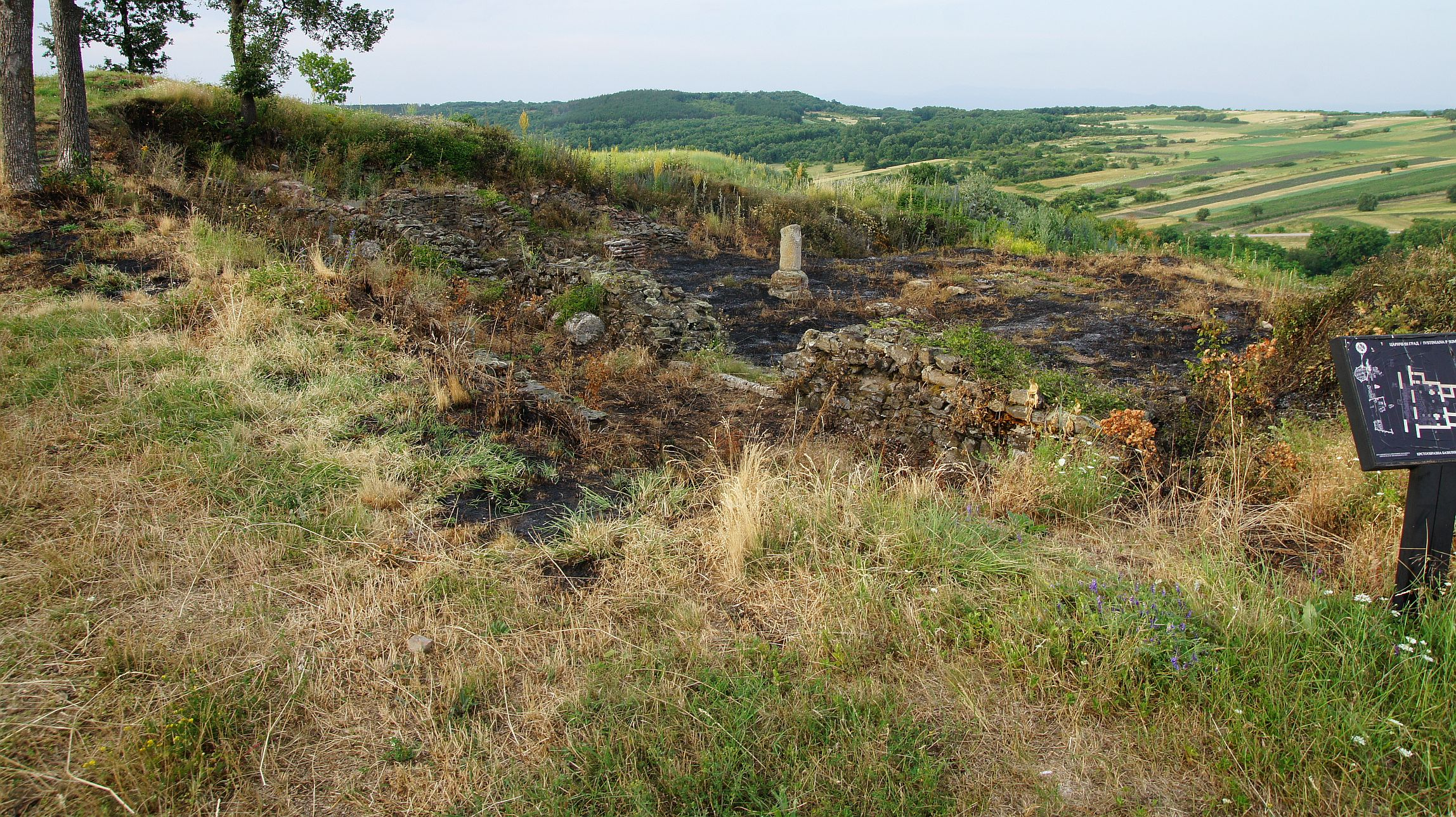
Ruins of Justiniana Prima

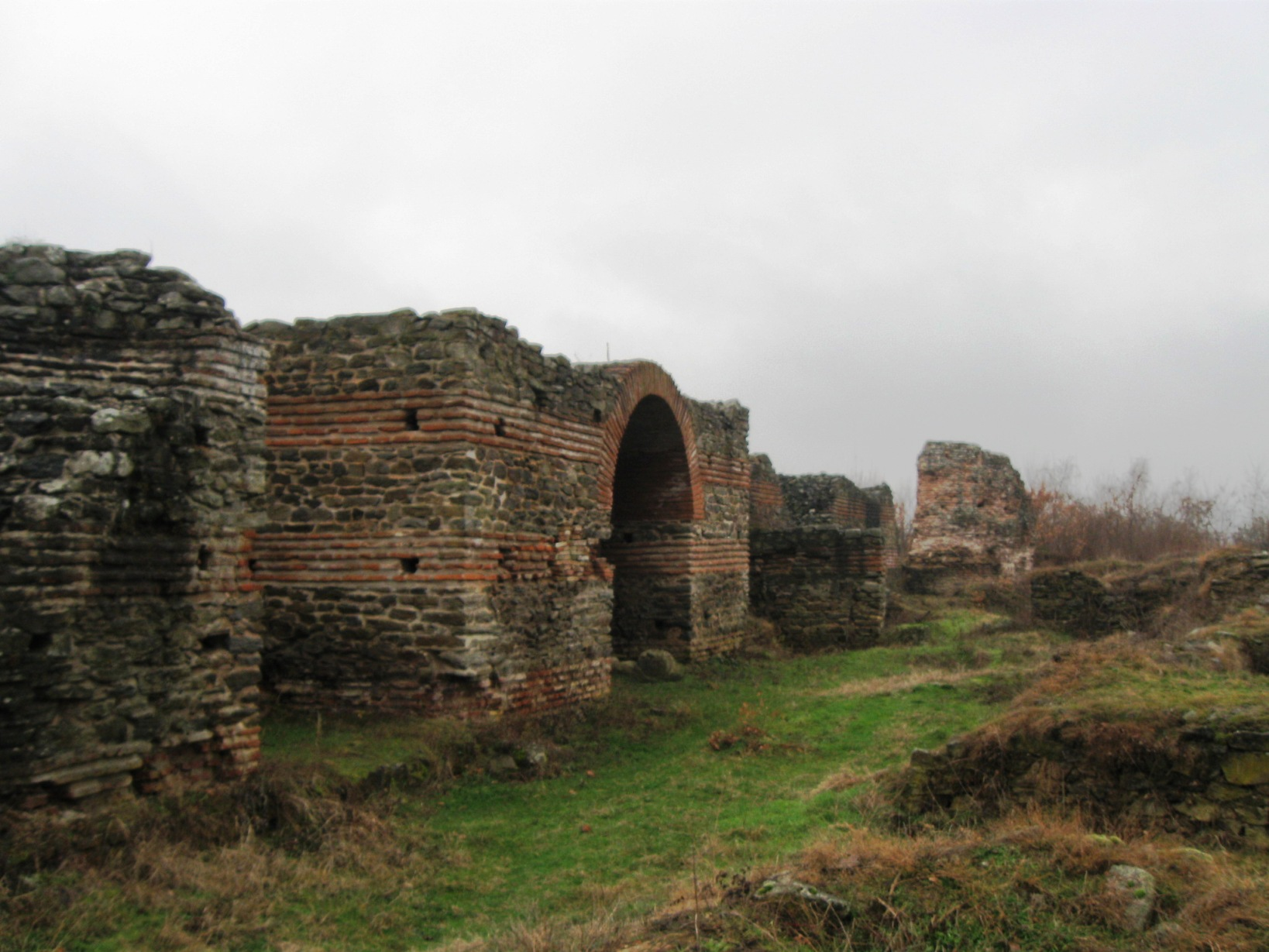
Imperial Town - Ruins of Justiniana Prima

== See also ==
- List of populated places in Serbia
