= Jablanica District =

Administrative district of Serbia

Jablanica District Јабланички округ
- Administrative district of Serbia
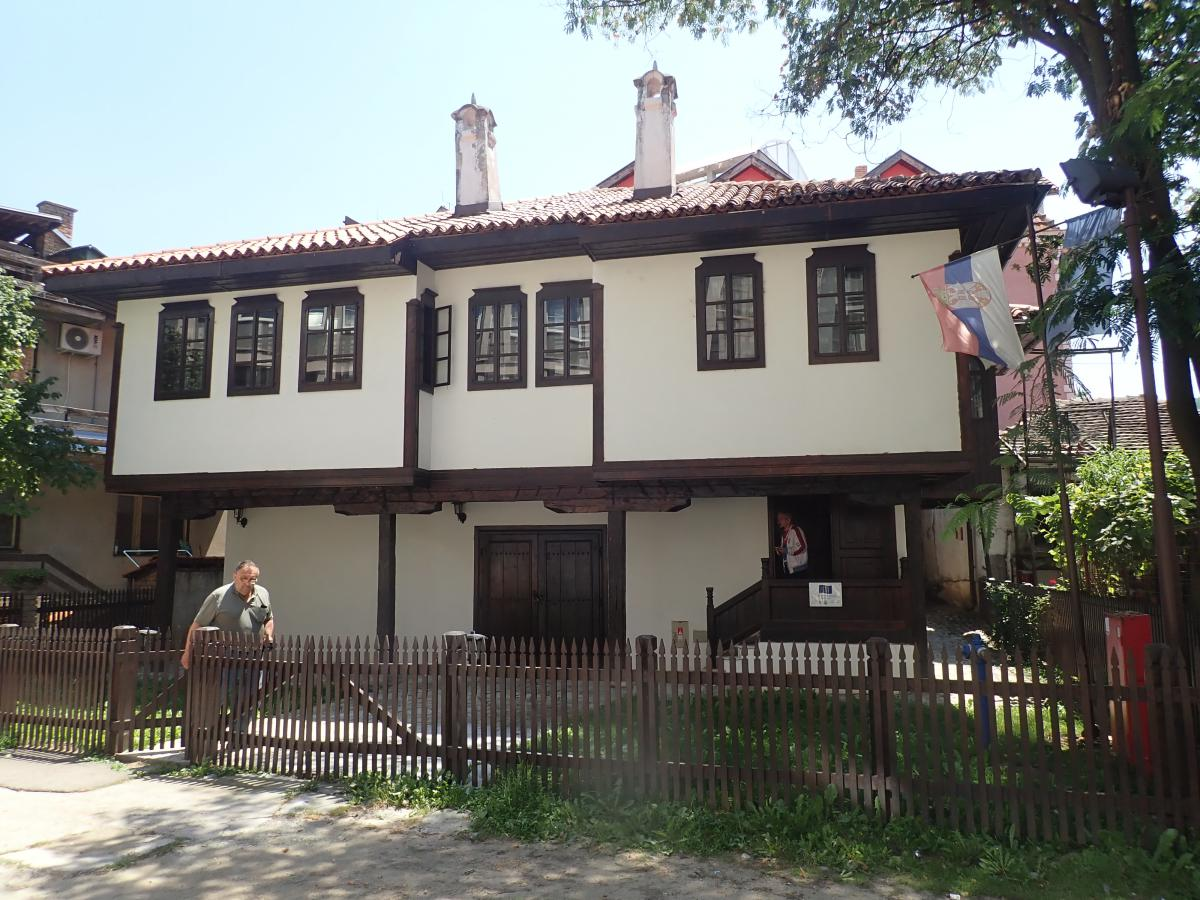
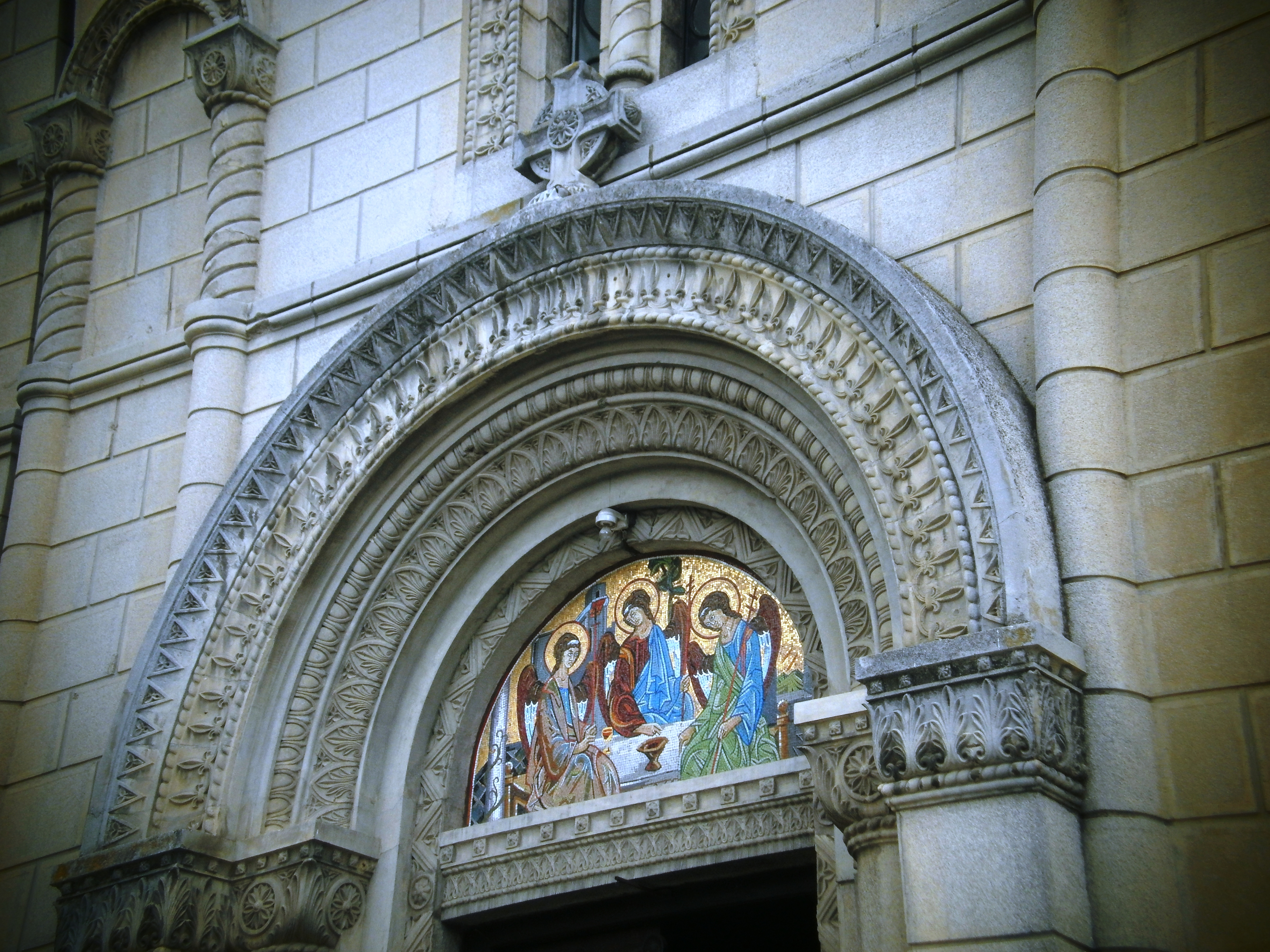
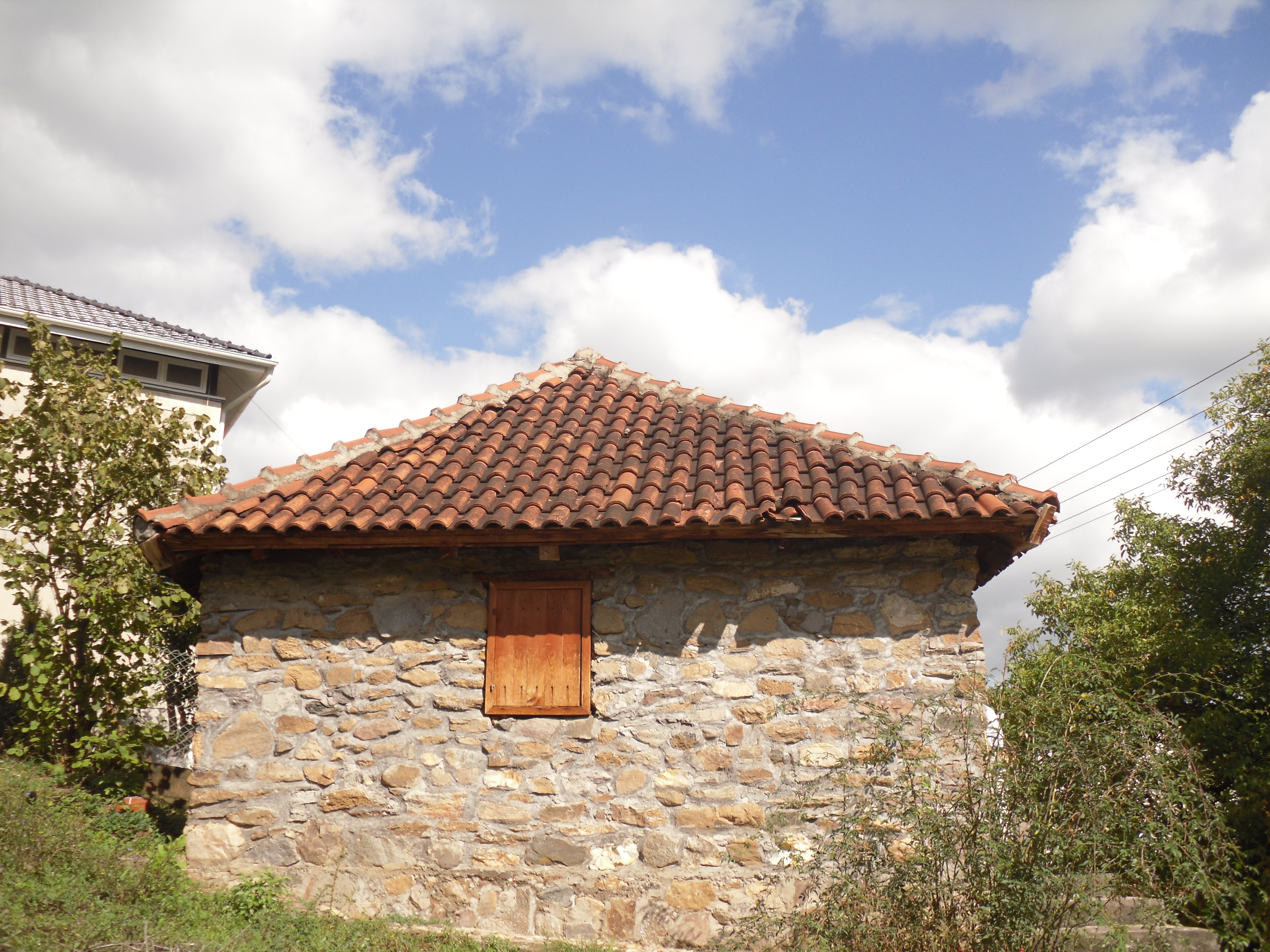
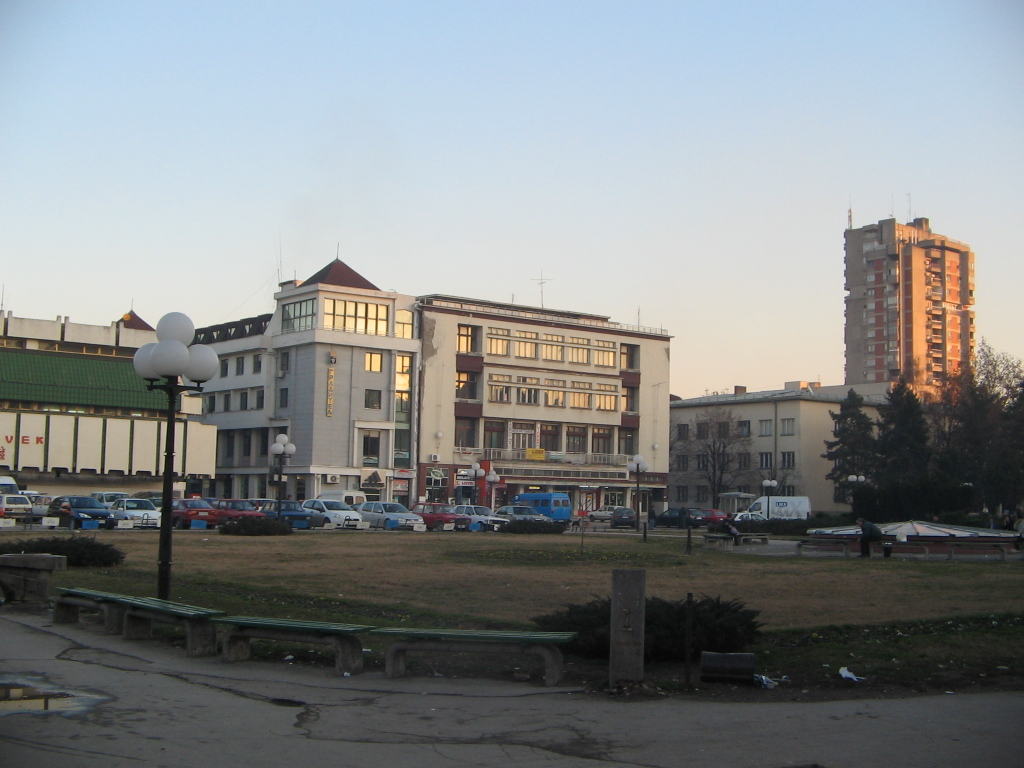
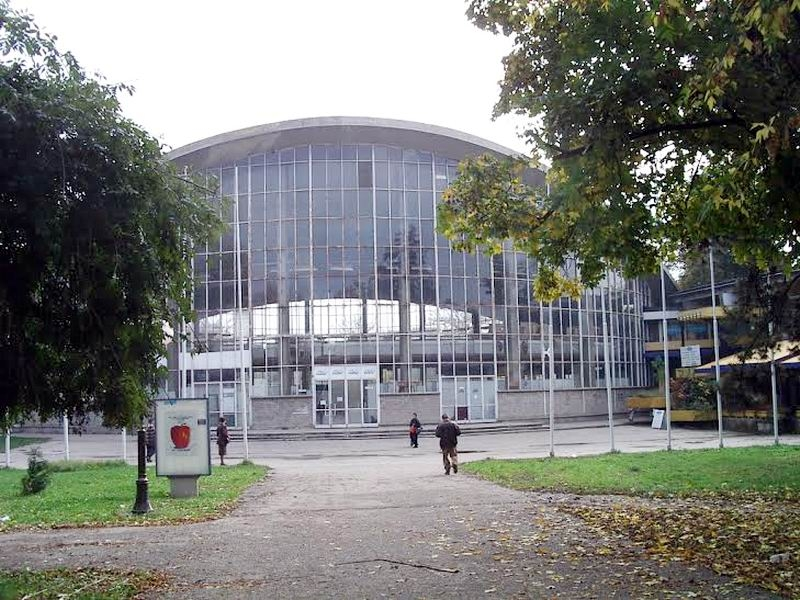
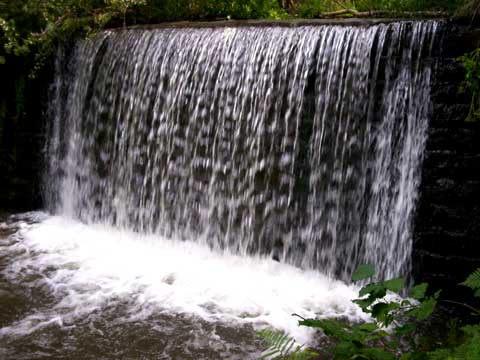
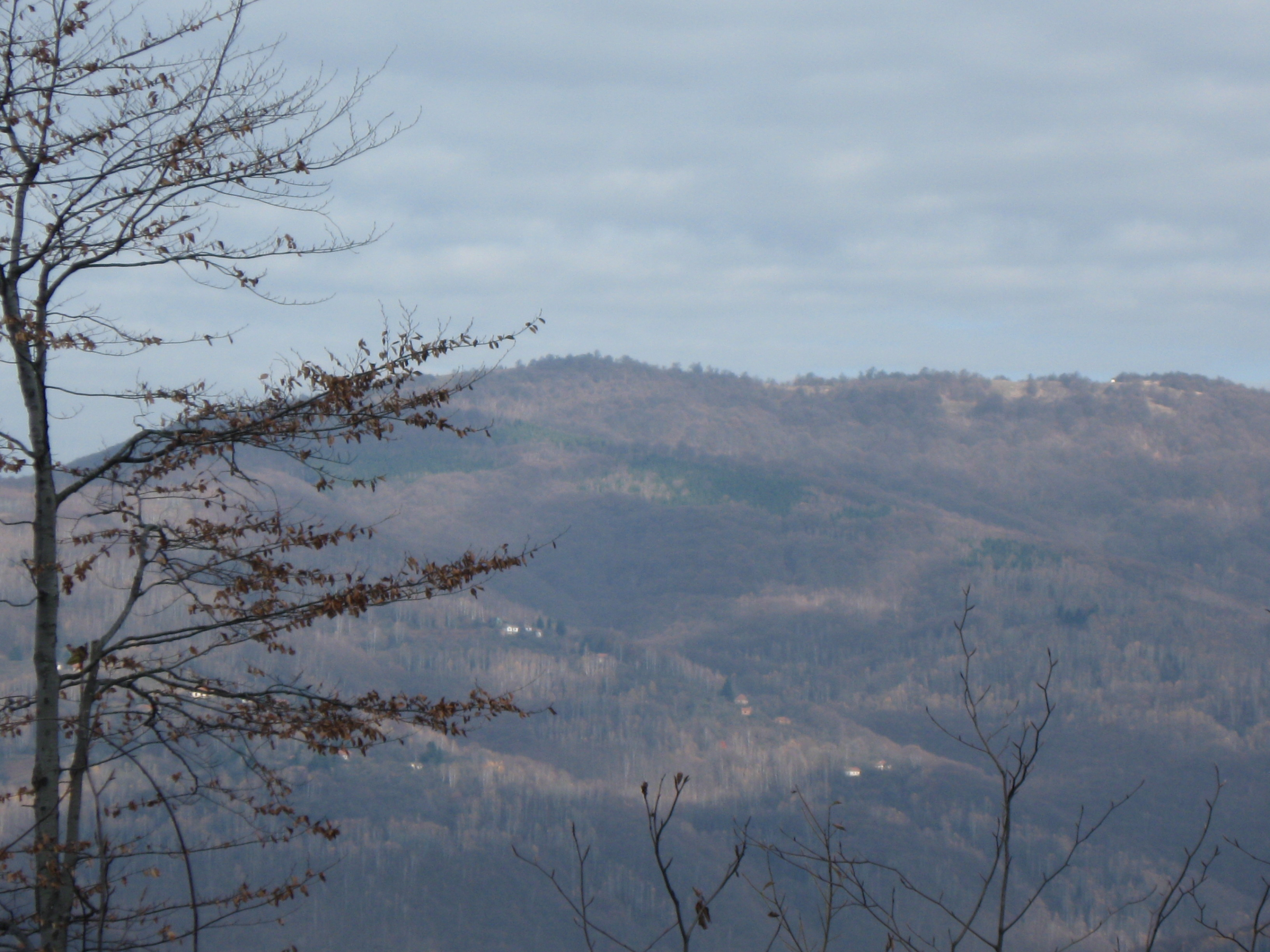
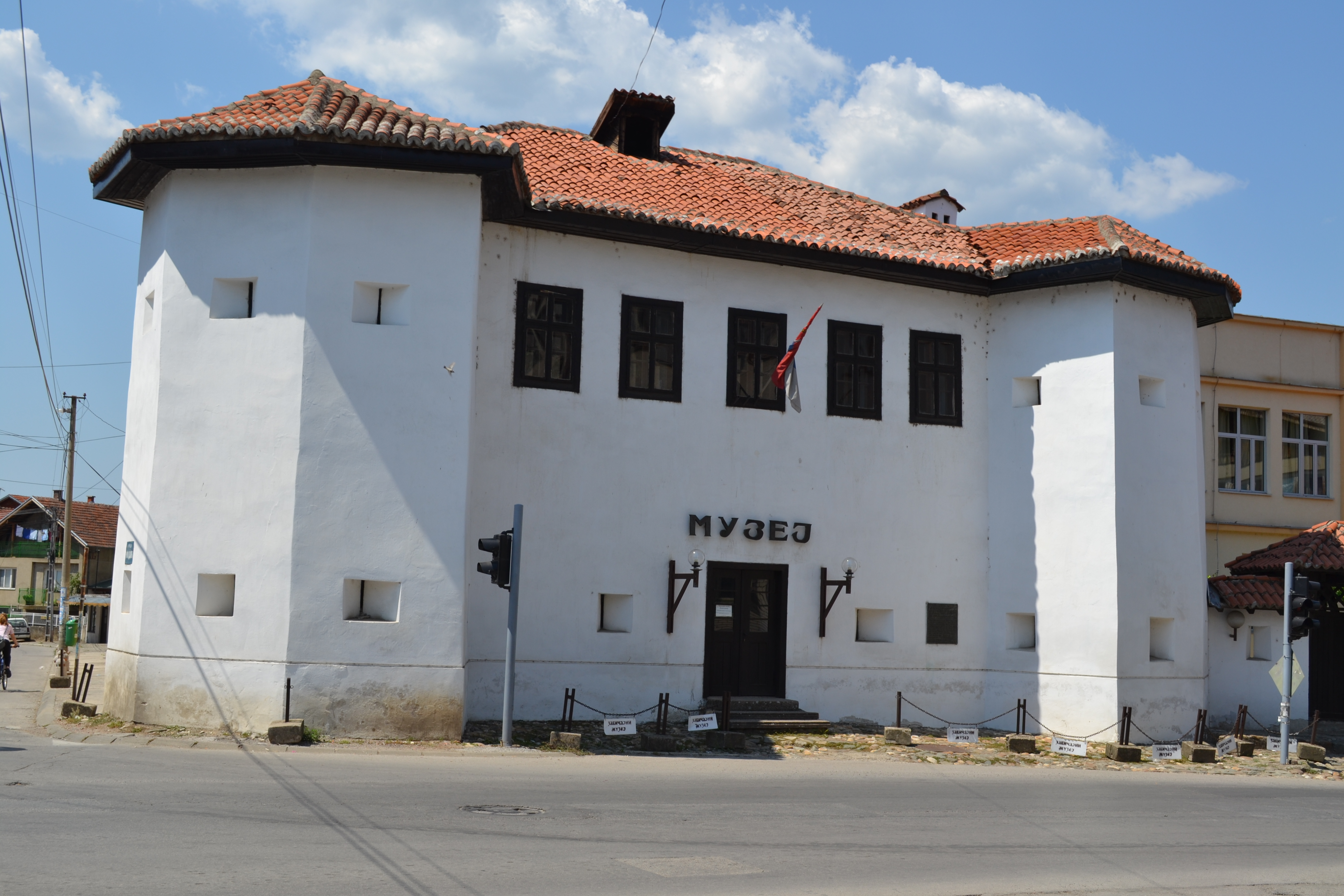
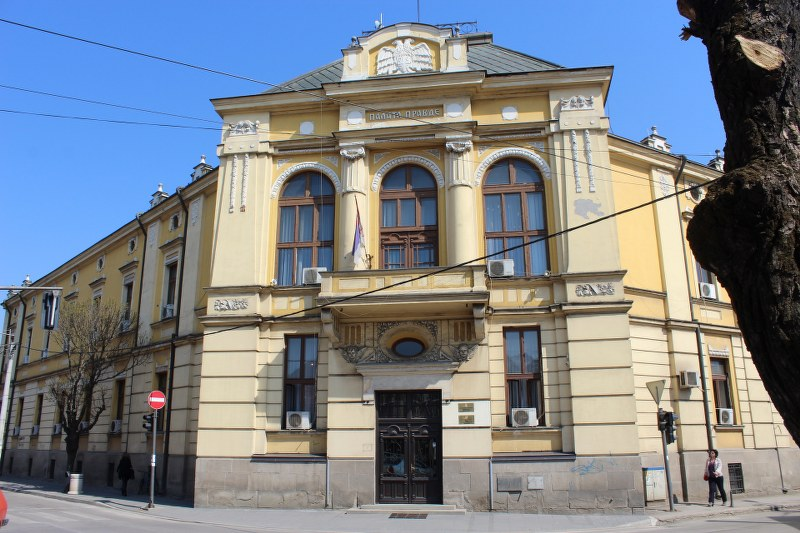
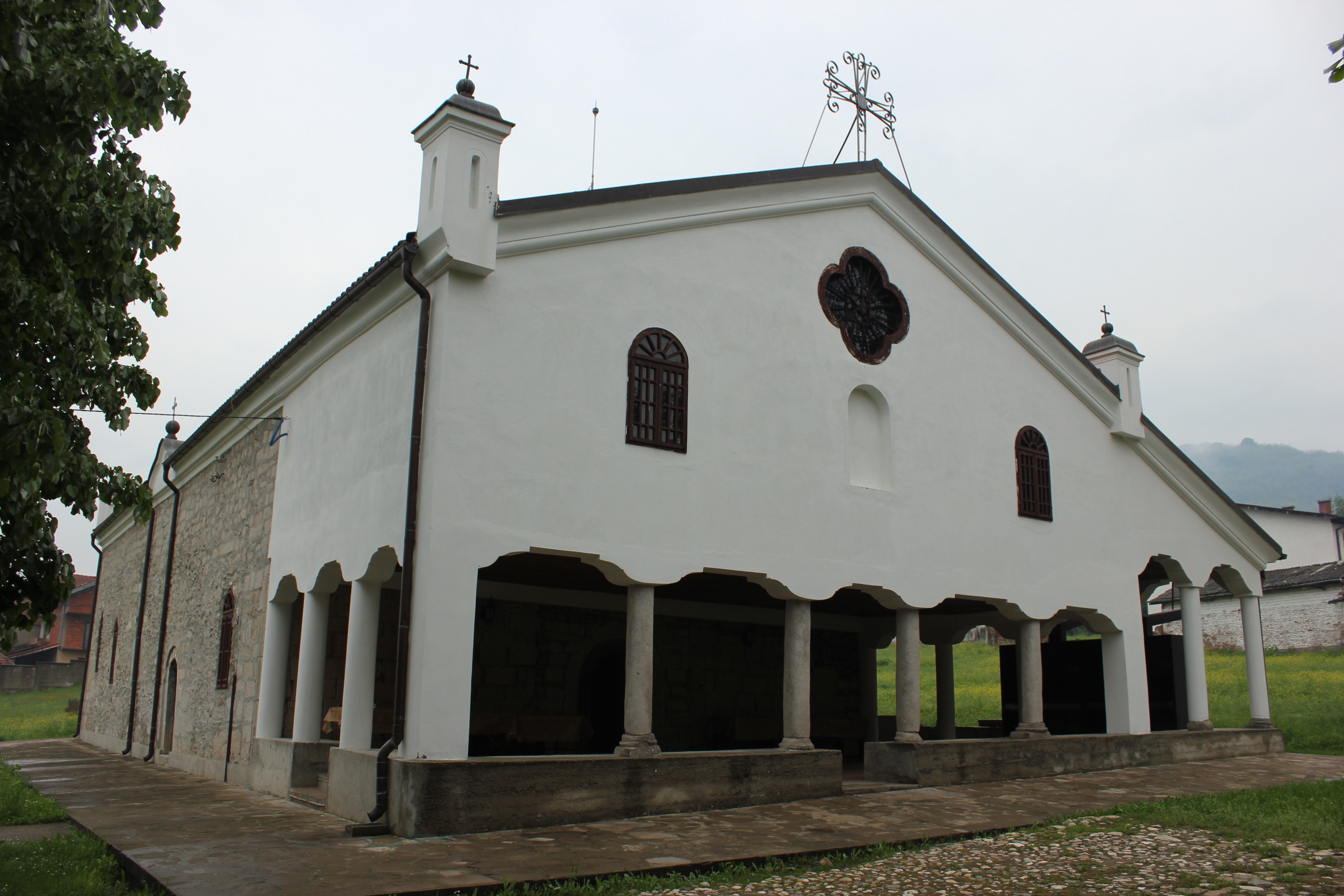
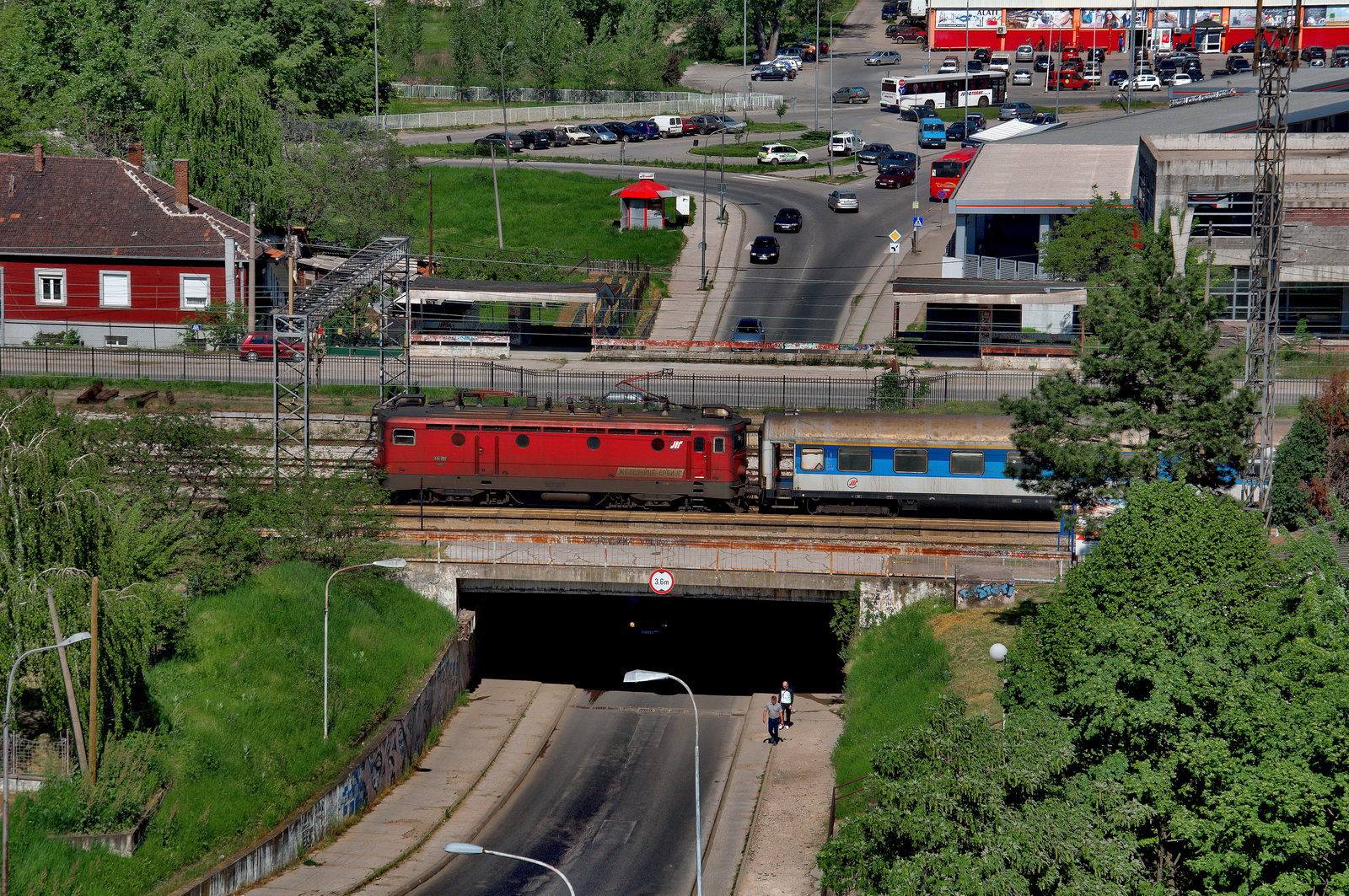
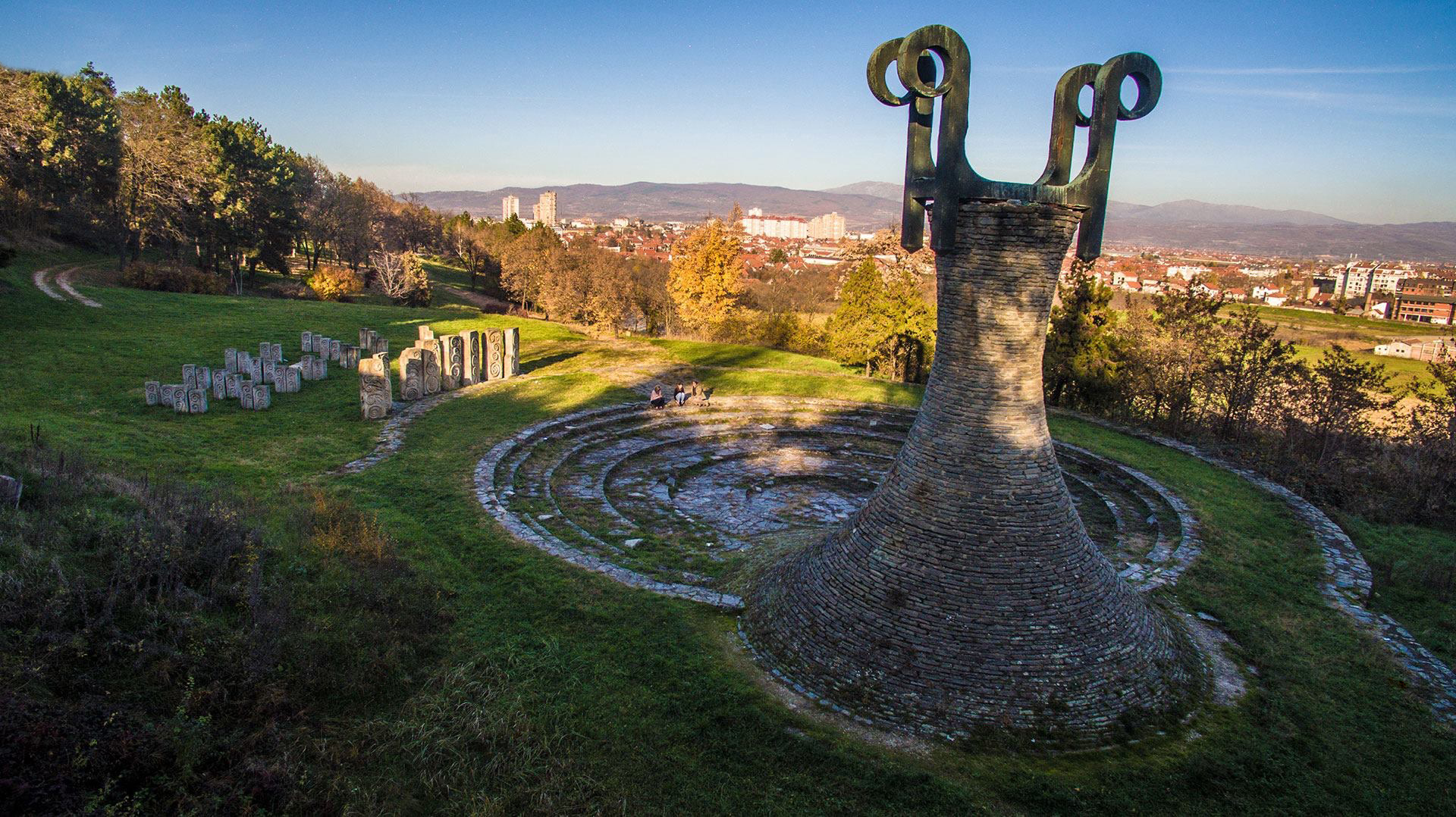
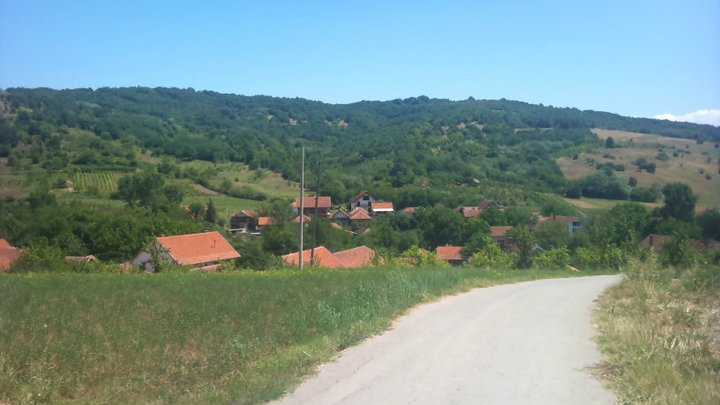
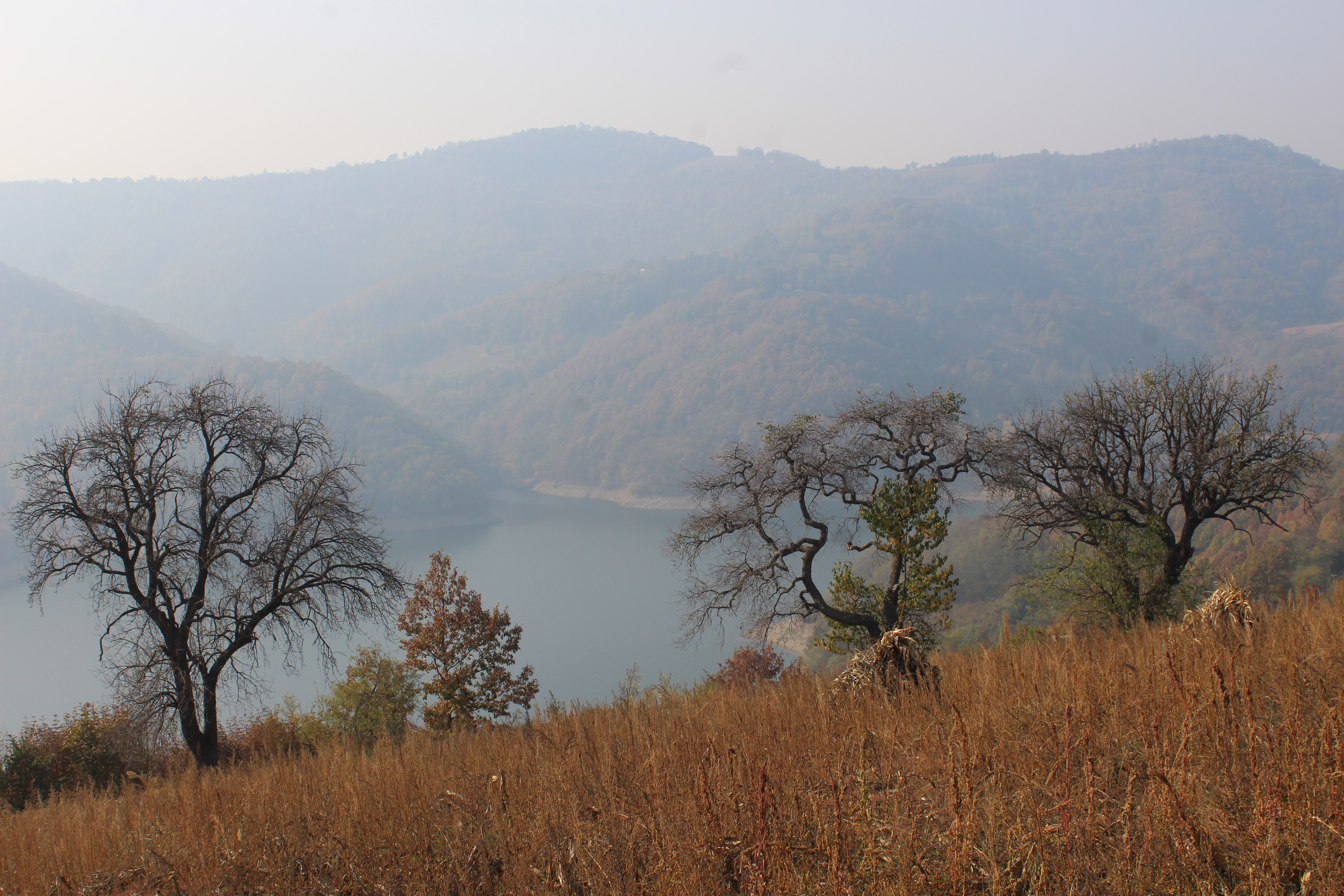
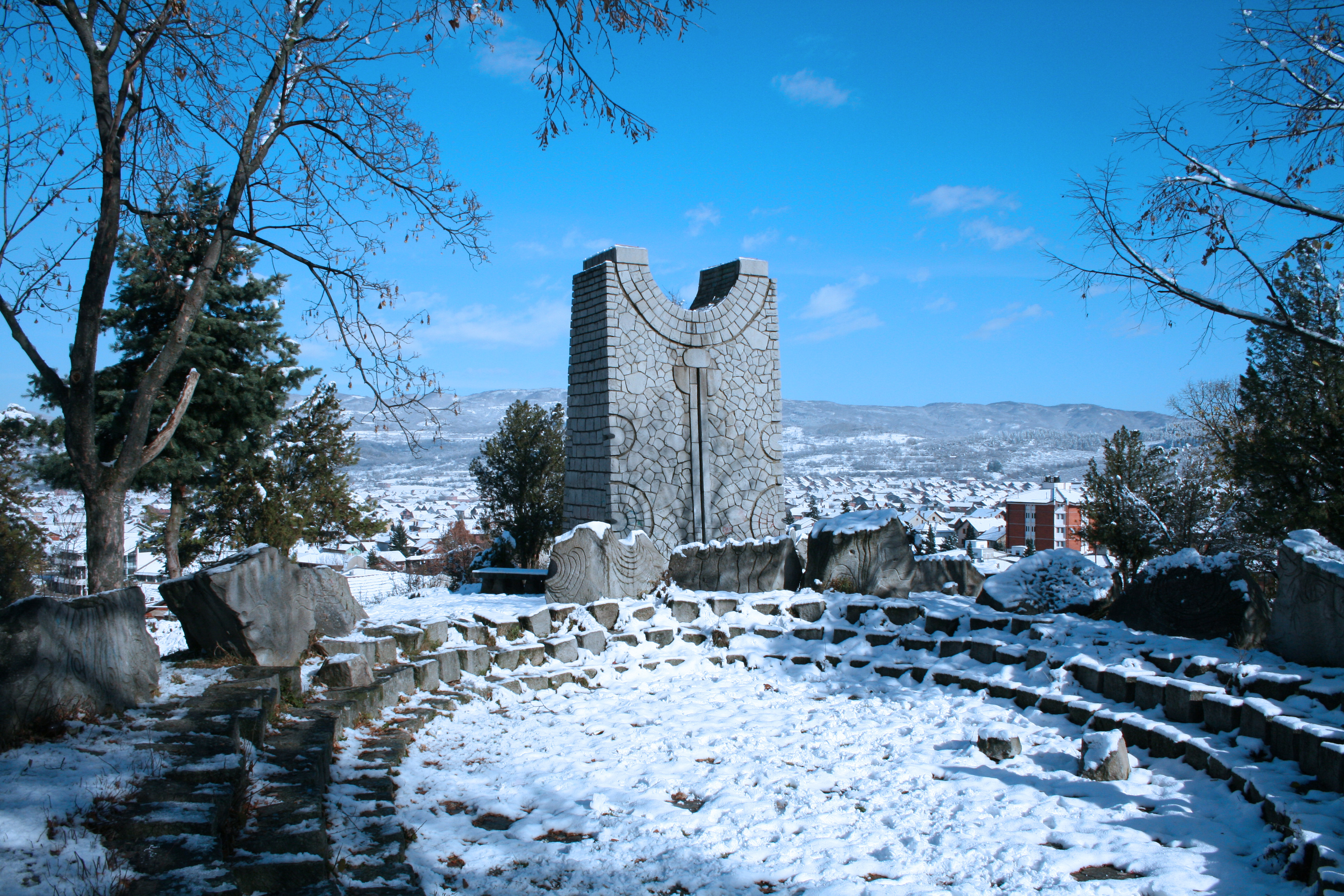
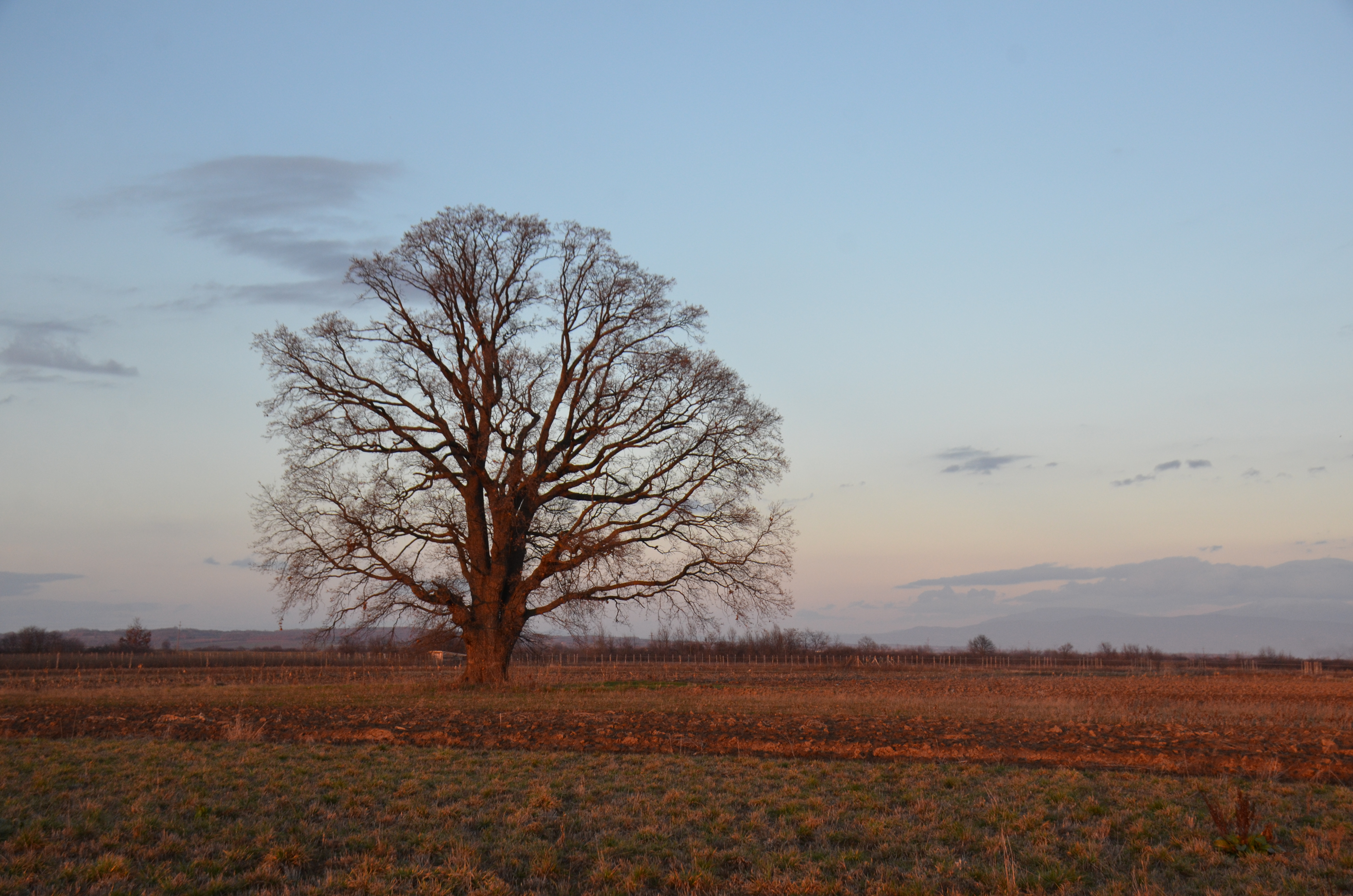
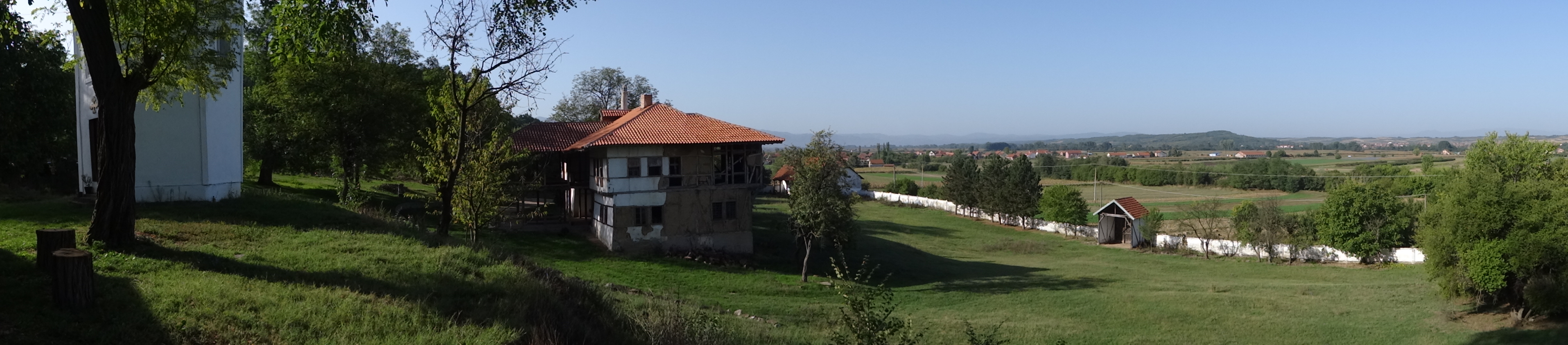
- Images from the Jablanica District

- Location of district in Serbia
- Coordinates: 43°00′N 21°57′E
- Country: Serbia
- Administrative center: Leskovac

Government
  - Commissioner: Miloš Ćirić

Area
  - Total: 2,769 km^{2} (1,069 sq mi)

Population (2022)
  - Total: 184,502
  - Density: 66.63/km^{2} (172.6/sq mi)
- ISO 3166 code: RS-23
- Municipalities: 5 and 1 city
- Settlements: 336
  - Cities and towns: 7
  - Villages: 329
- Website: jablanicki.okrug.gov.rs

The Jablanica District (Serbian: Јабланички округ, romanized: Jablanički okrug, pronounced [jâblaːnitʃkiː ôkruːɡ]) is one of administrative districts of Serbia. It lies in the southeastern parts of the country. According to the 2022 census, the district has a population of 184,502 inhabitants. The administrative center of the district is the city of Leskovac.

== History ==
The present-day administrative districts (including Jablanica District) were established in 1992 by the decree of the Government of Serbia.

== Cities and municipalities ==
The Jablanica District encompasses the territories of one city and five municipalities:

- Leskovac (city)
- Bojnik (municipality)
- Crna Trava (municipality)
- Lebane (municipality)
- Medveđa (municipality)
- Vlasotince (municipality)

== Demographics ==
Historical population
Year	Pop.	±%
1948	231,280	—
1953	244,128	+5.6%
1961	254,855	+4.4%
1971	260,982	+2.4%
1981	262,531	+0.6%
1991	255,011	−2.9%
2002	240,923	−5.5%
2011	216,304	−10.2%
2022	184,502	−14.7%

=== Towns ===
There are two towns with over 10,000 inhabitants.

- Leskovac: 58,338
- Vlasotince: 14,924

=== Ethnic structure ===
Ethnicity	Population	Share
Serbs	164,382	89.1%
Roma	10,542	5.7%
Others	2,002	1%
Undeclared/Unknown	7,576	4.1%

== See also ==
- Administrative districts of Serbia
- Administrative divisions of Serbia
