= Chetniks in World War I =

Serbian irregular units during World War I

Chetniks (World War I)
- Active: August 1914 – November 1918
- Disbanded: November 1918
- Country: Kingdom of Serbia
- Branch: Royal Serbian Army
- Type: Irregular infantry
- Role: Guerrilla warfare, reconnaissance, sabotage
- Size: 2,250 (August 1914)
- Part of: In 1914: Third Army, Užice Army
- Engagements: First World War; Serbian campaign; Battle of Cer; Toplica uprising

Chetniks in World War I were irregular auxiliary units of the Royal Serbian Army, active between 1914 and 1918, and tasked with special operations against invading Austro-Hungarian, Bulgarian, and German forces. Although their origins lay in earlier nationalist resistance movements and their formal use during the Balkan Wars (1912–1913), the Serbian Army established four official Chetnik detachments in August 1914.

Initially deployed to defend Serbia's borders, these units soon shifted to guerrilla operations behind enemy lines, engaging in sabotage, ambushes, and diversionary attacks. Following the occupation of Serbia in late 1915, surviving Chetniks reorganised into underground resistance groups, forming new detachments that continued to operate in the occupied territories. They played a significant role in the Toplica uprising (1917) and contributed to the final liberation of Serbia and Montenegro in 1918.

After the war, most Chetnik detachments were demobilised or absorbed into the Royal Yugoslav Army. Some former commanders remained active in nationalist veterans' organisations. The memory and legacy of the First World War Chetniks were later revived, by the Yugoslav Army in the Homeland, the royalist resistance movement, during the Second World War.

== Origin ==
The Chetnik units of the Royal Serbian Army trace their origins to the era of the late Ottoman Empire, when groups of Serbian outlaws were organised to resist Ottoman-Turkish rule and later to oppose rival pro-Bulgarian factions (Bulgarian comitadjis) in Macedonia, as well as Austrian occupation in Bosnia-Herzegovina. The term "Chetnik" (Četnik) derives from the Serbian word četa, meaning band or troop. It was first defined by scholar Vuk Karadžić in his Serbian language dictionary in 1818.

In 1902, in response to guerrilla activity in Macedonia, Serbia established its own armed organisation in the region: the Chetnik Committee for Military Action. Its members became known as Četniks, or Komitadji, like their rival Bulgarian counterparts, from the word “committee”. During the Balkan Wars (1912–1913), Chetnik units played key roles, acting as vanguards, disrupting enemy lines, attacking communications, and imposing order in liberated areas. They operated under army command and remained active during the Second Balkan War against Bulgaria, gaining extensive guerrilla experience. After the war, they took part in pacification efforts in newly acquired or contested territories, at times resorting to terror tactics and violence against civilians, particularly following the Albanian uprising in western Macedonia.

== Formation ==
On 28 July 1914, a Special Command for volunteer units was established by the Serbian War Ministry. On 4 August, the Serbian Army's Supreme Command, following a directive from the government, created four Chetnik detachments totalling 2,250 men. Each detachment, placed under the command of Serbian officers, (Note: The detachments were all commanded by leading Black Hand figures.) consisted of one to three battalions. While predominantly Serb, Chetnik units also included other South Slavs of various confessions. The Serbian Army was among the first in Europe to incorporate such guerrilla detachments into its ranks.

The Serbian government and High Command issued a general ruling regarding Chetniks' activity, based on Chief of the General Staff Radomir Putnik’s 1911 Manual War Service. In the event of a Serbian offensive, they were to "disrupt the enemy rear, attack transport lines, and compel the enemy to disperse its forces". In the event of an Austro-Hungarian offensive, they were to incite rebellion in Habsburg's territory inhabited by Serbs, and if the enemy manage to penetrate deep in Serbia "attack the enemy rear with the greatest force", to spread fear and panic. Chetnik units were to remain in permanent contact with their army group commanders, to avoid previous experiences of disobedience and lack of coordination. The main force of the Serbian army was to be kept inland, leaving regionally based second and third levy units, (Note: The Serbian Army's second levy were men aged 32–37 while third levy were men aged 38–45.) supported by Chetnik detachments, to defend the borders and conduct reconnaissance. Once the direction of the main enemy advance was known, the main Serbian army was to concentrate its force and engage the enemy.

Chetnik detachments in August 1914
Detachment designation	Commander	Size	Location	Part of
Jadar Chetnik Detachment	Major Vojin Popovic Vuk	500 men	Mačva region	Third Army
Rudnik Chetnik Detachment	Major Vojislav Tankosić	500 men	Belgrade and Mt. Rudnik	Third Army
Gornjacki Chetnik Detachment	Major Velimir Vemić	500 men	Eastern Serbia	Užice Army
Zlatibor Chetnik Detachment	Major Kosta Todorović	750 men	Western Serbia Zlatibor and Mt. Jelova	Užice Army

== Operational history ==
=== Austro-Hungarian invasions (1914) ===
The first Chetnik units to see action were those assigned to the defence of Belgrade on the night of 28 July 1914. During the bombardment of Belgrade, to stop Habsburg forces from crossing a railway bridge over the Sava, the Tankosić detachment dynamited it. Dušan Ðonović, a member of Jovan Babunski’s Chetnik group was one of the first casualties.

The Austro-Hungarians undertook three invasions of Serbia during the autumn of 1914. Upon crossing the Drina River from Bosnia, on the first day of the offensive, on 12 August 1914, the Austro-Hungarian Balkanstreitkräfte faced immediate opposition from Chetnik detachments and border defence troops. 500 Chetnik of the Lešnica Detachment took up defensive positions on the heights east of the river. On the first day of the offensive, Chetniks units were responsible for casualties on Austro-Hungarian first-levy troops. On 15 August, as the Fifth Army moved up the Jadar valley where it mostly encountered Chetnik resistance; the Rudnik Detachment managed to stop the Austro Hungarian 42nd Home Guard Infantry Division near Krupanj. On the 19 August Chetnik units participated in the Third Army's effort to hold Habsburg forces near Mount Cer. By 20 August, defeat at the Battle of Cer forced the Austro-Hungarians back into their territory.

On 14 September the Užice Army crossed the Drina into Bosnia with its Chetnik units, but made little headway. On 27 September 1914, Major Todorović, commander of the Zlatibor Chetnik detachment, was killed near Srebrenica, after being captured. The third Austro-Hungarian offensive took place in November and December 1914. Potiorek launched an attack from Bosnia into northwestern Serbia on 17 November, capturing Belgrade on 2 December. Putnik launched a counterattack on 3 December, forcing the Habsburg forces to retreat by 9 December. Belgrade was evacuated by the Austro-Hungarians six days later, on 15 December 1914.

=== Second Serbian campaign (1915) ===
In October 1915, the Kingdom of Serbia faced a combined invasion from Austro-Hungarian, German, and Bulgarian forces advancing from two directions. The invading armies included the Austro-Hungarian Third Army, German Eleventh Army, and Bulgarian First and Second armies, took six weeks to invade the country. Among the Chetnik formations involved in the defence was the Vardar Detachment, commanded by Jovan Babunski. Formed in early 1915 as a tactical-operational unit of the Serbian Army's Vardar Division, it was allowed to operate independently. Initially composed of 1,640 men, mostly Macedonian soldiers led by Serbian officers and NCOs, it later expanded to nearly 6,000. Stationed in Macedonia, in the Kratovo, Ovče Pole, and Kočani regions, the detachment was tasked with securing the eastern border against Bulgarian incursions and frequently clashed with IMRO bands. In the autumn of 1915, Babunski's forces were deployed to Kačanik, where they helped halt a Bulgarian division for nearly a month despite heavy losses. In addition to Babunski's detachment, Chetnik units active in 1915 included the Srem Volunteer Detachment, led by former Austro-Hungarian officer Ignjat Kirhner; the Bantaš Detachment; the Volunteer Detachment of Vojin Popovic "Vuk", which numbered approximately 3,000 men; and the Second Volunteer Battalion under the command of Major Vojislav Tankosić.

Outnumbered and facing formidable opposition, the Serbian Army retreated southward towards Albania, together with the Serbian government and thousands of civilians, aiming to reach the Adriatic coast for evacuation and regrouping. Surviving Chetnik detachments, including Babunski's, withdrew with the Serbian army via Albania to Corfu and later were transferred to the Salonika front. Surviving members were regrouped into a Volunteer Detachment and deployed in conventional combat. The unit saw action at the Battle of Kaymakchalan in 1916, suffering severe losses. Its remnants were eventually folded into the regular army.

=== Occupied Serbia (1916–1918) ===
The invading Central Powers forces occupied the entire territory of the Kingdom of Serbia. In the subsequent division of territories, Bulgarian occupied Serbia included Macedonia and the Morava region, reflecting Bulgarian nationalist aspirations. Austro-Hungarian occupied Serbia included Old Serbia (Serbia minus Kosovo and Macedonia) while the rest of the Kingdom was under joint Central Powers occupation. Chetnik guerrillas started organising a resistance network against both military occupations. In the mountains of the Bulgarian zone, former Serbian soldiers, hiding from the Bulgarian army, got organised into Chetnik units.

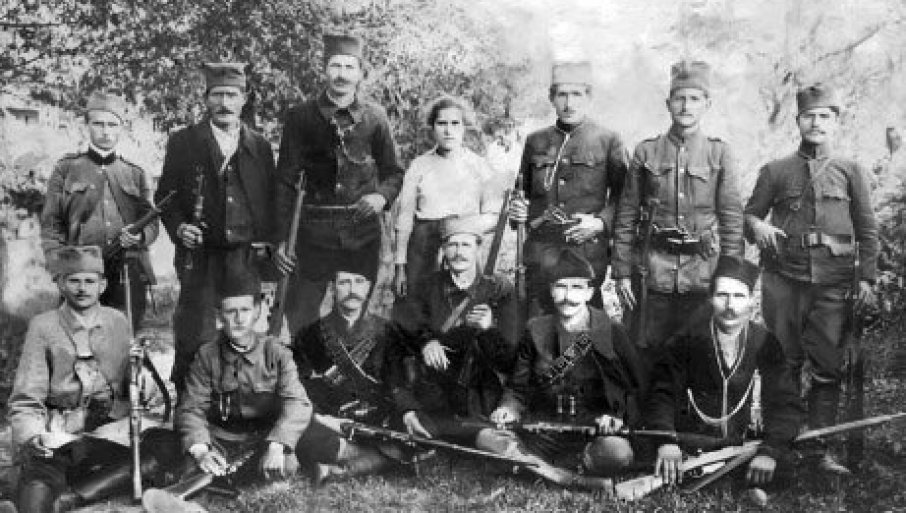
Dimitrije Begović (second from top left) commander of the Jablanica Chetnik Detachment and one of the leaders of the Toplica uprising. c. 1917

In September 1916, the Serbian high command sent Chetnik commander Kosta Pećanac to organise a guerrilla uprising in the Toplica District of Bulgarian occupied Serbia. On 15 September, Pećanac landed by plane in the village of Mehane on the Radan mountain. Meeting up with local leader Kosta Vojinović, they both set up headquarters on Mount Kopaonik. Despite attempts by the Serbian Supreme Command to prevent premature large-scale guerrilla warfare, when rumors spread that the Allies had reached Skopje and the Bulgarians began conscripting all men between 18 and 45 years of age for military service in January–February 1917, the Serbs spontaneously rose in revolt. Serbian Chetniks, led by Vojinović, attacked garrisons in the region of Toplica, seizing a number of towns and villages including Prokuplje, Lebane and Kuršumlija.

The Bulgarian Supreme Command appointed Macedonia born, IMRO leader Alexander Protogerov, giving him full power to suppress the uprising. On 10 March, Protogerov issued an order to the Chetniks to surrender within five days or face execution, their homes burnt down, and their families deported. The Bulgarian army counter-attack started on 12 March, assisted by paramilitary IMRO forces under Tane Nikolov and Austro-Hungarian support. By 25 March, the insurgents had been pushed into the mountains which was followed by bloody reprisals against the civilian population, mass rapes were also perpetrated. Bulgarian soldiers killed over 20,000 Serbian civilians, primarily women, old people, and children. They deported more than 80,000 to concentration camps in Bulgaria, such as Sliven. According to the Austro-Hungarian consul, the Bulgarians burned down every village in the areas of the Toplica revolt. One infamous episode recounts the fate of the leader of the Jablanica Chetnik Detachment, Dimitrije Begović's pregnant wife and four children, who were reportedly killed after he refused to surrender or provide information on fellow Chetnik members. On 13 January 1918, Begović reportedly took his own life by detonating explosives after being surrounded by Bulgarian officers.

Despite the reprisals, Chetnik resistance continued and in April 1917, Pećanac's guerrillas attacked a railway station, and on 15 May, they invaded Bosilegrad before retreating to Kosovo, controlled by the Austro-Hungarians. Despite Allied efforts to open a new front in Salonika, the Serbian Army couldn't break through Bulgarian lines. After a short resurgence during the Summer of 1917 with a large battle fought in the Mount Kopaonik-Mount Jastrebac region, Pećanac disappeared again in September–October 1917. In response, the Austro-Hungarian command formed Albanian paramilitary units to hunt down the remaining Serbian rebels, as well counter-units composed of IMRO comitadjis sent from Macedonia. In October two companies of the Bulgarian 11th Infantry Regiment assisted by Bulgarian paramilitaries and one Austro-Hungarian machine-gun squad managed to track down and surround Vojnović who took his own life before they could capture him.

The following year, Serbian Chetnik units, including the survivors of the Jablanica Detachment, were again instrumental in the liberation of Serbia, as advances were made on the Salonika front.

==== Chetnik detachments after 1915 ====
- Toplica-South Morava (Central) Detachment, commanded by Kosta Pećanac.
- Jablanica Detachment, commanded by Milinko Vlahović, then Dimitrije Begović.
  - Tulare battalion, commanded by Milan Đurović.
  - Second Jablanica battalion.
  - Gajtan Detachment.
- Ibar-Kopaonik Detachment, commanded by Kosta Vojinović.
- Pirot Detachment, commanded by Jovan Radović.

== Casualties, disbandment and postwar legacy ==
Chetnik units sustained losses of around 60% of their forces, their use in direct frontal combat often led to devastating casualties, prompting some historians to suggest that they were sacrificed. In July 1914, prior to the invasion, the Habsburg army determined that Serb Chetniks, or Komitadjis, as the Austro-Hungarians called them, were "outside international law" and were to be "completely wiped out". The Chetniks' mixed attire, part military, part civilian, was used by the Austro-Hungarians to revive the existing myth of franc-tireurs, civilians acting as combatants, resulting in reprisals, and often war crimes, against the Serbian civilian populations. In Šabac, in retaliation for Chetnik activities, Austro-Hungarian troops executed between one hundred and two hundred civilians.

On 13 August, the Balkanstreitkräfte's Commander in Chief, General Potiorek ordered all units to seize hostages, carry out reprisal hangings, and engage in arson as part of a punitive strategy, in retaliation for Chetnik raids. In 1917, Adolf von Rhemen, the Military governor of Austro-Hungarian occupied Serbia, ordered their "ruthless extermination".

The Austro-Hungarian army also employed auxiliary troops, dressed in civilian clothing and consisting of irregular detachments from Bosnia. One such unit accompanied the 42nd Home Guard Infantry Division during the crossing into Serbia, pillaging and burning villages around Zvornik. In August 1914, sentries from the 21st Division mistook members of the paramilitary Schutzkorps for the enemy and opened fire. This confusion arose because the Schutzkorps did not wear a uniform; looked and sounded like Serbian Chetniks, identified only by their black-yellow armbands. In addition to units from Bosnia, Austro-Hungarian military also relied on Albanian irregulars, primarily clansmen from northern Albania and Kosovo, who were deployed in support roles along the southern front.

After the armistice of November 1918, most Chetnik detachments were demobilised or absorbed into the newly formed Royal Yugoslav Army. While the irregular formations ceased to exist, some of their leaders, such as Pećanac, remained politically active through nationalist veterans’ organisations. In 1921, Pećanac founded the Association of Serbian Chetniks for the King and Fatherland, which promoted a royalist and Serbian nationalist agenda during the interwar years. The memory of the First World War Chetniks was later invoked by the Yugoslav Army in the Homeland, the royalist resistance movement widely known as the Chetniks during the Second World War, as part of its symbolic lineage. (Note: Historian Milan Milićević emphasises that the Chetniks of the Balkan Wars, World War I and World War II were three distinct groups and historically separate phenomena.)

== See also ==
- Serbian Campaign of World War I
- Serbian Chetnik Organization
