= Uroš Kostić-Rudinac =

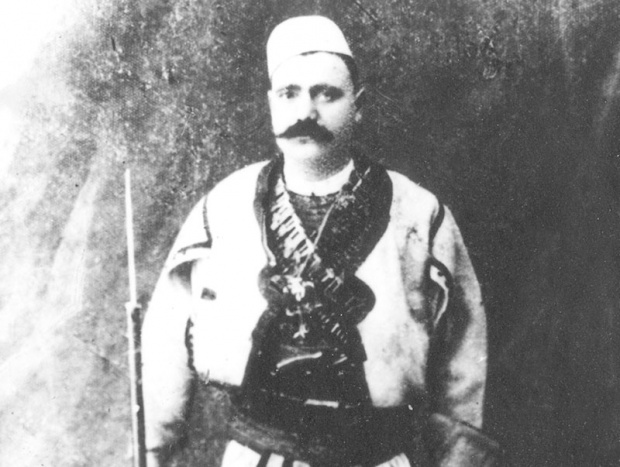
- Born: Unknown; Leposavić
- Died: 1917; Banjska Reka, near Zvečan, Serbia
- Military career
- Allegiance: Kingdom of Serbia; Chetniks
- Branch: Royal Serbian Army
- Service years: 1893–1908; 1915–1917
- Conflicts: Macedonian Struggle; World War I: Toplica Uprising †

Uroš Kostić Rudinac was one of the leaders of the Toplica Uprising in the occupied Kingdom of Serbia during World War I.

== Early life ==
Uroš Kostić Rudinac lived in the area of Leposavić. Kostic was an experienced fighter, as he took part in Chetnik actions from 1903 until 1912.

== World War I ==
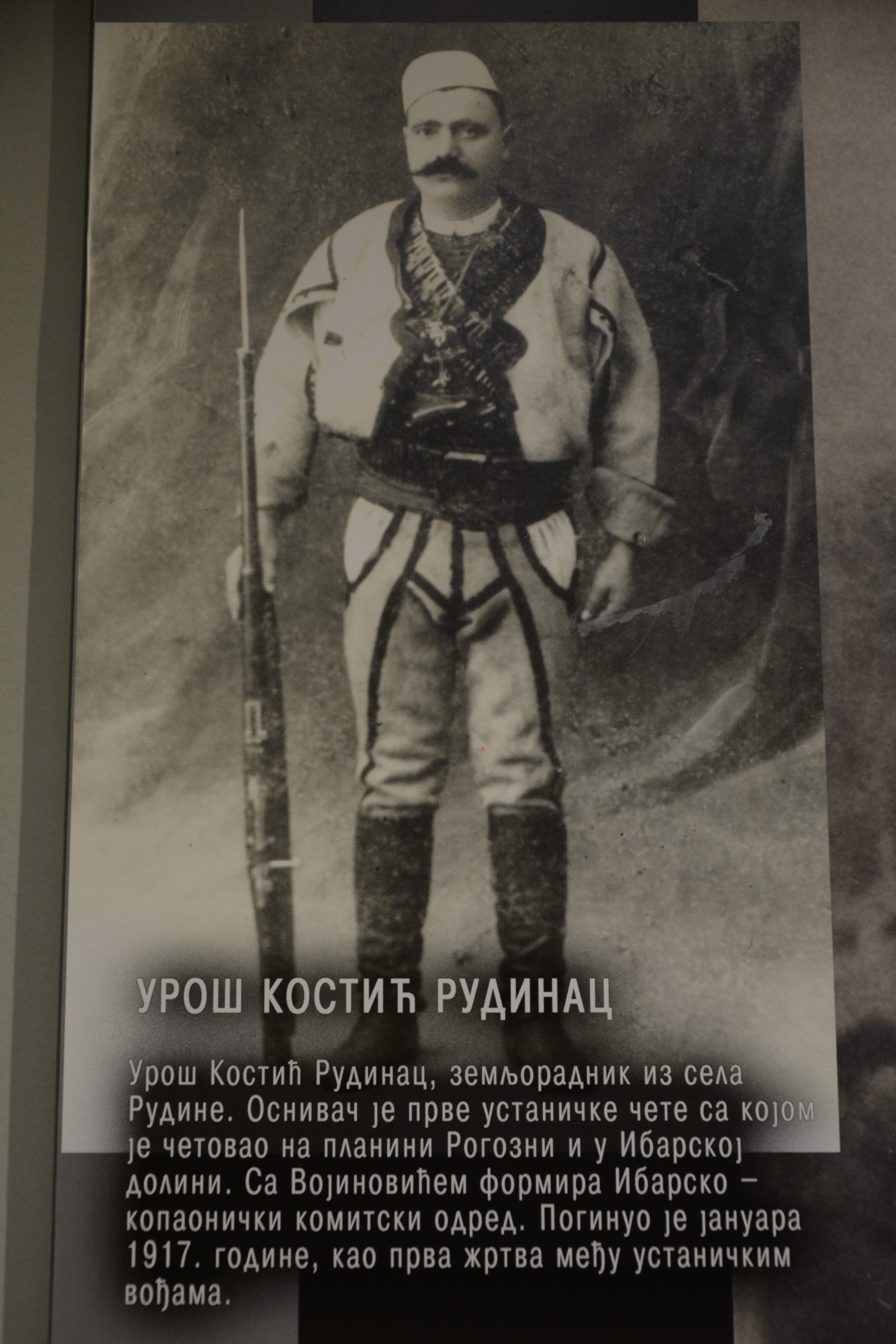
Memorial of Rudinac in the National Museum of Toplica

In the First World War, when Austria-Hungary introduced the occupation administration at the end of 1915. The same year, Kostic defected. He was a mysterious man for whom the Austro - Hungarian intelligence officers in their reports in the spring of 1916 who used the name Uroš Belaković and Uroš Bečanović and linked it to the area around Gornji Milanovac and Kragujevac. The governor issued a warrant for the person.

In the summer of 1916, intelligence officers linked the person to Chetnik activities in the area around Kosovska Mitrovica. In the second half of November 1916, when the man appeared in the village of Sočanica, someone reported to the occupation authorities that he was from those parts. The military authorities put the dice together and determined that he was born in Kosovo, from the village of Rudine under the Rogozna mountain. Until the appearance of Kosta Vojinović, Rudinac played a significant role. He created the first reliable network of hideouts and commissioners, encouraged chatting and prepared for combat action. The first real guerrilla company, apart from Vojinović and Rudinac, numbered four more fighters: Aleksandar Piper from Kosovska Mitrovica, Vlajko Vladisavljević from Leposavić, Proko Planić from Zemanica and Radomir Gašić from Kopaonik.

When other insurgent leaders soon appeared, Uroš Kostić fell into the shadows to some extent, but he always remained among the most important. He was indisputably the creator of the organization in the Novi Pazar district, and Kosta Vojinović and Rudinac worked together in the Zvečan district. His family was arrested and then interned.

At the beginning of 1917, manhunts for Kostić became more frequent. Enemy soldiers searched Mount Rogozna in detail. Then, Rudinac broke up the company into several smaller groups, so that they could move unnoticed to the Novi Pazar district. There were also numerous chases in this area, which Kostić initially successfully avoided. One chase reached him in Banjska Reka. A fight developed in which Kostic died at the beginning of February. Ten days later, Kosta Vojinović wrote in his diary: "Uroš Kostić died of treason."
