= Milinko Vlahović =

Montenegrin military officer

vojvoda Milinko Vlahović
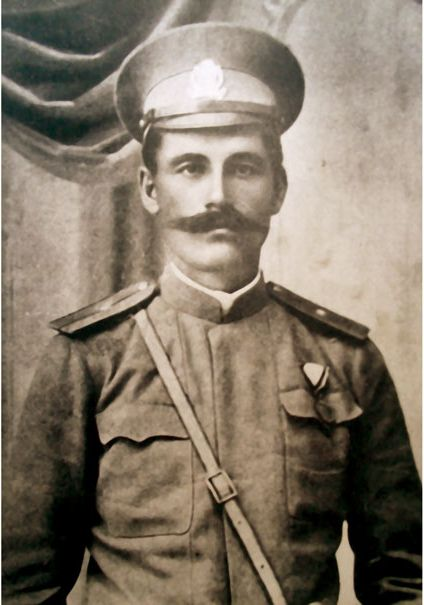
- Born: 1 May 1881; Kolašin, Principality of Montenegro
- Died: 6 December 1930 (aged 49); Belgrade, Kingdom of Yugoslavia
- Children: Veljko Vlahović
- Military career
- Allegiance: Montenegro; Yugoslavia
- Conflicts: Balkan Wars; World War I Toplica Uprising

Milinko Vlahović (1 May 1881 – 6 December 1930) was a captain of the Montenegrin army, one of the leaders Jablanics-Toplica Uprising in World War I, Duke, and a commander of the Jablanics-Toplics Detachment and lieutenant colonel in the Serbian Army. He was a brother of Toško Vlahović and a father to Yugoslavian World War 2 hero Veljko Vlahović.

== Biography ==
=== Early career ===
As a child, Milinko Vlahović showed a penchant for military service. He graduated at the Montenegrin Military Academy in Cetinje. During the Balkan Wars, as a lieutenant, he commanded the first company of the Rovački Battalion, which became famous in the fights against the Turks.

In World War I he participated as a Class I Captain. During Battle of Mojkovac he commanded the Rovač Battalion of the Kolašin Brigade, where he showed great courage and ability to command. After the capitulation of Montenegro in 1916, Vlahović, then captain of the Montenegrin army, and his brother Toško Vlahović, a student of philosophy escaped the capture. He did not recognize the capitulation and defected with his brother in the spring and formed a resistance group of twenty people, attempting to harass occupational forces.

After the Romania entered the war, with several other četas (nine in total), they set out for Serbia in September 1916, with the intention of entering Russia via Romania and to continue their resistance from there. However, when he reached Kopaonik and learned that the Toplica Uprising was being prepared and, therefore, he headed for Jablanica, where he formed a Jablanics-Toplics Detachment.

=== Toplica uprising ===
At the beginning of October, they arrived in Toplica and there contacted Kosta Pećanac, who had come from the Salonika front a little earlier, sent by the Serbian Supreme Command. The Vlahović brothers and Jovan Radović with Kosta Vojinović started organizing and leading the Toplica Uprising in 1917.

At the conference in Obilić (Pusta Reka), his title of duke was confirmed, as well as the command over the Jablanica detachment He was the only professional soldier with the rank of captain in the uprising. Code Major a is 24. February and 1917. destroyed the company Bulgarians, which started the uprising. On his own initiative, he liberated Medveđa, Žitni Potok, Lebane, and he also prepared an attack on Leskovac. His detachment held the front from Doljevac to Lebane, in the length of 40 kilometres.

Toško was killed in a battle with Bulgarian units on 2 November 1917, while Milinko Vlahović and Radović remained in the south of Serbia, mostly in Toplica District, until the end of the war. In the breakthrough Salonika front, he participated in the liberation of Montenegro and Herzegovina (Nikšić, Trebinje). He also took part in the Christmas Rebellion in Montenegro and organized defense of Rovca region.

=== Later life ===
After the war, Vlahović lived in Belgrade. He remained in the army and reached the rank of lieutenant colonel. He was buried in Belgrade New Cemetery.

== Literature ==
- Ilić, Dobrosav (2006). Popov, Čedomir (ed.). Srpski biografski recnik knjiga 2, V-G. Novi Sad: Matica Srpska. ISBN 978-86-83651-62-7.
- Braća Vlahović 1917: prilozi za istoriografiju Topličkog ustanka. Stručna knjiga. 1988. ISBN 978-86-419-0009-5.
- Rakočević, Novica (1988). Dragičević, Risto (ed.). "Bjekstvo 17 Montenegrins from occupied Montenegro in 1917" (PDF). Historical Records. 3–4. Titograd: Istorijski institut SR Crne Gore: 211–214. ISSN 0021-2652.
- Todorović, Dragoje (1998). "Solunci govore: Ovako je bilo". Srpsko Nasledje. 10. NIP Glas.
