= Biljana Jovanović =

Yugoslav author, peace activist and feminist

- Born: 28 January 1953; Belgrade, FPR Yugoslavia
- Died: 11 March 1996 (aged 43); Ljubljana, Slovenia
- Occupations: Author, peace activist, and feminist
- Spouse(s): Dragan Lakićević; Rastko Močnik

Biljana Jovanović (Serbian Cyrillic: Биљана Јовановић; 28 January 1953 – 11 March 1996) was a Yugoslav author of Montenegrin origin, peace activist, and feminist. She published poetry, novels and plays and was heavily involved in the peace movement during the breakup of Yugoslavia in the early 1990s.

== Life ==
Jovanović was born in Belgrade, Yugoslavia, (now Serbia), on 28 January 1953. Her father was a Yugoslav Montenegrin Communist military official and politician, Batrić Jovanović, mother Olga Cetkovic was a journalist, and her brother Pavle was a jurist, professor at the University of Novi Sad. She graduated from the University of Belgrade with a degree in philosophy. She married the writer Dragan Lakićević while a student; they later divorced. In the late 1980s she married the Slovenian sociologist Rastko Močnik and they split their time between Ljubljana, Slovenia, and Belgrade. Jovanović died of a brain tumor in Ljubljana on 11 March 1996.

== Work ==
She published a book of poems in 1977, while still a student and followed it with a novel, Avala is Falling (Pada Avala), the following year. Jovanović published two more novels in the early 1980s, The Dogs and the Others (Psi i ostali) in 1980 and My Soul, My Only Child (Duša, jedinica moja) in 1984. Interspersed were four plays, two each in the 1980s and 1990s.

In Jovanović's novel Pada Avala, a young woman challenges the prevailing expectations that parents, teachers, doctors, bus drivers, and others have from her; representing a new character in the Yugoslav literary world at the time. Dogs and Others, her first novel published in full in English, deals with dysfunctional Yugoslavia, a society in existential crisis, caught between East and West, tradition and postmodernity. With her pioneering themes and style, Jovanović is now considered a major avant-garde writer.

== Activities ==
Jovanović was also a public intellectual who helped to found the Committee for the Defense of Artistic Freedoms (Odbor za zaštitu umetničkih sloboda), a part of the Association of Serbian Writers (Udruženje književnika Srbije), in 1982, serving as its president for a time. As the association grew more nationalistic in the late 1980s, Jovanović distanced herself from it. She embraced the anti-nationalist movement in the early 1990s, organizing protests calling for peace and tolerance. She was one of the founders of Civil Resistance Movement (Civilni pokret otpora), in 1992 and, later that year, of the Flying Classroom Workshop (Leteća učionica radionica), an artistic project trying to connect Yugoslavs in an already partly dismembered country.

== Biljana Jovanović Award ==
Biljana Jovanović Award was established in her honor by Srpsko književno društvo in 2005, and has been awarded annually since then. The recipients include Srdjan Valjarević, Danica Vukićević, Ibrahim Hadžic, Nemanja Mitrović, Uglješa Šajtinac, Jelena Lengold, among others.
