= Kolašinac =

Surname list

- Language: Bosnian

Origin
- Origin: Kolašin, Montenegro
- Meaning: a man from Kolašin

Kolašinac is a surname, a demonym for people from Kolašin, a town in northern Montenegro; it is derived from family ancestors who adopted it after leaving the town. It is borne by Bosniaks.

- Asmir Kolašinac (born 1984), Serbian shot putter of Bosniak origin
- Sead Kolašinac (born 1993), Bosnian footballer
