= Ivan Charota =

Belarusian literary critic and historian (1952–2024)

- Born: Ivan Alexeyevich Charota; 16 September 1952; Lyshchyki, Kobryn District, Brest Oblast, Byelorussian SSR, USSR
- Died: 7 November 2024 (aged 72)
- Education: Belarus State University
- Occupations: Writer; translator; critic
- Writing career
- Language: Serbian, Russian, Belarusian, Ukrainian, Croatian, Macedonian
- Years active: 1974–2024
- Notable works: Anthology of Belarusian poetry (1993, 2012), Anthology of Belarusian Christian poetry (2001), Belarus and Serbia (2016)
- Notable awards: For spiritual revival, Belarus (2003, 2019), The Threehanded Mother of God, US (2011), St. Sava 3rd degree, Serbia (2004), Medal of Alexander Pushkin, Russia, (2015)

Ivan Alexeyevich Charota (Belarusian: Іван Аляксеевіч Чарота; 16 September 1952 – 7 November 2024) was a Belarusian literary critic, Slavist, critic, historian of culture, translator. He was a Doctor of Philological Sciences 1998, and professor since 1999. He was a Laureate of the Republic of Belarus Prize for Spiritual Revival 2003. Foreign member of the Serbian Academy of Sciences and Arts 2009. Member of the Association of Writers of Belarus, the Association of Writers of Russia and the Association of Writers of Serbia 1985.

== Biography ==
Ivan Alexeyevich Charota was born on September 16, 1952, in the village of Lishchyki, Kobrin region, Brest Region, in Soviet Belarus.

From 1969 to 1974 he studied at the Department of Russian Language and Literature at the Faculty of Philology of the Belarusian State University. After completing the studies, he worked for three years as a teacher at the Palackishka High School of the Voronezh district, Grodno region. In 1977 he was hired by Belarusian State University, as a lecturer – senior lecturer, associate professor, and after defending his PhD dissertation (studies lasting from 1991 until 1994, he became the head of the newly formed Chair of Slavic Studies (Slovene literature). His Candidate dissertation «Творчество М.А. Шолохова и литературный процесс Югославии (1956–1986)», was defended at the Institute in Leningrad in 1986), and his PhD dissertation «Беларуская літаратура ХХ стагоддзя і працэсы нацыянальнага самавызначэння» at the Belarus State University in Minsk, 1998.

Charota died in November 2024, at the age of 72.

== Scientific papers and books ==
Charota's scientific interests are directed primarily on the literature and culture of Slovenian people. Investigating their genetic, typological and concrete connections, he became a leading Yugoslavist of Belarus, a specialist in the field of comparative literature and culture, the author of some 600 scientific publications, among which are the books: «Беларуская савецкая літаратура за мяжой» (Minsk, 1988 – у сааўтарстве), «Пошук спрадвечнай існасці: Беларуская літаратура ХХ стагоддзя ў працэсах нацыянальнага самавызначэння» (Minsk, 1995), «Сербская Праваслаўная Царква» (Minsk, 1998), «Беларуская мова і Царква» (Minsk, 2000), «Косовская битва продолжается» (Minsk, 2000), «Антологиjа белоруске поезиjе», (Belgrade: 1993; 2-е ed. – 2012), «Югаславянскія казкі» (Minsk, 1999), «Антологиjа лирике источних Словена" (Belgrade, 2000), «Насустрач Духу. Анталогія беларускай хрысціянскай паэзіі» (Minsk, 2001), «Насустрач Духу. Анталогія беларускай хрысціянскай прозы» (Minsk, 2002), «Слово и Дух. Антология русской духовной поезии ХХ –ХХ вв.» (Minsk, 2003, 2005, 2010), "Ні на небе, ні на зямлі.Казкі славянскіх народаў" (2013), «Српска књижевност. Антологија текстова. Књ.І -V» (Minsk, 2002–2007 – на сербскай мове), "Тэорыя і практыка мастацкага перакладу" (Minsk, 2012), "Испод крила роде. Антологиjа савремене белоруске поезиjе" (Podgorica, 2014), "Беларусы пра Сербію-Югаславію" (Minsk, 2015), « Белорусија и Србија: Трагом узајамног упознавања и деловања" (Šabac, 2016).

== Academic work ==
Charota was a member of 11 journal editorial boards (6 foreign), scientific adviser of the Belarusian Encyclopedia; Secretary of the Bible Commission of the Belarusian Exarchate of the Russian Orthodox Church and editor of the journal Orthodoxy (Праваслаўе).

In the scientific-methodological sphere, the professor compiled the following manuals: «Советская литература в связях и взаимодействиях: Начала сравнительного и системного анализа» (Minsk, 1989), «Мастацкі пераклад на беларускую мову : Асновы тэорыі і практычныя рэкамендацыі» (Minsk, 1997), «Югаславянскія літаратуры і культуры» (Minsk, 1999 – у сааўтарстве), Праграма «Гісторыя славянскіх літаратур» (2000), «Гісторыя сербскай літаратуры. Практыкум» (2007).

== Translations ==
Charota was the head of the Bureau for the Translation and Literary Association of the Association of Writers of Belarus, and published translations from Serbian, Croatian, Slovenian, Macedonian, Polish and other languages into Belarusian and Russian, as well as from Belarusian and Russian into Serbian. He produced more than 1200 printed translations, including over 70 books, including works by: Pavle, Serbian Patriarch, Nikolaj Velimirović, Justin Popović, Marko S. Marković, Elder Tadej Štrbulović, Ivo Andrić, Branislav Nušić, Rade Drainac, Dobrica Ćosić, Nevena Vitošević-Čeklić, Zoran Gavrilović, Mira Radojević, Ljubodrag Dimić, Momir Lazić, Dragan Lakićević, Dragoslav Mihailović, Grozdana Olujić, Goran Petrović, Ljiljana Habjanović Đurović, Beno Zupančič, Prežihov Voranc, Josip Jurčič, Drago Jančar, and others. He was the founder, compiler and translator of the series «Сербскае багаслоўе ХХ стагоддзя», in which more than forty books have already been published.

His collection of Serbian folk tales was translated into Belarusian: ”Мовы ўсяго жывога: Сербскія народныя казкі” (Minsk: Мастацкая літаратурa, 2007), and was pronounced the most beautiful book in Belarus in the category of translations 2008 and awarded the National Award.

Charota was one of the founders of the "Committee for Support of Serbs and Montenegrins" and the public organization "Belarus – Sister of Serbia", acting vice-president of the "Belarus-Yugoslavia Society", president of the "Belarus-Serbia-Montenegro Society".

He was a member of the Association of Writers of the USSR (now: the Association of Writers of Belarus), as well as Russia and Serbia; his work appears in the press as a literary critic, critic, essayist, and publicist.

== Awards ==
- the prize of the Republic of Belarus "For spiritual revival" (2003)
- International Prize of K. Ostroški (Poland, 1999)
- International Prize of Fjodor Dostojevsky's name (Serbia, 2007) (given in 2012)
- Prize of the Association of Writers of Serbia (2000)
- Prize of the journal "Збиља / Reality" (YU, Belgrade, 2000, 2006);
- International Orthodox Literary Prize "The Threehanded Mother of God" (Serbian Foundation Ivanka Milošević – (Chicago, United States, 2011)
- International Literary Prize of Rade Drainac (Serbia, 2014)
- International Award of the Karić Foundation (Serbia, 2014)
- Order of St. Sergei Radonješki 3rd degree (Russian Orthodox Church, 2002)
- commemorative medal of the Association of Slovak Writers (2003)
- Order of St. Sava 3rd degree (Serbian Orthodox Church, 2004)
- Golden sign of the Cultural and Educational Community of Serbia (2008)
- Order of St. Cyril Turovsky 2nd degree (Belarusian Orthodox Church, 2012)
- Silver Medal "For Merits" (Serbia, 2014)
- Medal of Alexander Pushkin (Russia, 2015).
- the prize of the Republic of Belarus "For spiritual revival" (2019)

== Literature ==
- Чарота, Иван (2017). Белоруско-српски односи као научни проблем : [приступна беседа одржана у САНУ, 26. октобра 2015. године]. Београд: САНУ. pp. 55–68.
- Гардзіцкі А.К. Чарота Іван Аляксеевіч // Беларускія пісьменнік:Даведнік. Мінск,1994.С.584.
- Гарэлік Л.М, Махнач Т.М. Чарота Іван //Беларускія пісьменнікі: Біябібліяграфічны слоўнік. Т. 6. Мінск, 1995. С. 275 – 277.
- Ляшук В.Я., Снітко Г.Н. Літаратура Берасцейшчыны. Брэст, 1999. С.326, 368.
- Трус М. В. Чарота Іван Аляксеевіч // Беларуская Энцыклапедыя. У 18 т. Т. 17. Мінск, 2003. С.245.
- Б.п. Чарота Иван Алексеевич // Регионы Белоруссии. Энциклопедия. Т.1. Кн. 2. Минск, 2009. С. 453.
- Б.п. // Філалагічны факультэт. Да 70-годдзя заснавання. Мінск : БДУ, 2009. С. 133–136.
- Сибиновић М. Чарота Иван // Енциклопедија српског народа. – Београд, 2008. С.1249.
- Навойчык П. Чарота Іван Аляксеевіч // Гісторыя славянскіх літаратур і праблемы іх параўнальнага вывучэння: тэорыя і практыка. –Мінск, 2015.С. 141–142.
- Штэйнер І. З любоўю да славянскага пісьменства // Полымя.2017, No.9. С. 39–42.
