= Kolašin =

Town and municipality in Northern Montenegro

Kolašin Колашин
- Town and municipality
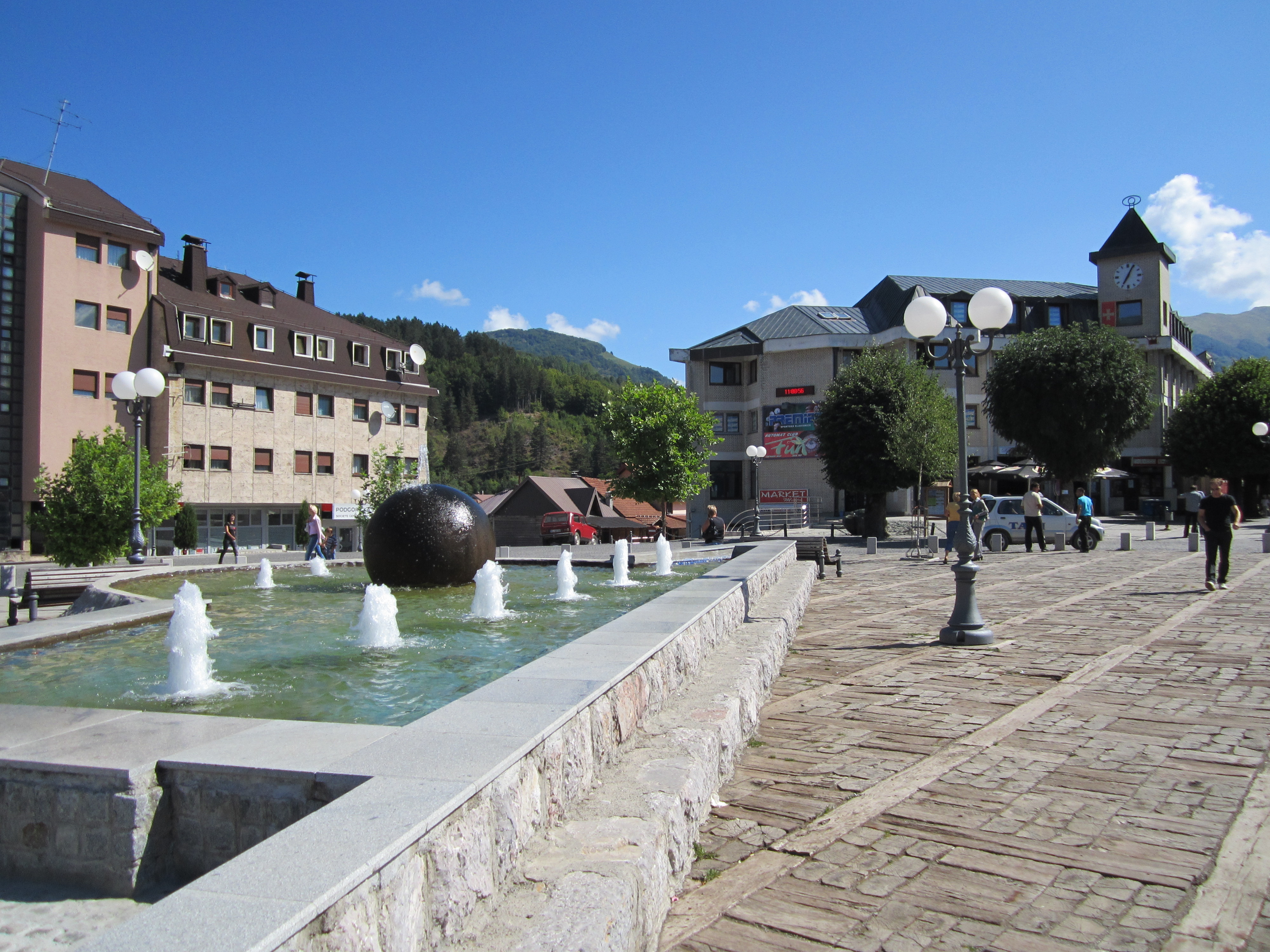
- Main town square in Kolašin

- Coat of arms

- Location of Kolašin in Montenegro
- Coordinates: 42°49′25″N 19°31′21″E
- Country: Montenegro
- Region: Northern
- Municipality: Kolašin
- Founded: 17th century
- Settlements: 70

Government
  - Type: Mayor-Assembly
  - Mayor: Petko Bakić (Democratic Montenegro)

Area
  - Town and municipality: 897 km^{2} (346 sq mi)

Population (2011 census)
  - Density: 11/km^{2} (28/sq mi)
  - Urban: 2,725
  - Rural: 5,655
  - Municipality: 8,380
- Time zone: UTC+1 (CET)
  - Summer (DST): UTC+2 (CEST)
- Postal code: 81210
- Area code: +382 20
- ISO 3166 code: ME-09
- Vehicle registration: KL
- Website: http://www.opstinakolasin.me/

Kolašin (Montenegrin Cyrillic: Колашин, pronounced [kɔlǎʃin]) is a town in northern Montenegro. It has a population of 2,418 (2023 census). Kolašin is the centre of Kolašin Municipality (population 9,949) and an unofficial centre of Morača region, named after Morača River. Kolašin is also a centre of winter tourism and pearl of Northern Montenegro. Kolašin is full of hotels and apartments for rent during the skiing season, but last years town is also very crowded during summer because of famous mountains around Bjelasica, Sinjajevina and Komovi, hiking destinations, relaxing ambience, pleasant summer temperatures during the hottest days of the summer and numerous sports events. In 2023, Kolasin hosted the MOSI Games and gathered around 2,000 athletes in the city. Lisnati sir and smočani kačamak is originally from Kolašin. The largest number of tourists come from Israel, France, Italy, Spain, Poland, Germany, Slovakia, UK, USA and the Balkan countries.

== Etymology ==
Rebecca West wrote that the district was originally named Kol I Shen, which is Albanian for 'St. Nicholas', which was inhabited by Catholic Albanians who converted to Islam and who were expelled in 1858 by local tribes.

== History ==
=== Late modern ===
Rebecca Wests visited the town of Kolasin in the 1930s where she learned that in the 18th century, Catholic Albanians and Orthodox Montenegrins lived in peace. In 1858, however, several Montenegrin tribes attacked the town and destroyed all the inhabitants who had kept their Albanian identity or who were Muslim.

During this period, Kolašin was home to a significant Albanian community. They were largely expelled in different waves during the late 19th century expulsion of the Albanians fleeing to Turkey, Kosovo (Pristina) and Macedonia. The Montenegrin forces also robbed the Albanians before the expulsion.

=== Contemporary ===
The Bulgarian foreign ministry compiled a report about the five kazas (districts) of the sanjak of the Novi Pazar in 1901-02. According to the Bulgarian report, the kaza of Kolašin was almost entirely populated by Albanians. According to it, the kaza of Kolašin had 27 Albanian villages with 732 households and 5 Serb villages with 75 households.

== Climate ==
The Köppen Climate Classification subtype for this climate is Dfb. (Warm Summer Continental Climate).

Climate data for Kolasin (1991–2020 normals, extremes 1947–present)
| Month | Jan | Feb | Mar | Apr | May | Jun | Jul | Aug | Sep | Oct | Nov | Dec | Year |
|---|---|---|---|---|---|---|---|---|---|---|---|---|---|
| Record high °C (°F) | 15.1 (59.2) | 19.3 (66.7) | 22.7 (72.9) | 27.2 (81.0) | 33.0 (91.4) | 32.7 (90.9) | 35.2 (95.4) | 37.1 (98.8) | 32.7 (90.9) | 28.4 (83.1) | 25.4 (77.7) | 16.4 (61.5) | 37.1 (98.8) |
| Mean daily maximum °C (°F) | 3.6 (38.5) | 5.0 (41.0) | 8.8 (47.8) | 13.7 (56.7) | 18.6 (65.5) | 22.8 (73.0) | 25.3 (77.5) | 25.9 (78.6) | 20.5 (68.9) | 15.8 (60.4) | 10.0 (50.0) | 4.1 (39.4) | 14.5 (58.1) |
| Mean daily minimum °C (°F) | −5.1 (22.8) | −4.3 (24.3) | −1.6 (29.1) | 1.9 (35.4) | 5.8 (42.4) | 9.1 (48.4) | 10.3 (50.5) | 10.3 (50.5) | 7.4 (45.3) | 3.9 (39.0) | 0.2 (32.4) | −3.7 (25.3) | 2.8 (37.0) |
| Record low °C (°F) | −29.8 (−21.6) | −23.4 (−10.1) | −20 (−4) | −10.1 (13.8) | −5.4 (22.3) | −3.0 (26.6) | 1.0 (33.8) | 1.0 (33.8) | −5.4 (22.3) | −9.0 (15.8) | −21.6 (−6.9) | −22.8 (−9.0) | −29.8 (−21.6) |
| Average precipitation mm (inches) | 185.9 (7.32) | 191.7 (7.55) | 184.1 (7.25) | 165.7 (6.52) | 135.2 (5.32) | 96.3 (3.79) | 75.1 (2.96) | 60.5 (2.38) | 163.5 (6.44) | 221.5 (8.72) | 301.2 (11.86) | 275.8 (10.86) | 2,056.5 (80.96) |
| Average precipitation days (≥ 1 mm) | 11.5 | 11.9 | 11.7 | 12.4 | 12.8 | 9.4 | 7.9 | 6.2 | 9.1 | 10.0 | 11.8 | 13.1 | 127.8 |
| Average relative humidity (%) | 84 | 82 | 79 | 78 | 79 | 80 | 78 | 79 | 82 | 82 | 85 | 86 | 81 |
| Mean monthly sunshine hours | 78.8 | 89.5 | 129.3 | 147.9 | 188.0 | 193.2 | 245.8 | 234.7 | 184.6 | 152.1 | 92.9 | 68.5 | 1,805.3 |
Source 1: National Oceanic and Atmospheric Administration
Source 2: Hydrological and Meteorological Service of Montenegro (humidity, sun 1961–1990)

== Sports ==
The local football team is former third tier club FK Gorštak, who play their home games at the Stadion u Lugu. The town's basketball team is KK Gorštak. Lug, settlement along the Tara river, is the big sport centre in Northern Montenegro.

== Tourism ==
Kolašin is one of the centres of Montenegro's mountain tourism. Although Žabljak is considered more attractive destination, Kolašin has the advantage of being easily accessible by road and rail.

Kolašin is located on the foot of Bjelasica and Sinjajevina mountains, which offer great conditions for skiing. Because of Kolašin's altitude (954 m), the town is considered an air spa.

Biogradska Gora national park is in the town's vicinity, and is considered a premium tourist attraction. The development of Kolašin as a tourist destination is bolstered by opening of Bianca Resort & Spa, a luxury resort in town's center. Along Bianca, Sheraton, Crowne Plaza, Dukley Retreat, Montis, Bjelasica 1450 and Swissotel are also ready for guests during all-year.

In 2024, the Kolasin Valleys ski resort was opened 9 km from the city.

== Transport ==
Kolašin is connected with rest of Montenegro by two-laned motorways. It is situated on the main road connecting Montenegro's coast and Podgorica with northern Montenegro and Serbia (E65, E80). Mateševo, village in Kolašin municipality, connects Kolašin with Podgorica and southern Montenegro.

Through Bjelasica, tunnel was cut which connects Berane and Kolašin. In plan is also a Kolašin bypass which will connect settlement of Selište with Skrbuša via Kolašin Railway station. Bypass will reduce traffic in city centre and traffic jams during summer and winter season.

Kolašin is also a station on Belgrade–Bar railway.

Podgorica Airport is 80 km (50 mi) away, and has regular flights to major European destinations.

== Media ==
- Ozon Radio

== People ==
- Slavko Labović, a Danish Serbian actor
- Veljko Vlahović, Montenegrin communist politician
- Vlado Šćepanović, a Montenegrin professional basketball coach and former player
- Gavrilo V, Serbian Patriarch, 41st Patriarch of the Serbian Orthodox Church
- Milovan Jakšić, football goalkeeper for the Kingdom of Yugoslavia, semi-finalist of the 1930 World Cup
- Amfilohije Radović, Serbian Orthodox metropolitan bishop
- Old Rashko, a Serbian storyteller and gusle player
- Milo Dožić, Montenegrin politician and president of the National Assembly of the Kingdom of Montenegro
- Milinko Vlahović, a captain of the Montenegrin army, one of the leaders of the Jablanica-Toplica Uprising, Duke and lieutenant colonel in the Serbian army
- Sekula Drljević, a Montenegrin and Yugoslav fascist, jurist, politician, orator and theoretician
- National heroes: Uroš Bulatović, Veljko Vlahović, Spasoje Dragović, Savo Drljević, Boško Janković, Vukman Kruščić, Milutin Lakićević, Jelica Mašković, Savo Mašković, Janko Ćirović
- Batrić Jovanović, a Yugoslav politician and diplomat, member of the partisan movement in the Second World War, ambassador of the SFRY to UNESCO
- Minja Vojvodić, a Serbian actor and stuntman
- Dragan Lakićević, a Serbian poet, storyteller, novelist, translator and editor of literature
- Miljan Radović, a Yugoslav communist politician, president of the Presidency of the Central Committee of the League of Communists of Montenegro
- Danica Drašković, a Serbian lawyer, journalist and writer
- Pavle Bulatović, politician, Minister of Internal Affairs of Montenegro and Minister of Defense of the Federal Republic of Yugoslavia
- Milovan Bojić, a Serbian medical doctor, administrator and politician
- Predrag Bulatović, a Montenegrin politician, member of the Parliament of Montenegro and vice-president of the Democratic People's Party
- Dragan Kujović, a politician and professor, Minister of Education and Science, acting President of Montenegro (2003)

== See also ==
- Bjelasica Mountain
- Biogradska Gora National Park
- Tourism in Montenegro
