= Toplica Uprising =

Mass uprising in Serbia during World War I

- Part of Serbian campaign
Date	21 February – 25 March 1917; (1 month and 4 days)
Location	Toplica District, Bulgarian-occupied Kingdom of Serbia (present-day Serbia)
Result	Austro-Bulgarian victory; Uprising suppressed

Belligerents
(Kingdom of Serbia) Serbian insurgents; Chetniks	Kingdom of Bulgaria; Austria-Hungary

Commanders and leaders
Kosta Vojinović; Kosta Pećanac; Uroš Kostić-Rudinac †; Milinko Vlahović	Alexander Protogerov; Petar Darvingov; Tane Nikolov

Units involved
Chetnik detachments: Toplica; Jablanica; Ibar-Kopaonik; Pirot; Krajina	Morava Oblast forces; IMARO detachments; Albanian detachments

Strength
Between 4,000 and 15,000	Estimated 30,000 men (with involvement of 25,000 to 26,000 in operations); (Tsardom of Bulgaria (1908–1946)) Around 15 battalions with 22 machine guns and 28 cannons

Casualties and losses
- c. 20,000 Serbian civilian casualties in penal expeditions

The Toplica Uprising (Serbian: Топлички устанак) was a mass uprising by Serbian rebels against the Bulgarian occupation forces that took place in the Bulgarian-occupied Kingdom of Serbia during the First World War. The rebels were motivated by grievances against the Bulgarian authorities for ordering conscription of local Serbs in the Bulgarian army, forced labor and the denationalization policy imposed on the indigenous population. The revolt was supported by Serbian guerrilla fighters known as Chetniks.

The uprising lasted from 21 February to 25 March 1917. It was the only uprising in an occupied country during the entire First World War.

== Background ==
In October 1915, the Kingdom of Serbia, which had throughout the fall of 1914 managed to withstand and repel three Austro-Hungarian invasions, found itself under attack again. This time it was a joint Austro-Hungarian, German, and Bulgarian invasion from two directions that included Austro-Hungarian Third Army, German Eleventh Army, and Bulgarian First and Second armies. Outnumbered and outmatched, the Serbian Army was defeated by December 1915. However, rather than surrendering and capitulating, the Serbian military and political leaders decided on a long and arduous army retreat south towards Albania, hoping to reach the Adriatic coast for evacuation and regrouping. This resulted in the invading Central Powers forces occupying the entire territory of the Kingdom of Serbia. In the immediate division of spoils, Kingdom of Bulgaria gained the area of Pomoravlje, which had been a target of Bulgarian nationalism.

== Prelude ==
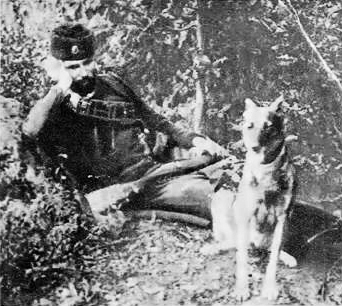
Kosta Pećanac in the Toplica district.

The primary causes of the rebellion were the policies passed by the occupiers. Constant denationalization, including closing Serbian schools, prohibition of the Serbian language and traditions, burning of books, and looting, requisition, and internment, provoked the population. Romania entering the war in August 1916 awakened hope in the Serbian population of a breakthrough of the Salonika front, some arming themselves and taking to the forests. Kosta Vojinović began the organization of resistance, and in the summer of 1916, established a band in Leposavić, the core of the future Ibar–Kopaonik Detachment. At the end of September 1916, the Serbian High Command sent Kosta Pećanac, reserve infantry lieutenant and veteran Chetnik Vojvoda, by airplane into Toplica. He was tasked to establish a secret resistance organization to be activated when the Allies and the Serbian Army were to break the Salonika front and arrive at Skoplje. The peak of Serbian discontent came with the Bulgarian announcement of conscription of local Serbs aged 18–45 for military service in the Bulgarian army on 14 February 1917. Massive flights to the mountains from Bulgarian recruit commissions began. The first armed conflicts between fleeing conscripts and Bulgarian chases began after 20 February.

== Uprising ==
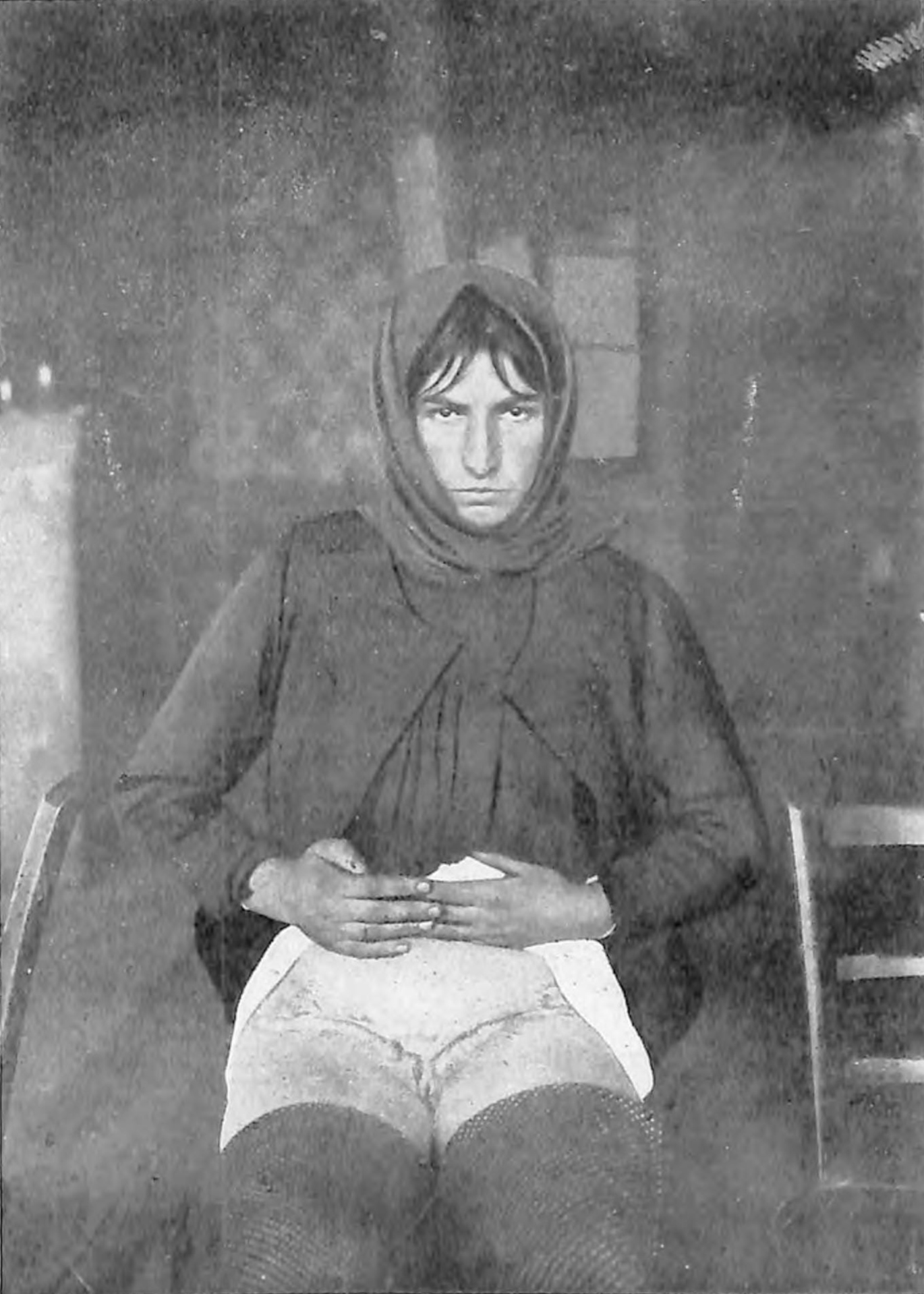
Woman from Toplica displaying the scars she received as a result of being branded with red hot iron by Bulgarian soldiers.

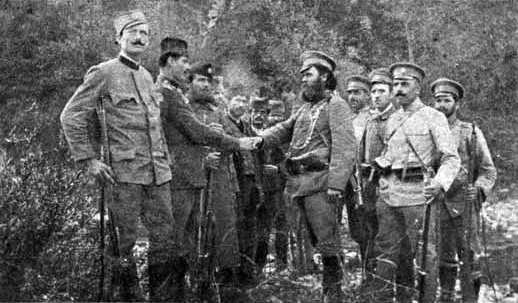
Chetnik commanders surrendering to Bulgarian commander Tane Nikolov after the rebellion.

The uprising erupted on 21 February. 300 Chetniks gathered in the village of Obilić near Leskovac. Those under the leadership of Kosta Vojinović voted in support of an uprising and outvoted Kosta Pećanac by thirteen against two. Pećanac had to support the uprising and lead it in order to retain his reputation. However, they found themselves in the middle of the uprising. Per Bulgarian estimates, there were 5,750–7,800 insurgents, while historians have estimated 300–500 and 4,000. According to historian Marko Attila Hoare, the uprising had 15,000 participants in total, with at least 4,000 armed rebels. The rebellion included the areas of Toplica, Jablanica, Jastrebac, and eastern and central parts of Kopaonik. The rebels liberated Kuršumlija (27 February), Lebane (1 March), Prokuplje (3 March) and Blace (5 March). Having broken out in the Toplica region, the rebellion expanded into territories on the right bank of the West Morava (Vlasotince, Crna Trava, Vranje area), and in the West Morava valley, including the Sokobanja and Svrljig areas. The rebels established civilian organs of government in the liberated areas such as municipalities, courts, hospitals and post offices, but without central authority.

In early March, Colonel Aleksandar Protogerov became the chief of the Morava Area. By 7 March, Bulgarian troops had concentrated around 15 battalions with 22 machine guns and 28 cannons. In their attack on 8 March, Bulgarians used around 5 battalions, with strong artillery and air support, while Albanian detachments also took part. The Austro-Hungarian supreme command allocated two battalions of the 102nd Infantry Regiment together with a hill battery from the Socha front, the 3rd border battalion and a gendarmerie battalion from Bosnia. Around 30,000 men of the occupiers' armies have been estimated, of whom 25,000 to 26,000 were involved in operations. On 10 March, Protogerov issued an ultimatum to the rebels to surrender within five days, or otherwise they would be executed, their homes burnt down and their families deported. None of the rebels surrendered. Internal Macedonian-Adrianople Revolutionary Organization (IMARO) detachments led by Tane Nikolov participated in the fight against the rebels. The Austro-Hungarian attack started on 12 March from the Dubci-Zlatari sector. Per military reports on 14 March, an Austro-Hungarian detachment of around 630 men, which had been reinforced with 2 cannons and around 170 men, ended up having 2 officers and 50 soldiers killed, 16 wounded, 126 missing and 22 ill soldiers. Their supply train consisting of 20 men, 1 doctor and 20 horses was captured by rebels. On 18 March, the German consul reported that one Austro-Hungarian officer and 53 soldiers were killed, while 120 went missing. After several days of fighting, the Bulgarians entered Prokuplje on 14 March, and the Austro-Hungarians entered Kuršumlija on 16 March. On 25 March, the order there was fully restored. IMARO commander and Bulgarian officer Todor Aleksandrov participated in the uprising's violent suppression.

Around 20,000 civilians were killed as a result of the uprising. The Bulgarian troops burned and destroyed the village of Gajtan, massacring 200 people, mostly women and children. In the village of Barje, they burned 42 people to death in a house, including a woman and 10 children. Mass rape also took place. More than 80,000 people were deported. IMARO detachments also committed atrocities such as killing, pillaging and raping. The Military General Governorate of Serbia executed around 600 rebels and civilians suspected of giving the rebels support. Rebels also targeted Serbs who had worked for the occupiers and had material benefits.

== Aftermath and legacy ==
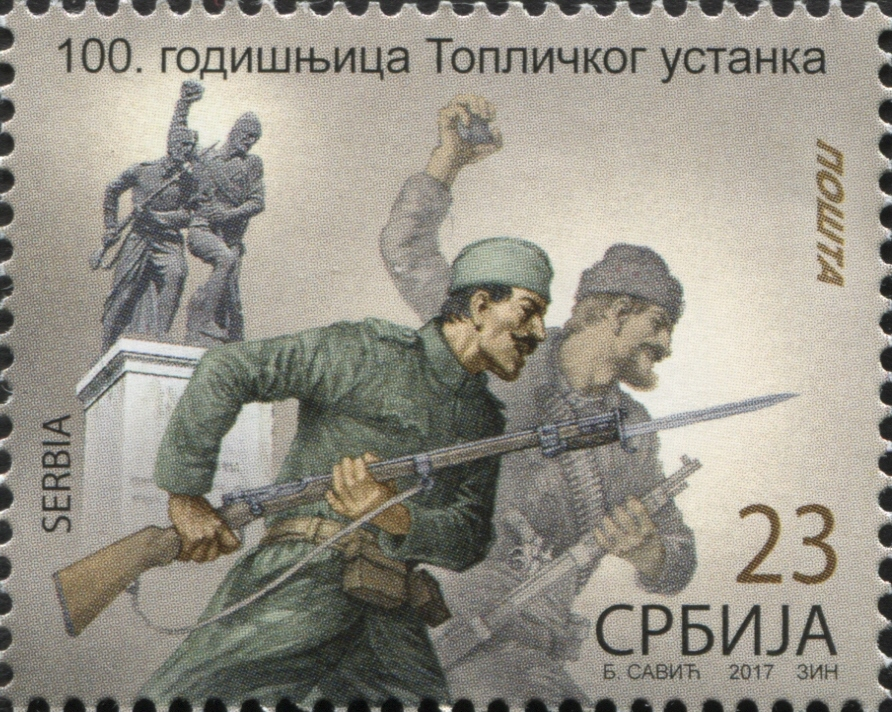
Toplica Uprising 2017 post stamp of Serbia

Atrocities continued even after the defeat of the rebels under Protogerov's replacement Colonel Tasev and the chief of staff Lieutenant Colonel Darvingov (chosen by Protogerov). Even after the uprising's suppression, insurgency remained an issue for the occupiers, thus both the Bulgarians and the Austro-Hungarians developed anti-insurgency strategies. The Austro-Hungarians targeted the rebels with paramilitary tactics.

In April 1917, Pećanac, with his guerrillas, attacked a railway station. On 15 May, Pećanac entered the old Bulgarian border and invaded Bosilegrad, which was burned. Then his band withdrew to Kosovo, controlled by the Austro-Hungarians. The Allies opened a new front at Salonika in June, but the Serbian army could not break through the Bulgarian lines. After reemerging briefly, in September – October 1917, Pećanac again disappeared. In October 1917, the Austro-Hungarian command created entirely Albanian paramilitary detachments to assist the Bulgarian and Austro-Hungarian forces and capture the remaining Serbian rebels in the mountains. On 23 December 1917, surrounded by enemy forces, per historian Andrej Mitrović, Vojinović took his own life before they could kill him. According to Hoare, Vojinović was killed by the Bulgarians.

The uprising is a notable event in the history of Serbia in World War I. It was the only rebellion in the territories occupied by the armies of the Central Powers. On 9 September 1934, at the center square of Prokuplje, the administrative center of the Toplica District, a monument to all Toplica inhabitants who had died in previous wars was erected. The event was attended by Pećanac, Serbian patriarch Varnava and Yugoslav king Alexander, as well as around 40,000 people.

== See also ==
- Serbian Campaign (World War I)
- Bulgaria during World War I

== Sources ==
- Bartrop, Paul Robert (2024). The Routledge History of the First World War. Routledge. ISBN 978-10-32426-03-7.
- Hoare, Marko Attila (2024). Serbia: A Modern History. Oxford University Press. ISBN 978-01-97769-42-3.
- Marković, Svetozar V. (17 April 1927). "Топлички устанак". Belgrade: Правда. p. 4.
- Milovanović, Kosta, and Božica Mladenović. (1998). Dnevnik Koste Milovanovića Pećanca: od 1916. do 1918. godine. Istorijski Institut SANU.
- Mitrović, Andrej (1987). Ustaničke borbe u Srbiji, 1916–1918. Srpska književna zadruga.
- Mitrović, Andrej (1993). Toplički ustanak: mesto u srpskoj istoriji. SANU.
- Mitrović, Andrej (2007). Serbia's Great War, 1914–1918. Purdue University Press. ISBN 978-1-55753-476-7.
- Mladenović, Božica (1997). "Нови наративни извори о Топличком устанку". Историјски часопис. 42–43. Istorijski institut: 311–317. GGKEY:8N4K5PNPTJC.
- Mladenović, Božica (2006). "The Toplica uprising of 1917: Un-researched subjects and prospects for further research". Baština. 20 (2): 313–322.
- Mladenović, Božica (2007a). "Топлички устанак 1917: особитости и значај у српској историји" (PDF). Братство. XI. Belgrade: Друштво "Свети Сава": 41–46.
- Mladenović, Božica (2007b). Топлички устанак 1917: збирка докумената. Istorijski institut. GGKEY:X5X73Z78UTZ.
- Mladenović, Božica, and Milić J. Milićević. (2011). "Казивања Радоша Николића о Топличком устанку." Мешовита грађа 32: 553–560.
- Mladenović, Božica (2012). "Poljakinja u topličkom ustanku 1917. Godine povodom obeležavanja 95-godišnjice topličkog ustanka". Teme. 3: 1371–1378.
- Pašić, Novica (2007). Kosta Vojinović Kosovac: vojvoda Topličkog ustanka. Udruženje ratnih dobrovoljaca. ISBN 978-86-84083-11-3.
- Perović, Milivoje (1954). Ustanak na jugu Sribije 1917.
- Perović, Milivoje (1988) [1959]. Toplički ustanak. Vojno delo.
- Pešić, N., Turović, D. Ž., Pavlović, P., Miljković, M., Rodić, M., & Folić, M. (2006). Ustanak u Toplici i Jablanici 1917. Udruženje ratnih dobrovoljaca 1912–1918, njihovih potomaka i poštovalaca.
- Pissari, Milovan (2013). "Bulgarian Crimes against Civilians in Occupied Serbia during the First World War" (PDF). Balcanica (44). Institute for Balkan Studies. doi:10.2298/BALC1344357P.
- Stojančević, Vladimir (1988). Srbija i srpski narod za vreme rata i okupacije 1914–1918. godine. Narodni muzej u Leskovcu.
- Tasić, Dmitar (2020). Paramilitarism in the Balkans: The Cases of Yugoslavia, Bulgaria, and Albania, 1917-1924. Oxford University Press. ISBN 978-01-98858-32-4.

1993 monographs in Leskovački zbornik

- Mitrović, Andrej (1993). "Колективна свест" (PDF). Лесковачки зборник. 33.
- Opačić, Petar (1993). "Војнополитичке прилике" (PDF). Лесковачки зборник. 33.
- Zlatić, Jovan (1993). "Диверзантска дејства" (PDF). Лесковачки зборник. 33.
- Rakić, Hranislav (1993). "Четовође и војводе" (PDF). Лесковачки зборник. 33.
- Lilić, Borislava (1993). "Одјек" (PDF). Лесковачки зборник. 33.
- Andrejević, Sevdelin (1993). "Насиља Бугара" (PDF). Лесковачки зборник. 33.
- Đevori, Božidar (1993). "Људске жртве" (PDF). Лесковачки зборник. 33.
- Turović, Dobrosav (1993). "Допринос Јабланице" (PDF). Лесковачки зборник. 33.
- Mladenović, Božica (1993). "Арбанаси и Топлички устанак" (PDF). Лесковачки зборник. 33.
- Stojković, Živan (1993). "Злочини Бугара" (PDF). Лесковачки зборник. 33.
- Bodrožić, Milica (1993). "Осврт на литературу" (PDF). Лесковачки зборник. 33.
- Mladenović, Božica (1993). "Арбанаси и Топлички устанак" (PDF). Лесковачки зборник. 33.

1988 monographs in Leskovački zbornik

- Rakić, Hranislav, ed. (1988). "Топлички устанак 1917" (PDF). Лесковачки зборник. 28: 5–184.
