= Kolasin Valleys (ski resort) =

Ski resort in Montenegro

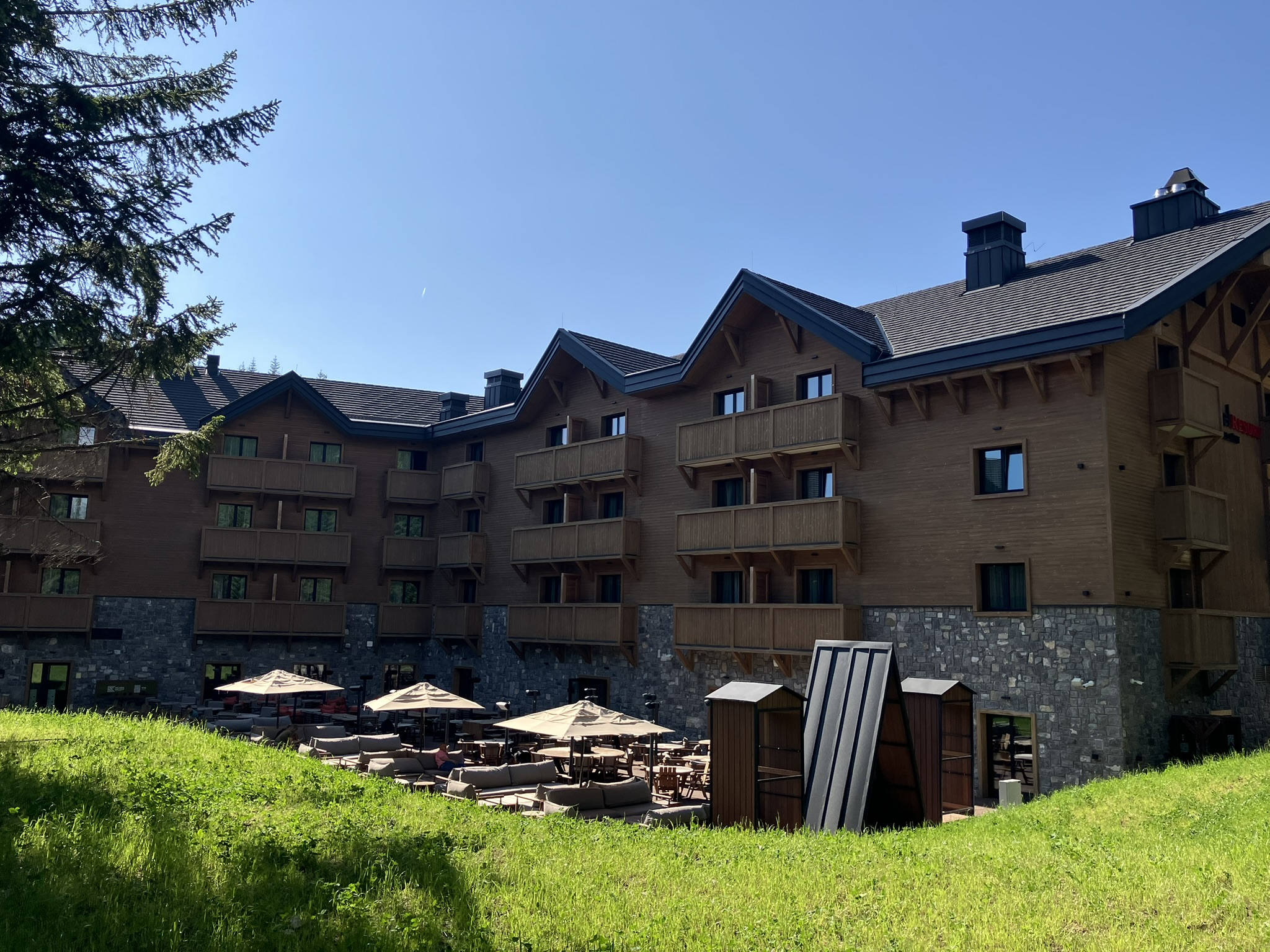
- Interactive map of Kolasin Valleys
- Location: Montenegro
- Mountain: Bjelasica
- Nearest city: Kolasin
- Coordinates: 42.843206°N 19.639529°E
- Opened: January 2024
- Top elevation: 2,075 m (6,808 ft)
- Base elevation: 1,420 m (4,660 ft)
- Skiable area: 50 km
- Lift system: 6 (chairlifts and T-bar lifts)
- Website: https://www.kolasinvalleys.com/en/

Kolasin Valleys (Montenegrin: Колашинске Долине) is a four-season mountain ski resort complex located in the Bjelasica Mountains of northern Montenegro, 9 kilometers from the town of Kolašin. Situated at elevations between 1,420 and 2,075 meters above sea level, the resort is Montenegro's first ski-in/ski-out destination.

The resort opened in 2024 and is structured around two interconnected alpine villages — 1450 Nest and K16 Peak — and encompasses 50 kilometers of ski trails.

== History ==
The resort opened in 1991 under the name Jezerine. It was later renamed Bjelasica, and then Kolašin 1450.

In 2011, the Canadian planning company Ecosign was commissioned to develop a master plan for the Kolasin Valleys resort. Construction began in 2020.

In July 2022, a new highway connecting Podgorica to Kolašin was opened, at a cost of approximately US$1 billion.

In January 2024 Swissôtel Resort Kolašin was opened.

As of 2026, the resort offers 50 kilometers of ski trails serviced by six lifts. Оverall development plan envisages a total of 23 hotels, 73 chalets, and 150 kilometers of ski terrain by 2030.

== Resort concept ==
The lower village 1450 Nest, set at 1,450 meters above sea level, serves as the resort's social and entertainment hub.

K16 Peak, situated at 1,600 meters in the southern portion of the Bjelasica range, is Montenegro's highest ski resort zone. It is designed for family-oriented and wellness-focused recreation.

The two villages are connected by a direct road and the K-7 chairlift.

== Resort Infrastructure ==
The resort's total length is 50 kilometres of tracks across a range of difficulty levels, with the highest point of the ski terrain reaching 2,075 meters. The K-7 chairlift connects the 1,450-metre and 1,600-metre zones.

As of 2026, the resort's operating hotel is the Swissôtel Resort Kolašin, with 116 rooms. The hotel has direct access to the ski slopes and also features underground parking.

The resort is planned to have 23 hotels and 73 chalets.

Tourists also have access to cross-country skiing and designated freeride zones, hiking and horse-riding routes, boating on a mountain lake, observation decks, wellness centers, gyms, cafes and restaurants, nightclubs and bars.

== See also ==
- Kolašin
- Bjelasica Mountains
- Biogradska Gora
- Montenegro
