= Bombardment of Belgrade (1914) =

Opening engagement of World War I

- Part of the Serbian campaign (1914) of World War I
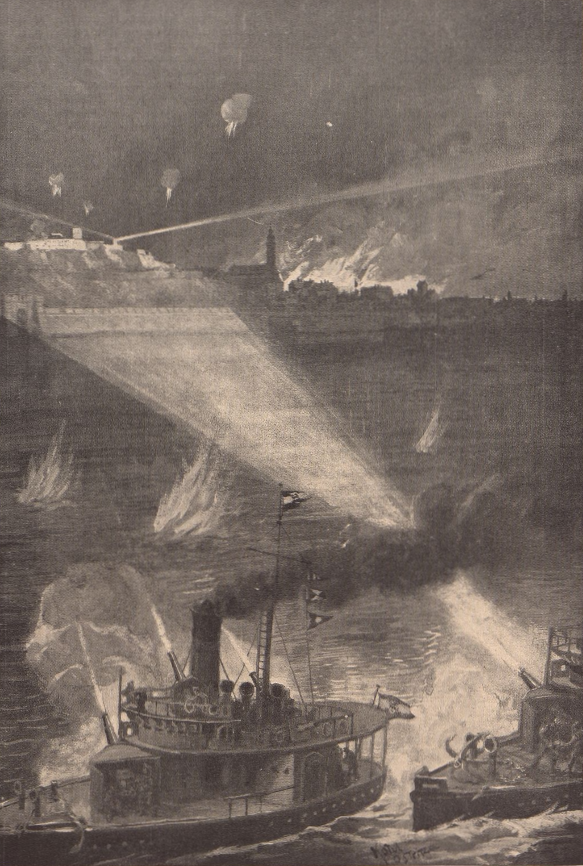
- Shelling of Belgrade in the night of 28 and 29 July 1914 (German illustration, 1914)
| Date | 28–29 July 1914 |
| Location | Belgrade, Kingdom of Serbia 44.82°N 20.46°E |
| Result | Opening of hostilities on the Serbian front |

Belligerents
| Austria-Hungary | Serbia |

Commanders and leaders
| (Austria-Hungary) Colonel Emil von Baumgartner (Austria-Hungary) Fregattenkapitän Friedrich Grund | (Kingdom of Serbia) Major Vojislav Tankosić |

Strength
| Army: 14th Infantry Brigade; Navy: Danube Flotilla; 3 river monitors (SMS Bodrog, SMS Temes, SMS Szamos); Artillery at Zemun and Bežanija | Army: Elements of the 18th Infantry Regiment; Other: Chetnik formations Serbian border guards (≈200 men) |

Casualties and losses
| Several killed or drowned | One reported |
- Civilian casualties: Minimal; limited structural damage in Belgrade

The Bombardment of Belgrade (Serbian Cyrillic: Бомбардовање Београда, German: Der Bombardierung von Belgrad) was an Austro-Hungarian naval and artillery attack on the Serbian capital during the night of 28–29 July 1914, marking the opening engagement of World War I. Carried out by the Austro-Hungarian Danube Flotilla and supporting artillery across the Sava River, it was the first act of hostilities following the declaration of war on Serbia earlier that day.

Shortly after midnight, the river monitor SMS Bodrog fired on the city, joined by SMS Temes and SMS Szamos, in what is widely regarded as the first shot fired in the First World War. News of the bombardment prompted Tsar Nicholas II to order the general mobilisation of the Imperial Russian Army, accelerating the July Crisis into a continental conflict. Within two weeks, the Balkanstreitkräfte launched a full-scale invasion of Serbia, beginning the first land campaign of the war.

== Background ==
Following the Assassination of Archduke Franz Ferdinand on 28 June 1914, the Austrian government, alleging official Serbian involvement, issued an ultimatum which expired on 25 July. Serbia responded within the time limit, but Vienna rejected negotiation, declared the reply unsatisfactory, severed diplomatic relations, and ordered military mobilisation.

== Prelude ==
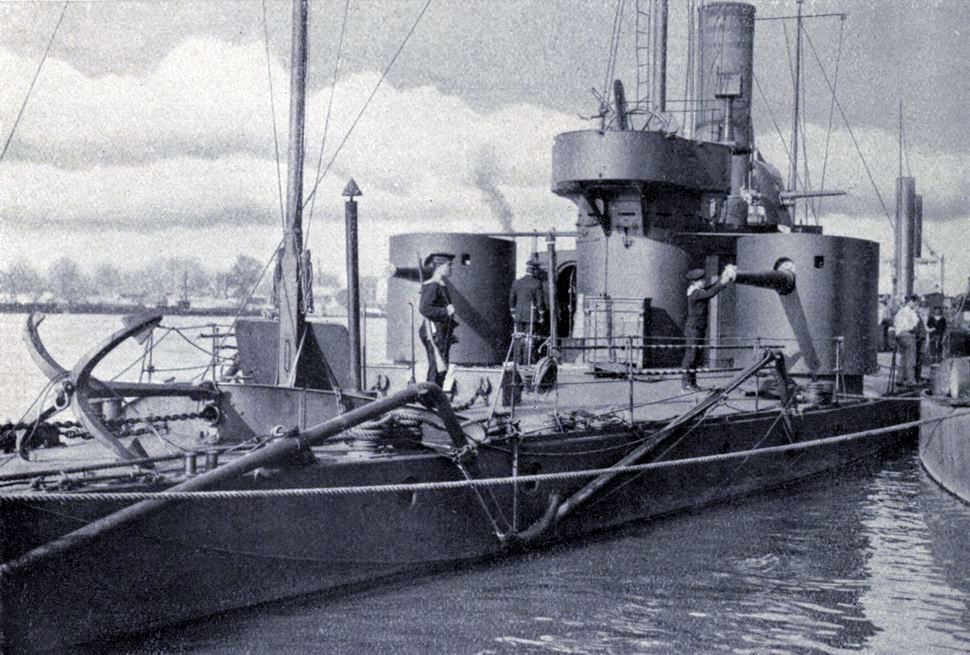
SMS Bodrog, one of the three monitors that bombarded Belgrade.

Belgrade's position at the confluence of the Danube and Sava rivers, directly opposite Austria-Hungary, made it highly vulnerable to bombardment. In mid-July, the Austro-Hungarian Danube Flotilla, based upstream at Semlin, received orders to prepare for combat operations in support of the army. Additional monitors, gunboats, tugs, and patrol craft were deployed along the Danube to support troop crossings.

On 25 July, a royal proclamation ordered mobilisation of the Serbian Army. The response was rapid and efficient, as Serbia had carried out similar call-ups in recent years. The government relocated to Niš and began evacuating Belgrade. The Serbian Danube Division, responsible for defending Belgrade, had not yet deployed to the city's northern approaches; no heavy artillery or machine guns were available to counter a gunboat attack. The capital was defended only by gendarmes, a Chetnik detachment under Vojislav Tankosić, and a company from the 18th Infantry Regiment.

On the afternoon of 28 July, Austria-Hungary's declaration of war was communicated to the High Command and a telegram sent to the Serbian government in Niš. That evening, Colonel Emil von Baumgartner, commander of the 14th Infantry Brigade, convened a meeting where it was decided that three river monitors would depart shortly after midnight to secure the bridges over the Sava between Semlin and Belgrade.

== Bombardment of Belgrade ==
Shortly after midnight on 28–29 July 1914, three Austro-Hungarian tugs carrying infantry and escorted by a river monitor moved towards Donji Grad, the lower fortress of Belgrade. Serbian irregulars opened fire, forcing the vessels to withdraw upriver towards the railway bridge. Anticipating an attempted crossing, a detachment from Tankosić’s Chetnik unit blew up the bridge while the Austro-Hungarian monitors were still manoeuvring.

A few minutes later, two monitors of the Danube Flotilla, SMS Bodrog and SMS Temes, opened fire with their 12-cm guns on Belgrade from positions near the confluence of the Danube and Sava rivers. Contemporary sources record this as the first exchange of fire of the First World War. Modern historians Alexandra Churchill and Nicolai Eberholst note that Bodrog was "credited with firing the first shot of the war, not against enemy troops but into a civilian city", and that the bombardment ceased soon after the monitors came under return fire.

Lacking heavy artillery, the Serbian defenders could not seriously damage the armoured vessels, but exchanged rifle and machine-gun fire from the Belgrade Fortress and Great War Island. The Austro-Hungarians responded with shrapnel and high-explosive shells directed at the fortress, the radio station in Kalemegdan Park, and the neighbourhood of Topčidersko Brdo.

At dawn, Habsburg artillery batteries positioned in Bežanija and Zemun joined in, firing Krupp howitzers and Škoda 305 mm Model 1911 mortars across the Sava. Shells struck several civilian buildings, including a school, banks, and hotels. Although the attack caused relatively light damage and casualties, it continued intermittently over the next eight days, hitting churches, hospitals, and museums in violation of the Hague Convention provisions protecting cultural and medical sites.

== Casualties ==
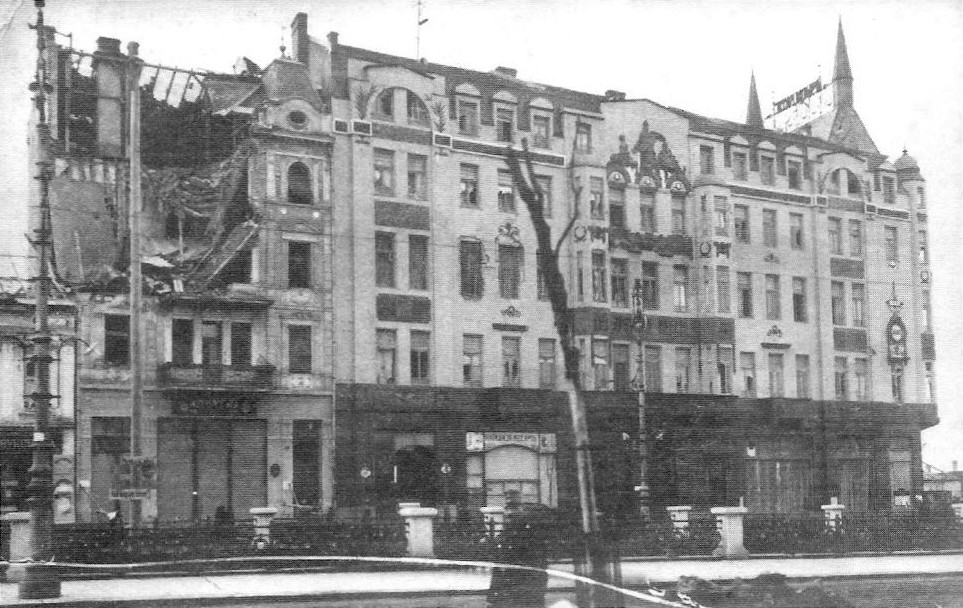
Damage near the Hotel Moskva

Reported Serbian casualties included Dušan Đonović, a student and member of Jovan Babunski’s Chetnik detachment. On the Austro-Hungarian side, Karl Eberling, captain of the lead tug, and his helmsman Mikhail Gemsberger were killed when their vessel ran aground; several soldiers attempting to swim ashore drowned.

== Aftermath ==
On 29 July, the Russian government informed Berlin that it had mobilised four military districts; the following day, general mobilisation was ordered. On 31 July, a "state of imminent war" was declared in the German Empire and two days later on August 2 German forces began their invasion of Western Europe (Luxembourg, Belgium, and France) and also bombarded the then Russian coastal town of Liepāja. This turned the crisis from being potentially a mere "Third Balkan War" into World War I.

Shelling of Serbian border towns and cities continued until mid-August. On 12 August, the Habsburg 5th Army, supported by the 2nd Army, crossed the Drina River from Bosnia, beginning the first Austro-Hungarian invasion of Serbia.
