= Obilić (Bojnik) =

Obilić Обилић
- Village
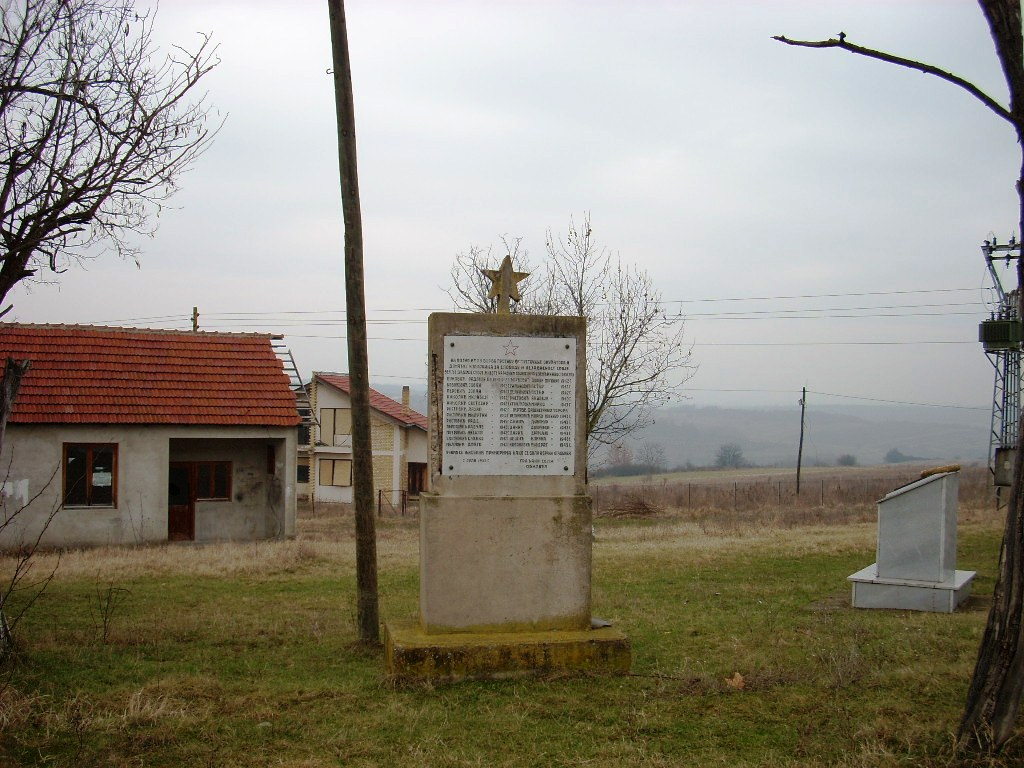
- Monument in Obilić.

- Location in Serbia
- Coordinates: 43°04′34″N 21°45′04″E
- Country: Serbia
- Region: Southern and Eastern Serbia
- District: Jablanica
- Municipality: Bojnik
- Elevation: 883 ft (269 m)

Population (2022)
  - Total: 42
- Time zone: UTC+1 (CET)
  - Summer (DST): UTC+2 (CEST)

Obilić (Serbian Cyrillic: Обилић) is a village in the municipality of Bojnik, Serbia. According to the 2022 census, the village has a population of 42 inhabitants.

== History ==
Serbian guerilla leaders met on 21 February in Obilić and held a two-day long meeting where they decided to launch an uprising in March.

== Population ==
Population of Obilić
1948	1953	1961	1971	1981	1991	2002	2011	2022
255	204	145	153	150	107	94	54	42
