= Veljko Vlahović =

Montenegrin politician and army officer

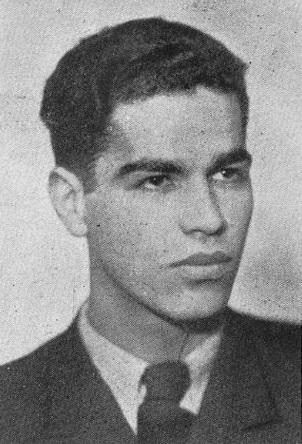
- Vlahović in 1937, during the Spanish Civil War
- Born: Velimir Vlahović; 2 September 1914; Trmanje, Montenegro
- Died: 7 March 1975 (aged 60); Geneva, Switzerland
- Burial place: Belgrade New Cemetery
- Relatives: Milinko Vlahović (father)
- Military career
- Allegiance: International Brigades; Yugoslav Partisans; Yugoslav People's Army
- Service years: 1937–1939; 1941–1955
- Rank: General major
- Conflicts: Spanish Civil War; World War II
- Awards: Order of the Yugoslav Star; Order of the People's Hero; Order of the Hero of Socialist Labour; Order of National Liberation; Order of Lenin; Order of the Flag of the Republic of Hungary; Order of Polonia Restituta

Veljko Vlahović (Cyrillic: Вељко Влаховић; 2 September 1914 – 7 March 1975) was a Montenegrin politician and career army officer. He was one of the prominent members of the Montenegrin branch of the Yugoslav Communist Party from 1935 which established the SFR Yugoslavia following World War II. He studied in Belgrade, Prague, and the Sorbonne (in Paris), and finished his postgraduate studies in Moscow. He fought in the Spanish Civil War and was active in organizing the Communist Youth League of Yugoslavia (SKOJ).

During World War II he directed the Free Yugoslavia radio. In 1944 he became editor of the Yugoslav communist daily, Borba. He also served as deputy Foreign Minister.

Vlahović was essential in organizing the documents for the Programme of the League of Communists of Yugoslavia (Program Saveza komunista Jugoslavije, also known as the Ljubljana Programme, which laid the principles of Titoism) and the 10th Congress of the Party, both in 1958. As such, he kept a great authority alongside Josip Broz Tito as an ideological mastermind.

== See also ==
- Socialist Federal Republic of Yugoslavia
- Titoism
