= Batrić Jovanović =

Politician

Batrić Jovanović (1922 - 2011) was a Montenegrin Serb politician, member of the partisan movement in World War II, and author from Montenegro. He represented Montenegro in the Socialist Federal Republic of Yugoslavia parliament.

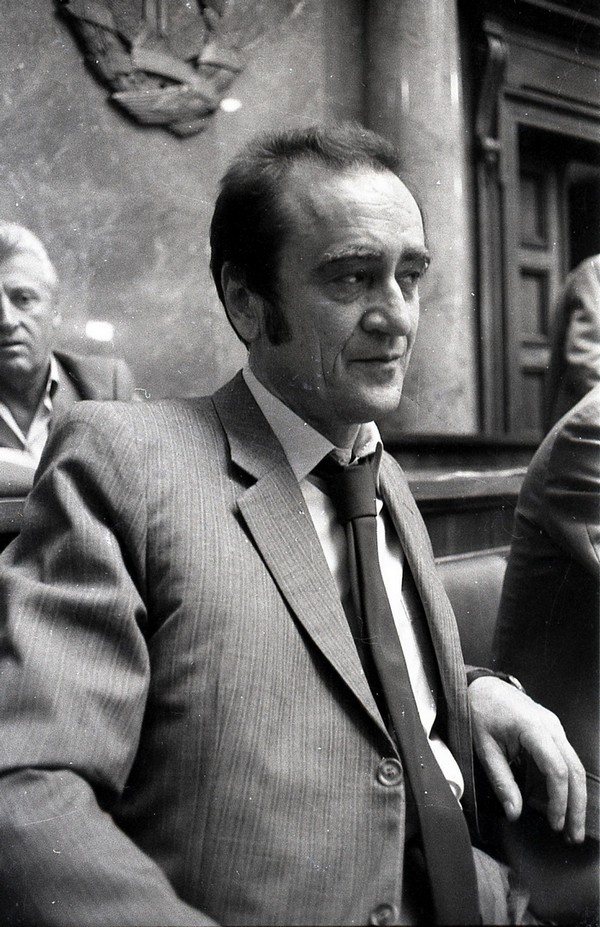
Batrić Jovanović

== Biography ==
Jovanović was born on 3 June 1922 in the village of Donja Morača near Kolašin. He came from a farming family, and his parents were Milovan and Jelisaveta Jovanović. He finished high school in Peć in 1940 and after matriculation he entered the Faculty of Law in Belgrade. During his studies, he joined the student revolutionary movement and soon became a member of the then illegal Communist Party of Yugoslavia (KPJ). He died on 16 February 2011 in Belgrade, Serbia.

== Books ==
- Communist Party of Yugoslavija in Montenegro 1919-1941 1959
- Montenegro in Second World War and Socialist Revolution 1960
- Trinaestojulski ustanak (1984)
- Kolashin region in socialistic revolution (1985)
- Montenegrins about themself (Crnogorci o sebi) (1986)
- Negating serb origins of montenegrins is crime of Tito and Stalin (Rasrbljivanje Crnogoraca: Staljinov i Titov zlocin) 2003
