= Sliven prisoner of war camp =

Bulgarian prisoner-of-war camp

Sliven
- Prisoner-of-war camp
- Coordinates: 42°41′N 26°20′E
- Location: Sliven, Bulgaria
- Operated by: Bulgaria
- Operational: 1915 – 1918
- Inmates: Mainly Serbians, Greeks

Sliven was a Bulgarian prisoner-of-war camp established in Sliven in 1915 with the intent of housing Serbian troops captured during the course of World War I. Over time Greek and Serbian civilians joined their ranks reaching 19,000 at its peak. From 1916 until its dissolution in 1918, the camp served as a punitive institution. Internees suffered from the lack of proper housing conditions, typhus, malnutrition and ill treatment from their guards. This led to the deaths of over 6,000 prisoners.

== Background ==
The 28 June 1914 assassination of Austro-Hungarian heir presumptive Archduke Franz Ferdinand precipitated Austria-Hungary's declaration of war against Serbia. The conflict quickly attracted the involvement of all major European countries, pitting the Central Powers against the Entente coalition and starting World War I. After the entry of the Ottoman Empire into the war on the side of the Central Powers (November 1914), the decisive factor in the Balkans became the attitude of Bulgaria. Bulgaria occupied a strategically important position on the Serbian flank and its intervention on either side of the belligerents would be decisive. Bulgaria and Serbia had fought each continuously in the previous thirty years: following the Serbo-Bulgarian War of 1885 hostilities continued in the form of an undeclared war during the Macedonian Struggle. The area of north-western Macedonia then belonging to the Ottoman Empire became the arena of the ethnic violence between the ethnic Serb population represented by the Serbian Chetnik Organization and ethnic Bulgarians from the Internal Macedonian Revolutionary Organization (IMRO). IMRO also engaged in hostilities with ethnic Greeks and their supporters in the rest of Macedonia.

In 1913, Serbia, Greece, Romania and the Ottoman Empire defeated Bulgaria in the Second Balkan War and the Bulgarian government and people generally felt that Serbia and Greece had stolen land which rightfully belonged to Bulgaria. The preceding waves of tit for tat war crimes committed by both parties, left relations strained. Starting from December 1914, at least 18 articles appeared in Bulgarian newspapers accusing the Serbian army of perpetrating massacres, mass rapes and other crimes towards the Bulgarian populations of Vardar Macedonia. At the same time IMRO stepped up its attacks in Serbian controlled territories. While the Allies could only offer Bulgaria small territorial concessions from Serbia and neutral Greece, the Central Powers' promises appeared far more enticing, as they offered to cede most of the land which Bulgaria claimed. With the Allied defeats at the Battle of Gallipoli (April 1915 to January 1916) and the Russian defeat at Gorlice-Tarnów (May to September 1915) demonstrating the Central Powers' strength, King Ferdinand signed a treaty with Germany and on September 21, 1915, Bulgaria began mobilizing for war.

After the victory of the Serbian army in the Battle of Kolubara in December 1914, the Serbian front saw a lull until the early autumn of 1915. Under the command of Field Marshal August von Mackensen, the Austro-Hungarian Balkan Army, the German 11th Army and river flotillas on the Danube and the Sava began an offensive on 6 October 1915, the largest offensive against Serbia. By September 1915, despite the extreme sacrifice of the Serbian army, the Austro-Hungarian Balkan Army, having crossed the rivers Sava and Drina and the German 11th Army after crossing the Danube, occupied Belgrade, Smederevo, Požarevac and Golubac, creating a wide bridgehead south of the Sava and Danube rivers. This, combined with the successful Bulgarian offensives at Morava, Ovče Pole and Kosovo forced Serbian forces to withdraw to neutral Greece. France and Britain to transferred troops from the Gallipoli Campaign to Greek Macedonia. The Macedonian front was thus established in an effort to support the remnants of the Serbian army to conquer Vardar Macedonia.

On 17 August 1916, in the Struma Offensive Bulgaria invaded Greece, easily conquering all Greek territory east of the Struma, since the Greek Army was ordered not to resist by the pro-German King Constantine. The surrender of territory recently won with difficulty in the Second Balkan War was the last straw for many supporters of Liberal Party politician Eleftherios Venizelos. With Allied assistance, they launched a coup which secured Thessaloniki and most of Greek Macedonia, causing the National Schism. In June 1917, the Venizelists gained full control of the country, immediately declaring war on the Central Powers and joining the Allied Army of the Orient operating on the Balkan Front. The Greek entry into the war along with the 24 division reinforcements that the Army had received in the spring of the same year had created a strategic advantage for the Entente. On 29 September 1918, the Bulgarians were granted the Armistice of Salonica following a decisive defeat in the Vardar Offensive.

During the course of the Balkan Wars Bulgaria had captured a relatively small number of prisoners, therefore their internment was limited to cities. Bulgaria entered the First World War, having no previous experience of running prisoner of war camps. Arrangements were improvised on the spot, causing major logistical issues. A document titled "Regulations for Prisoners of War" was issued on 9 October 1915, it officially endorsed the Hague Conventions of 1899 and 1907. Nevertheless, many regulations were characterized by their ambiguity, thus granting the camp commanders disproportionate power in the decision-making process. While the Plovdiv camp stood next to the Arda river and the weather was mild, the Haskovo lacked a supply of clean water. The reports issued by the camp commanders were filled incorrectly and rarely described humanitarian conditions. Furthermore, inspections to the camps were scarce and irregular. Regulations were overhauled in 1918 when the Bulgarian government acknowledged the existence of disparities between the camps. Yet the lack of an adequate enforcement mechanism and the hardships faced by Bulgaria during that time frame prevented them from being implemented.

== Camp ==
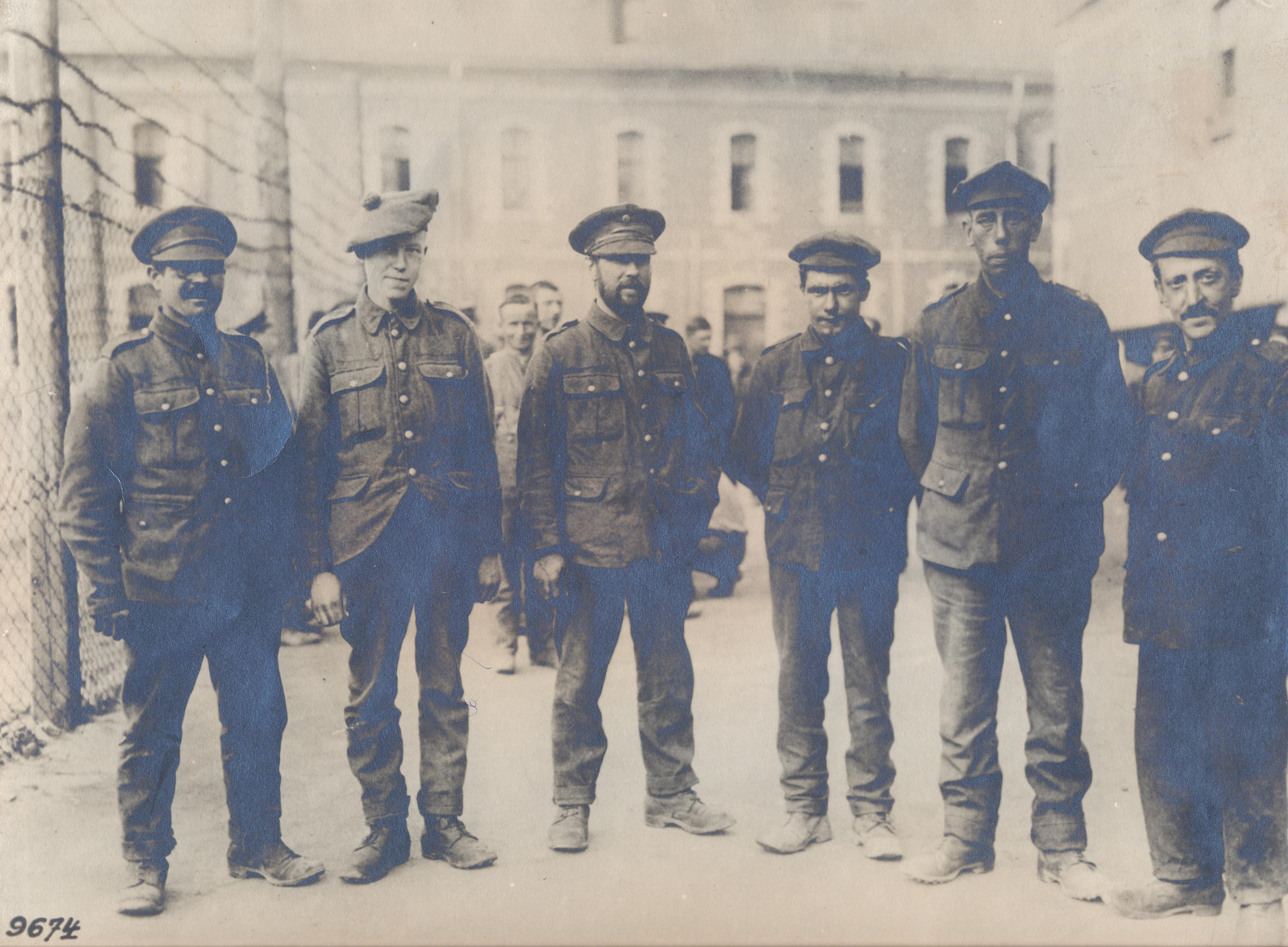
Allied prisoners of war in Bulgaria.

The Sliven prisoner-of-war camp was established in 1915 with the intent of housing captured Serbian troops. Starting from 1916, its population was bolstered with Serbian civilians who were held in mixed groups with the military personnel. At its peak 19,000 prisoners were assigned to Sliven, being the largest Bulgarian administered POW camp. However 1,800 at most resided within the camp, the rest being house near their place of employment. At the same time the camp was transformed into a punitive institution. In July 1917, it began receiving Greek civilians from the occupied Western Thrace region, the Greeks were treated the same way as the Serbs. A parallel influx of Serbian civilians from Morava necessitated the construction of a lesser camp, numbering 28 barracks. Each barrack held 80 to 100 internees while its intended capacity was 20. The prisoners slept on the floor, it did not contain bed, hay or blankets or windows. The faulty construction meant that water often leaked in. The barrack had no toilets and sanitation and disinfection were rare, prisoners still defecated within them as those who attempted to venture outside the barracks during the night were shot or beaten. The prisoners held there were fed 300 to 800 grams of black bread per day, a pepper soup three times per week and meat once per week. The prisoners grew increasingly hungry eating grass and stealing hay from the cattle. The internees were held without clothes, shoes or underwear. On average only 20 people per barrack survived until the end of the war. Between August and December 1917, 2,709 deaths were recorded of them 1,490 were from malnutrition.

In the winter of 1917, the camp was struck by an epidemic of typhus. In January 1918, a quarantine was put in place by the three prisoner of war doctors practicing at the camp. Of the 5,036 prisoner, 1,548 were declared unfit for work, 314 were sick, 2,379 were working outside the camp and 623 were held as regular prisoners. An inspection by major general Mitiev in the same month led to the enactment of a 21-day incubation period in barracks where a sick prisoner was found. From then on the healthy prisoners were separated from the sick by an armed guard. Mitiev's inspection also uncovered the deaths of 99 and 66 prisoners in December 1917 and January 1918 at the camp's Yambol depot. The depot's commander second lieutenant Hristozov had not filled the necessary forms properly and claimed to be oblivious to the cause of the deaths, while having taken no precautionary measures against the epidemic. When threatened with a court-martial Hristozov emphatically dismissed the warning. A post war Inter–Allied War Commission estimated that 4,142 Serbian nationals died in the camp and 2,000 more died while performing hard labor outside its limits. On 21 May 1921, Sliven's local council lamented the condition of the camp's graveyard, which held the remains of Serbian prisoners of war and interned civilians.

== Aftermath ==
The Paris Peace Conference, 1919, separated war crimes into 32 specific classes, forming the basis for the future persecution of war criminals identified in previous national and inter–allied commissions. However the question was subsequently forsaken and the responsibility for the trials fell upon the national courts of the Central Powers. A post war Inter–Allied War Commission investigated allegations levelled against Bulgaria, concluding that Bulgarian occupational authorities in Serbia and Greece had breached every single article of the Hague Conventions of 1899 and 1907. The kingdom of Serbia presented a list of 500 Bulgarians it suspected of war crimes, based on the commission's findings. Bulgaria's official response to the enquiry stated that 3 people were arrested and 2 executed for their involvement in various violations of the rules of war. This was later proved to be false, none of the accused were ever convicted of their crimes.
