= Ignjat Kirhner =

Austro-Hungarian officer (1877–1944)

Ignjat Kirhner (Serbian Cyrillic: Игњат Кирхнер, German: Kirchner; 30 May 1877 – 18 May 1944) was an Austro-Hungarian officer, Serbian World War I volunteer, and Yugoslav brigadier-general. He deserted the Austro-Hungarian Army by the start of World War I and joined the Royal Serbian Army as a guerrilla fighter in the Belgrade area. After the war he rose in the Royal Yugoslav Army to the rank of brigadier-general.

== Early life ==
There are differing accounts on his origin. He has been described as: a Banat Swabian (ethnic German); an ethnic Serb, born in Ruma, Austria-Hungary (now Serbia), who adopted the surname Kirchner from his stepfather who adopted and raised him; an ethnic Serb, born in Klein-Betschkerek, Austria-Hungary (now Becicherecu Mic, Romania), who adopted the surname from his stepfather, whom his mother remarried. Ruma was a town which had a Serb majority and minorities of Germans, Hungarians and Croats, while Klein-Betschkerek was a village which had a German majority and minorities of Serbs and Romanians.

He grew up speaking German, and only learnt Serbian while serving in the Austro-Hungarian army.

== Austro-Hungarian service ==
Kirhner finished the Military Academy in Vienna, then served in the Austro-Hungarian army as an officer in Vinkovci in the Kingdom of Croatia-Slavonia (now Croatia) for seven years. Here, he learnt Serbian; it is said that he learnt to speak fluently, but with a likable German accent.

He deserted from the Austro-Hungarian army in 1914 and crossed into the Kingdom of Serbia. According to unconfirmed stories of his comrades, he had deserted after killing a superior officer who, knowing of Kirhner's ancestry or not, had talked very insulting and degrading about Serbs.

== World War I ==
Kirhner joined the Serbian Army, being accepted by decree by King Peter I of Serbia. According to unreliable stories, Kirhner fled to Serbia swimming across the Sava river to Belgrade in the summer of 1914, and was the first to bring news that the Austro-Hungarian government was ready to declare war regardless of the response to the July Ultimatum.

Kirhner began his service in the World War I campaign as a Chetnik volunteer. In 1914 he participated in the capture of an Austro-Hungarian military post on the left shore of the Sava, during which he was wounded in the right foot, but declined to go to hospital. He gathered youngsters from Syrmia and Banat who had managed to escape to Belgrade and wanted to join the Serbian Army, but as they were too young, they joined as volunteers. At first, his volunteer unit numbered 15, but quickly rose up to 400.

During the defense of Belgrade in fall 1915, Kirhner commanded the Srem Volunteer Detachment. In late September, when the state in Belgrade was critical, he led his unit which defended the railway embankment from the "Zlatni šaran" kafana to Knez Mihailova Venac from the incoming Austro-Hungarians. The volunteers suffered great losses. The detachment participated in the assault led by major Dragutin Gavrilović on 7 October. Kirhner was seriously wounded in the same foot, and was saved by his comrades who took him away from the first line of defense. The command of the detachment was taken over by Živko J. Kezić. The detachment was ordered to retreat to the heights south of Belgrade, which was the beginning of the large and organized departure of the army towards southern Serbia, Kosovo, Montenegro and Albania.

Kirhner was treated in Niš, and was with other wounded transferred to Corfu. His nurse was Bosiljka "Bosa" Čajkanović, the sister of reserve captain Veselin Čajkanović, the later academic. During the retreat to Corfu, Kirhner and Bosiljka fell in love, and they later married. From Corfu, he was sent to treatment in Toulouse. There he was healed, but his two woundings in the same foot left him disabled with a 6 cm shorter foot. He finished electro-technical faculty in France.

He was described as a 'great Serbian patriot'. As a Chetnik commander, he received the title of vojvoda.

== Interwar period ==
After the war, he held high offices in the Military-Technical and Engineering Department of the Army and Navy. He married Bosiljka, his war-time love. In the Yugoslav Army, Ignjat Kirhner had the rank of an engineering technical lieutenant, then rose to the rank of brigadier-general (1939). For a period of time, he was the President of the "Association of Belgrade Defenders 1914–1915".

== Last years ==
At his personal request, he was retired shortly before World War II. He declined an offer from Nazi Germany to be employed in the occupation government in Serbia in 1941. He was killed on Easter 1944 in Belgrade during Allied bombardments.

== Sources ==
Books

- Aleksić-Pejković, Ljiljana (1985). Колубарска битка: ратни напори Србије 1914. године. Историјски институт. pp. 69–70.
- Ćurić, Antonije (1985). Za čast otadžbine: kako se Beograd borio u prvom svetskom ratu. NIRO "Književne novine". pp. 27, 64, 131.
- Ivančević, Dušan (1970). Beogradska tvrđava i njene svetinje. Pravoslavlje-novinsko izdavačka ustanova Srpske patrijaršije.
- Grupa autora (1931). Agonija Beograda u svetskom ratu. Štamparija "Jedinstvo". pp. 111, 143, 169.

Web

- "На страни Срба". Novosti. 2006. Archived from the original on June 6, 2019.
- Giljen, Nikola; Mandić, Jelena (29 April 2013) [unknown]. "Сремски добровољачки одред – заборављени јунаци са Дунавског кеја" (Reprint). Originally published in the journal "Istorija". Magacin. Archived from the original on 6 February 2017.
- Giljen, Nikola; Mandić, Jelena (11 May 2013). "Сремски добровољачки одред – заборављени јунаци са Дунавског кеја". Srpsko Blago. Archived from the original on 10 March 2014.
- Petrović, Ilija (14 March 2014). "Сремски добровољачки одред у одбрани Београда" (Mišljenja (Opinion piece)). Vaseljenska. Archived from the original on 7 February 2017.
