= Dragan Lakićević =

Serbian writer (born 1954)

- Born: 5 August 1954 (age 72); Kolašin, SFR Yugoslavia
- Education: University of Belgrade Faculty of Philology
- Occupations: Writer, poet, editor

Dragan Lakićević (Serbian Cyrillic: Драган Лакићевић; born 5 August 1954) is a Serbian poet, storyteller, novelist, translator and editor of literature. Lakićević's work has been translated into Russian, Greek, English, German, Swedish, Dutch, Polish, Italian, Belarusian, Romanian and Armenian. He has lived in Belgrade since 1972.

== Early life ==
Born on 5 August 1954 in Kolašin, Yugoslavia, he attended primary school in Kolašin from 1960 to 1967 and secondary school in Titograd (present-day Podgorica) from 1968 to 1972. He graduated from the University of Belgrade Faculty of Philology, Department of Yugoslav and World Literature, in 1978.

== Career ==
He worked in publishing as an editor of the publishing company Rad in Belgrade from 1979 and went on to become the editor-in-chief from 1986 to 1992. He was an editor of Srpska književna zadruga from 1992 and has been the editor-in-chief since 2009. He also took part in the publishing activities and projects of publishers Bookland, Partenon, and Dereta.

=== Publishing for magazines ===
Lakićević was the editor of literary magazines Raskovnik and Književna kritika, as well as of the children's Orthodox newspaper "Svetosavsko zvonce”. His poems were first published in 1970 in “Male novine” from Sarajevo and “Politika za decu” from Belgrade, and first books of poetry were published in 1976: “Između nas zima” (“Between Us the Winter”) by Matica srpska (Novi Sad) and “Drugo lice” (“Another Face”) by Književna omladina Srbije (Belgrade). His diary from the war time, "Letters from Homeland" was published in Serbian-Swedish magazin "Dijaspora", at the year 1999.

=== Editorial work ===
He has edited and compiled numerous books, publications and editions including the anthology “Srpska književnost za decu” (“Serbian literature for children”) in nearly 100 volumes published by Bookland, Belgrade, 1995–2010. In addition to this he has compiled further anthologies of Serbian and world fairy tales and Serbian children's poetry.

=== Awards ===
He has received a number of awards for his literary work: "Smeli cvet" (Savez Omladine Srbije), “Orden Zlatni jež”, "Politikin Zabavnik" literary award, “Zmaj Ognjeni Vuk”, “Kočićevo pero”, “Deretina knjiga godine”, “Vukova nagrada”, “Pečat varoši sremsko-karlovačke”, Gračanička povelja, Odzivi Filipu Višnjiću ...

== Selected works ==
=== Books of poems ===
- Između nas zima (“Between Us the Winter”)
- Drugo lice (“Another face”)
- Istorija bolesti (“The History of Illness”)
- Sveće na snegu (“Candles In the Snow”)
- Sneg pada dušo (“Snow Is Falling, My Dear")

=== Longer poems ===
- Porodični album (“The Family Album”)
- Porodični azbučnik (“The Family Alphabet”).

=== Novels ===
- Studengrad (“The Frozentown”)
- Zemaljski ključ (“The Earthly key”)
- Četni đavo (“The Company Devil”)
- Mastermajnd (“Mastermind”)
- Sabor poginulih (“Sabor poginulih”)
- Ljubavna knjižica (“The Love Book”)

=== Books of short stories ===
- Guslar na harmonici (“Guslar on the Accordion”)
- Ludački rukpis (“Crazy Manuscript”)
- Štap Svetog Save - legende (“The Staff of St Sava - the legends”)
- Kosovske legende (“The Legends of Kosovo”)
- Štap patrijarha Pavla - legende (“The Staff of Patriarch Pavle - the legends”)
- Slatka je muzika (“Music is sweet”)

=== Children’s books ===
- Bajka o jabuci (“The Tale Of the Apple”)
- Mač Kneza Stefana (“The Sword of Prince Stefan”)
- Princeza i lav (“The Princess and the lion")
- Beogradska princeza (“The Belgrade Princess”)
- Goca je nešto lepo (“Goca Is Something Nice”)
- Laki
- Robin Hud iz Topčiderske šume (“Robin Hood from the Topcider forest”)
- Vitez viline gore ("The knight from elf' forest")
- The return of Peter Pan

=== Anthologies ===
- Srpske narodne bajke (“Serbian Folk Tales”)
- Srpske junačke pesme (“ Serbian Epic Poems”)
- Antologija srpske poezije za decu (“Anthology of Serbian Poetry for Children”)
- Čarobna knjiga - svetske price za decu (“The Magic Books - the World Stories for Children”), *“Antologija svetskih priča za decu” (“The World Anthology of Stories for Children”)
- San o jabuci – svetske ljubavne priče (“The dream of an Apple - the World Love Stories”)
- San o plavoj svetlosti – svetske ljubavne priče (“The Dream of the Blue Light - the World Love Stories”)
- Žar ptica, bajke naroda sveta ("Fairy-tales from nations of the world")
