= Kosta Vojinović =

Serbian soldier

Vojvoda Kosta Vojinović Kosovac
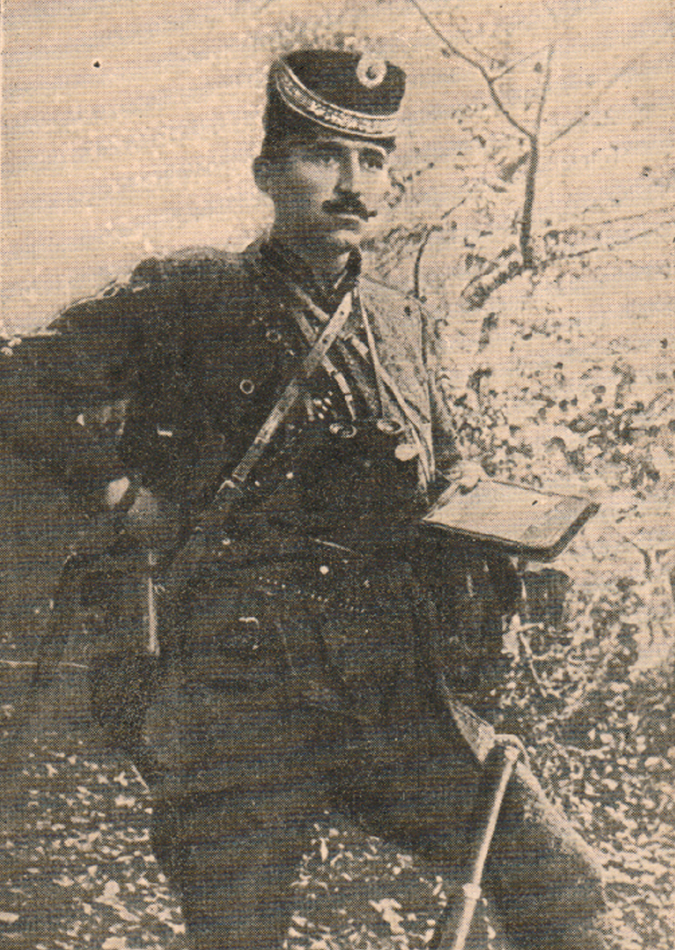
- Kosta Vojinović in Chetnik gear.
- Born: May 13, 1891; Smederevo, Kingdom of Serbia
- Died: December 23, 1917 (aged 26); Grgure, Kingdom of Serbia
- Relatives: Jovan Vojinović (father)
- Military career
- Allegiance: Kingdom of Serbia
- Service years: 1912–17
- Rank: sublieutenant (1915); vojvoda (1917)
- Nickname: Kosovac
- Units: Jadar Detachment (1912–14); Reserve (1914–15); Volunteer Detachment (1915–17)

Kosta Vojinović (Serbian Cyrillic: Коста Војиновић, 13 May 1891 – 23 December 1917), known by his nickname Kosovac (Косовац), was a Serbian soldier who fought in the Balkan Wars and World War I, most notably as a leader of the Toplica Uprising.

== Life ==
Vojinović was born in Smederevo, Kingdom of Serbia, to parents who had fled from the Vučitrn area in Kosovo, due to Albanian zulum (exploitation, oppression, wrongdoing), the region at the time being part of the Ottoman Empire. He came from a respected family, his father Jovan having finished military school in Russia and upon returning to Serbia he worked as a state clerk of the general tax administration, and later was the president of a municipality in Kosovska Mitrovica up until World War I. His mother Sofija died while he was young, and he never accepted his step-mother, he thus mostly lived with his mother's family, mostly at his uncle Panta Grujić, a high-ranking Serbian army officer (who was a commander of the Morava Division in World War I, given many awards and rank of general). He had heard stories of Serbian history and wars from his father and uncle while growing up.

He began primary school in Smederevo, continuing in Belgrade until the sixth grade of the gymnasium when his father's employment at an Austrian firm in Belgrade made it possible for Kosta to continue his education in the Vienna University of Business. With an economics degree and flawless German, he returned to Serbia, to Vranje, where his father worked at the time. Kosta established a commercial business with his brother-in-law Dušan Kalčić.

In Vranje, he befriended numerous Serb guerillas who had their base in the town. From there, the guerillas crossed the Serbian-Ottoman border into Macedonia where they fought for the liberation of the Serb people. The Central Board of the Serbian Chetnik Organization in Vranje was active at that time, which led to affairs regarding Macedonia, and thereby Chetnik armed action. Some of the most notable fighters active at the time included Jovan Babunski, Jovan Dovezenski, Vasilije Trbić, Pavle Mladenović, Vojislav Tankosić, Savatije Milošević, Doksim Mihailović, Đorđe Skopljanče, Vojin Popović, and others. His day-to-day traveling work gave him time to undetectably enter Serb villages and contact Chetniks from whom he received information on battles and successes. His career ended in 1911 when he was called for military training.

The First Balkan War broke out in October 1912, in which he participated as an ordinary soldier, passing from Kumanovo to Bitola. After the end of the war and liberation of Serb territories, he returned to his business, but was stopped by Austro-Hungarian threats and World War I. He immediately volunteered and joined the Jadar Detachment, commanded by veteran Vojin Popović (known as "Vojvoda Vuk"). He participated at the great victory at Kolubara, and for his bravery and able military conduct he was elevated to reserve sublieutenant of the Serbian Army. In September 1915, when the Central Powers with full force broke down Serbia, wearied by previous battles and epidemic typhus fever, Kosta Vojinović found himself in the renewed detachment of Vojvoda Vuk which was forwarded to the Čemernik mountain towards Bulgaria, to provide security for the Serbian Armies. While fighting battles there, he was wounded but did not leave the battlefield, the detachment retreated to villages around Vučitrn. There, he was taken in and promised (besa) by Albanian Ali Šalja, who illegally transferred him to his father, who had up until the occupation worked as a president of the municipality of Kosovska Mitrovica.

== Toplica Uprising ==
Toplica Uprising is the only national uprising against the occupying forces in World War I, led by the Chetniks under the leadership of Kosta Vojinović and Kosta Pećanac. The rebellion started in 1917 against the Bulgarians who imposed terror on the Serbian population. The Serbian General Headquarters sent help, but the Bulgarians were faster and engaged large forces to break the uprising. Twenty thousand people were killed and 100.000 were taken prisoners to the Bulgarian camps. Despite that, the uprising was not suppressed.

== Sources ==
- Pešić, Novica (2014-05-02). "Бег од зулума Арнаута". Novosti.
- Pešić, Novica (2014-05-04). "Комите разбиле жандарме". Novosti.
- Pešić, Novica (2014-05-13). "У краљу траже спасиоца". Novosti.
