= Ćukovac (disambiguation) =

Ćukovac is a Serbo-Croatian toponym that may refer to:

- Ćukovac, an urban neighborhood of Belgrade, the capital of Serbia
- Ćukovac, Bojnik, a village in the Bojnik municipality of Jablanica District
- Ćukovac, Prokuplje, a village in the Prokuplje municipality of Toplica District
- Ćukovac, Vranje, a village in the Vranje municipality of Pčinja District
- Ćukovac, Kneževo, a village in Kneževo municipality of Republika Srpska
