= Bojnik =

Bojnik may refer to:

- Bojnik, Serbia, a village and municipality near Leskovac
- Bojnik Air Base, an airfield in Serbia
- Bojnik, Sarajevo, a village in Bosnia and Herzegovina
- Bojnik, one of the Croatian military ranks
