= Savinac =

Savinac (Serbian: Савинац) is a Serbian toponym. It may refer to:

- Savinac, Belgrade, an urban neighbourhood in Serbia
- Savinac (Bojnik), a village in Serbia
- Savinac (Boljevac), a village in Serbia
- Savinac (Gornji Milanovac), a village in Serbia
- Savinac (archaeological site), in Visibaba, Serbia
