= Gornje Konjuvce =

Gornje Konjuvce Горње Коњувце (Serbian)
- Village
- Location within Serbia
- Coordinates: 43°03′15″N 21°40′54″E
- Country: Serbia
- District: Jablanica District
- Municipality: Bojnik

Population (2002)
  - Total: 172
- Time zone: UTC+1 (CET)
  - Summer (DST): UTC+2 (CEST)

Gornje Konjuvce (Serbian Cyrillic: Горње Коњувце) is a village in the municipality of Bojnik, Serbia. According to the 2002 census, the village has a population of 172 people.
