= Vujanovo =

Vujanovo Вујаново (Serbian)
- Village
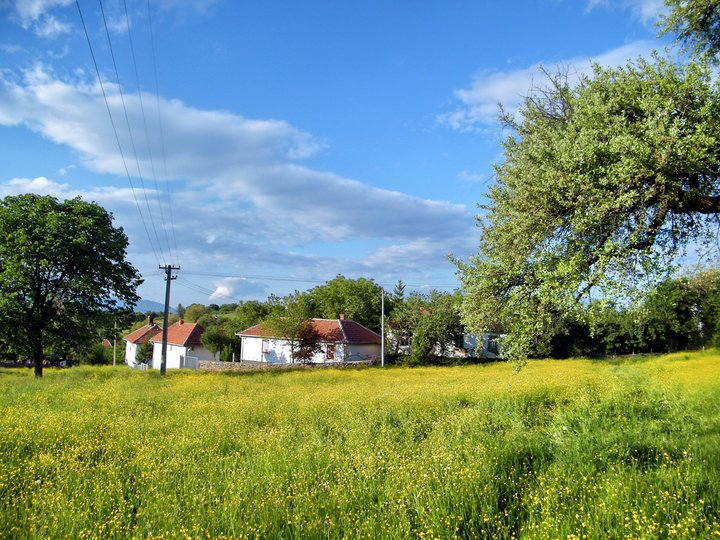

- Location within Serbia
- Coordinates: 43°00′17″N 21°37′14″E
- Country: Serbia
- District: Jablanica District
- Municipality: Bojnik

Population (2002)
  - Total: 64
- Time zone: UTC+1 (CET)
  - Summer (DST): UTC+2 (CEST)

Vujanovo (Serbian Cyrillic: Вујаново) is a village in the municipality of Bojnik, Serbia. According to the 2002 census, the village has a population of 64 people.
