= Mijajlica =

- Village
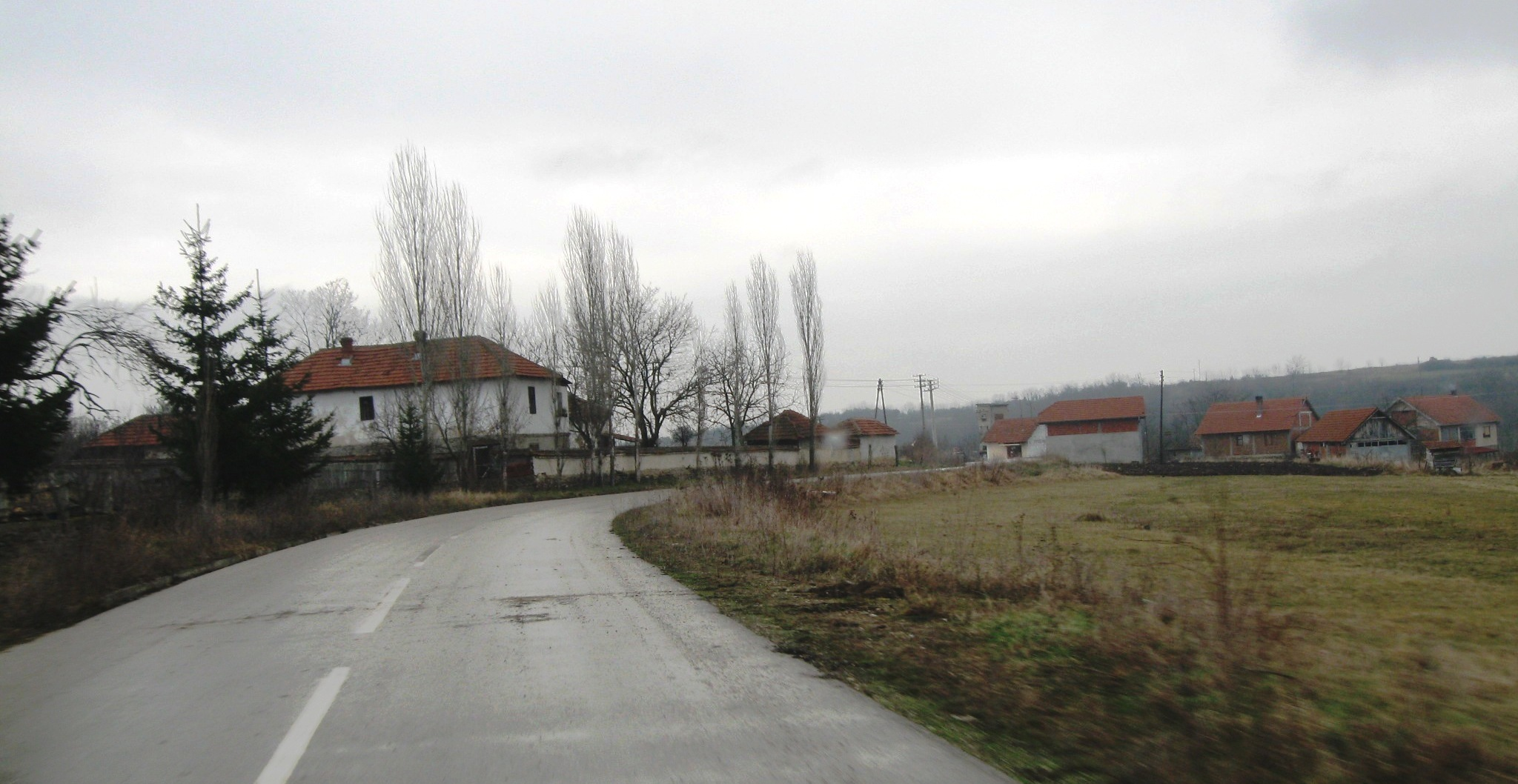

- Location within Serbia
- Coordinates: 42°58′07″N 21°39′12″E
- Country: Serbia
- District: Jablanica District
- Municipality: Bojnik

Population (2002)
  - Total: 190
- Time zone: UTC+1 (CET)
  - Summer (DST): UTC+2 (CEST)

Mijajlica (Serbian Cyrillic: Мијајлица) is a village in the municipality of Bojnik, Serbia. According to the 2002 census, the village has a population of 190 people.
