= Kamenica, Bojnik =

Kamenica Каменица (Serbian)
- Village
- Location within Serbia
- Coordinates: 42°59′49″N 21°42′28″E
- Country: Serbia
- District: Jablanica District
- Municipality: Bojnik

Population (2002)
  - Total: 276
- Time zone: UTC+1 (CET)
  - Summer (DST): UTC+2 (CEST)

Kamenica (Serbian Cyrillic: Каменица) is a village in the municipality of Bojnik, Serbia. According to the 2002 census, the village has a population of 276 people.
