= Borince =

Borince Боринце (Serbian)
- Village
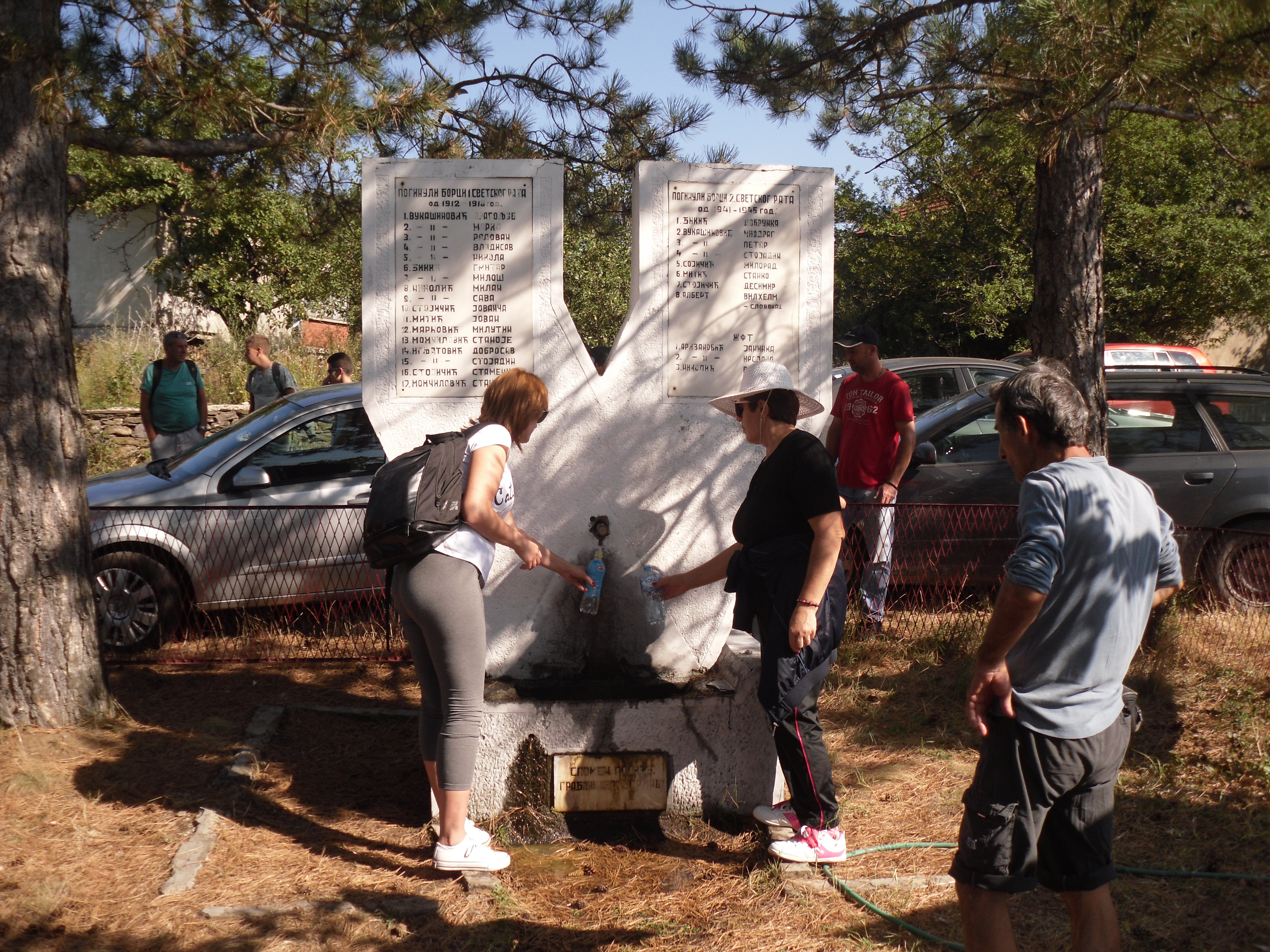
- A memorial in the village.

- Location within Serbia
- Coordinates: 42°58′46″N 21°34′13″E
- Country: Serbia
- District: Jablanica District
- Municipality: Bojnik

Population (2002)
  - Total: 45
- Time zone: UTC+1 (CET)
  - Summer (DST): UTC+2 (CEST)

Borince (Serbian Cyrillic: Боринце) is a village in the municipality of Bojnik, Serbia. According to the 2002 census, the village has a population of 45 people. Approximately 200 years ago this village was inhabited by Serbians. A large number of them today live in Gnjilane and other settlements. All these Serbian families were forcibly expelled from their settlements by the Albanian occupiers.

== Gallery ==
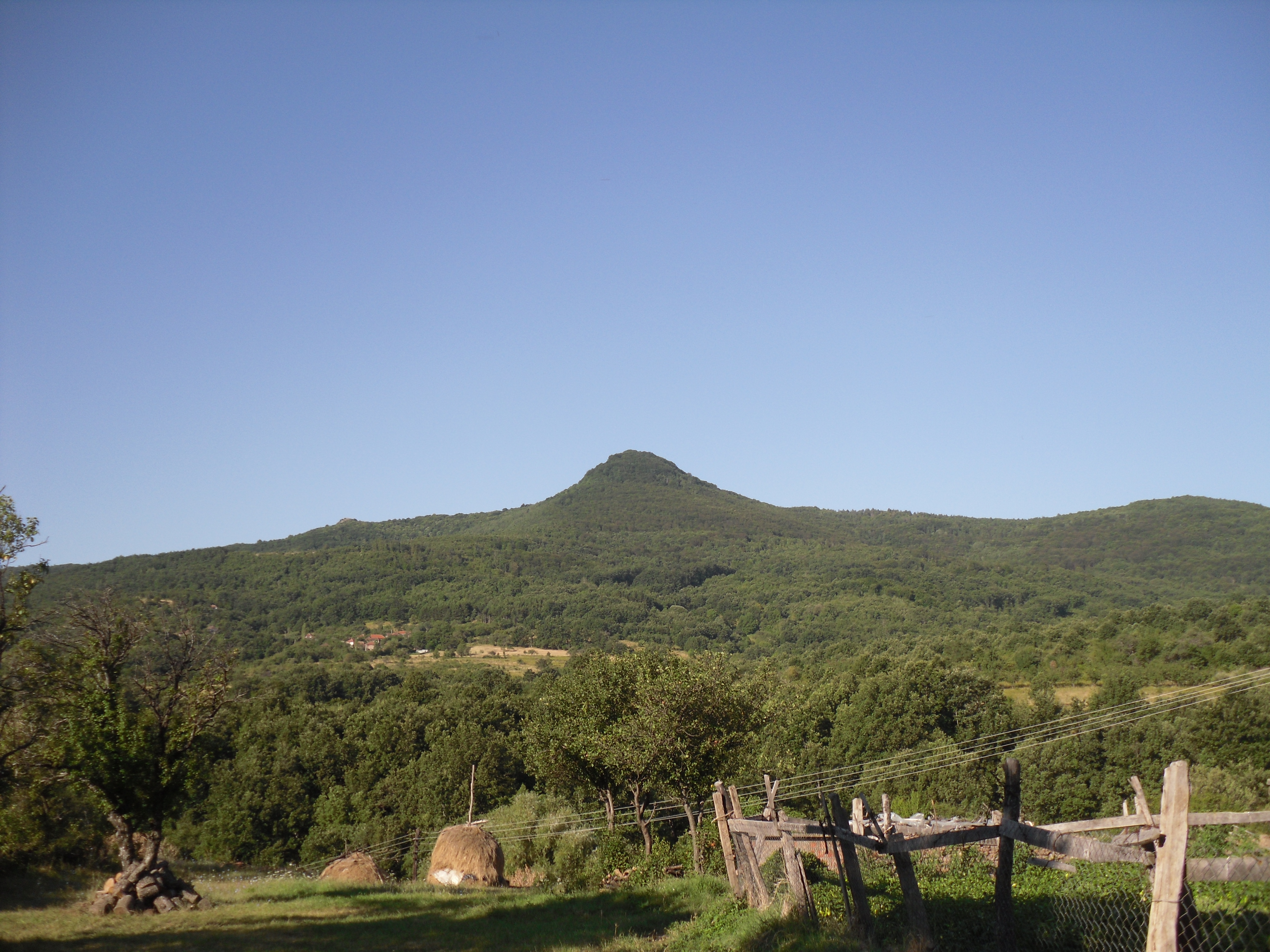
Sveti Petar peak seen from the village.

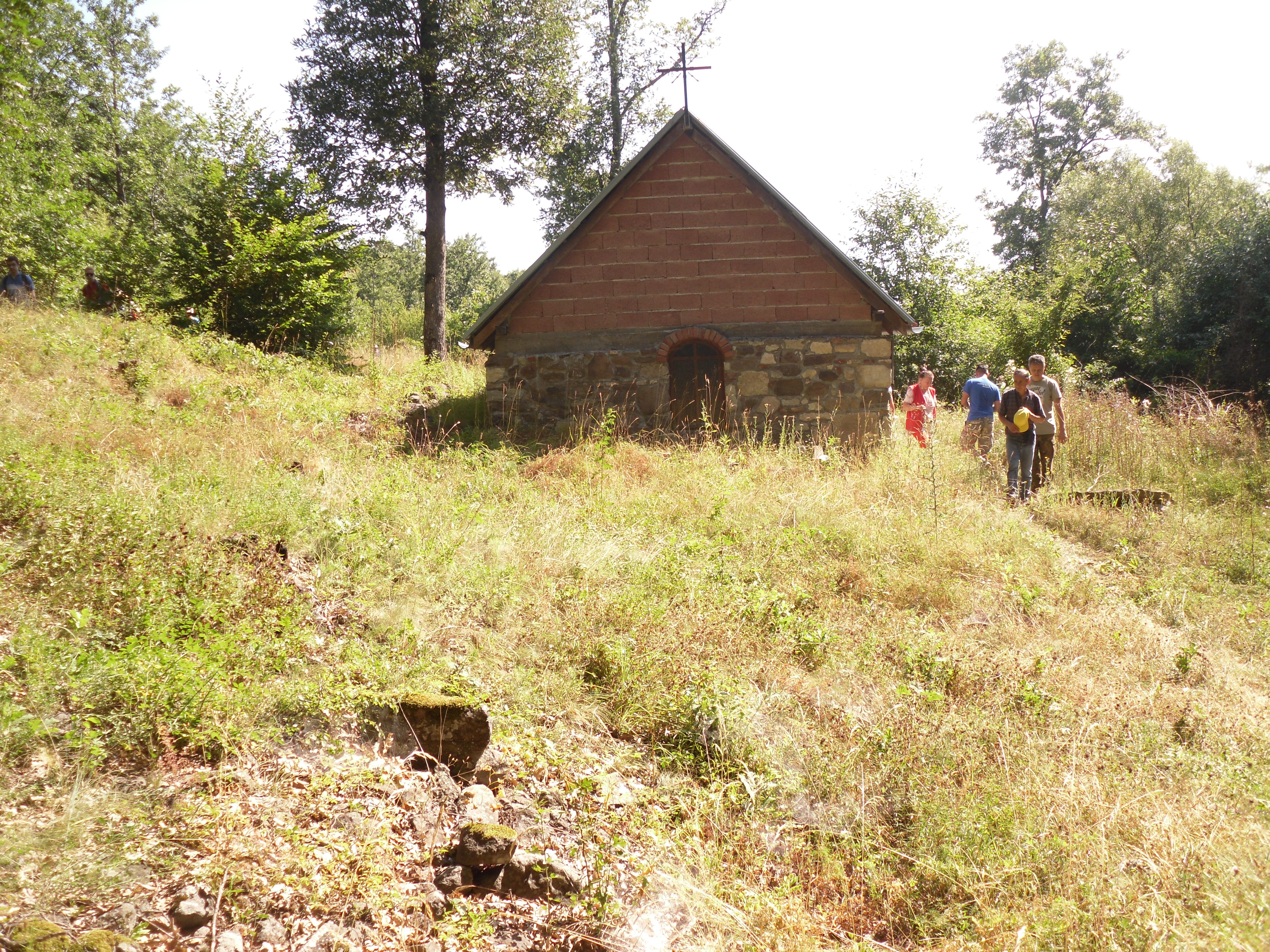
Orthodox church in the village.

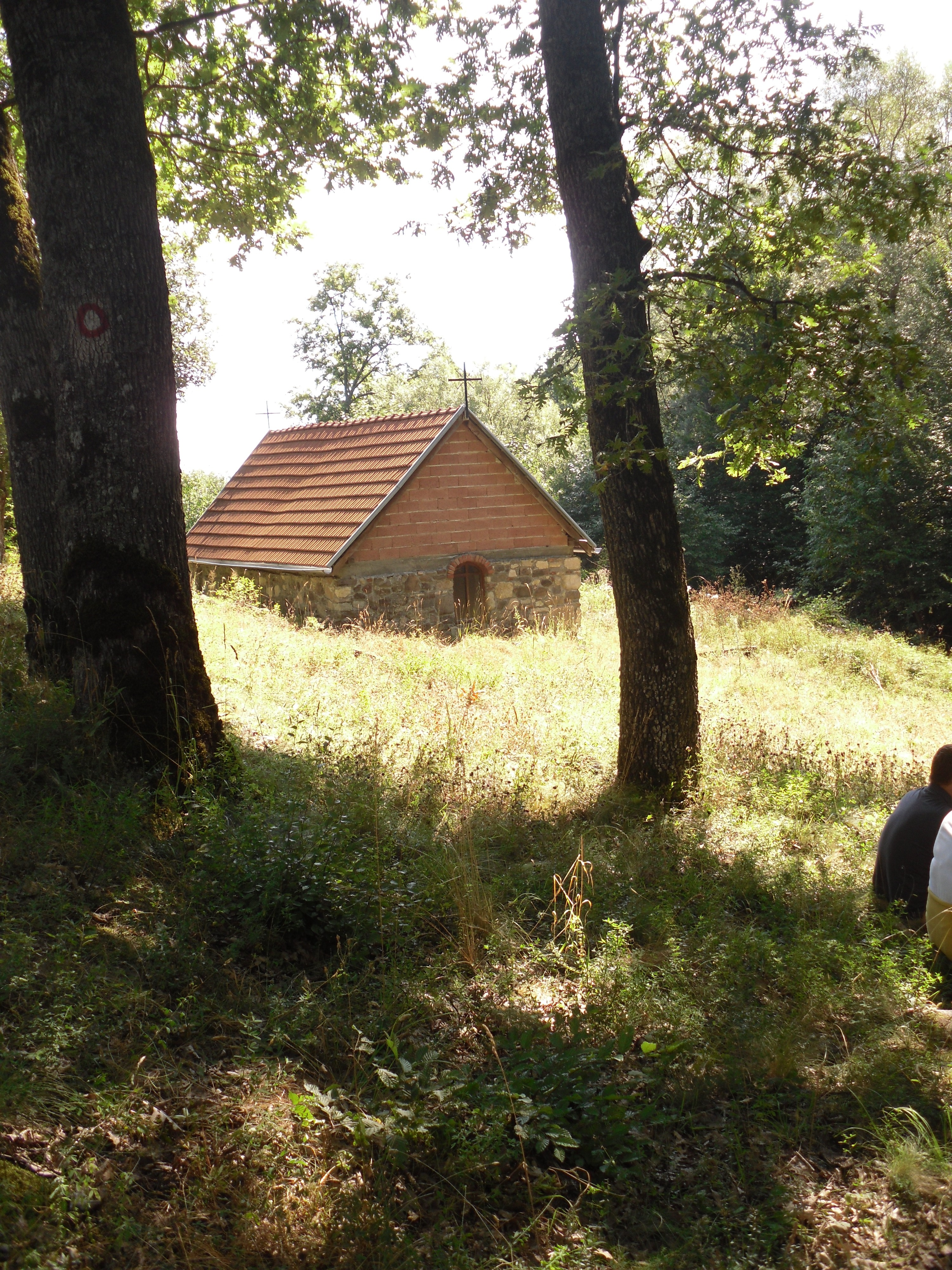
Orthodox church in the village.

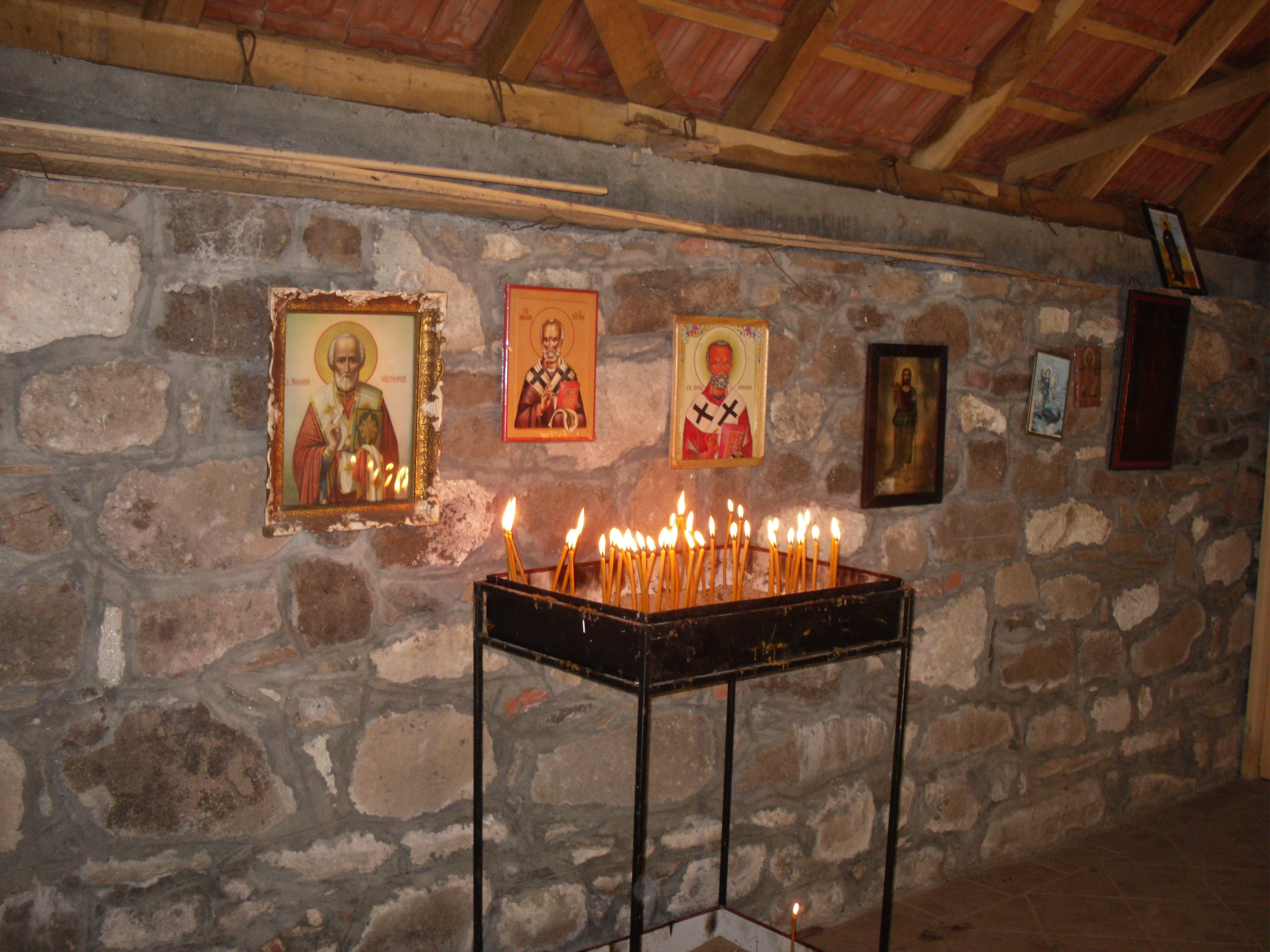
Orthodox church in the village.

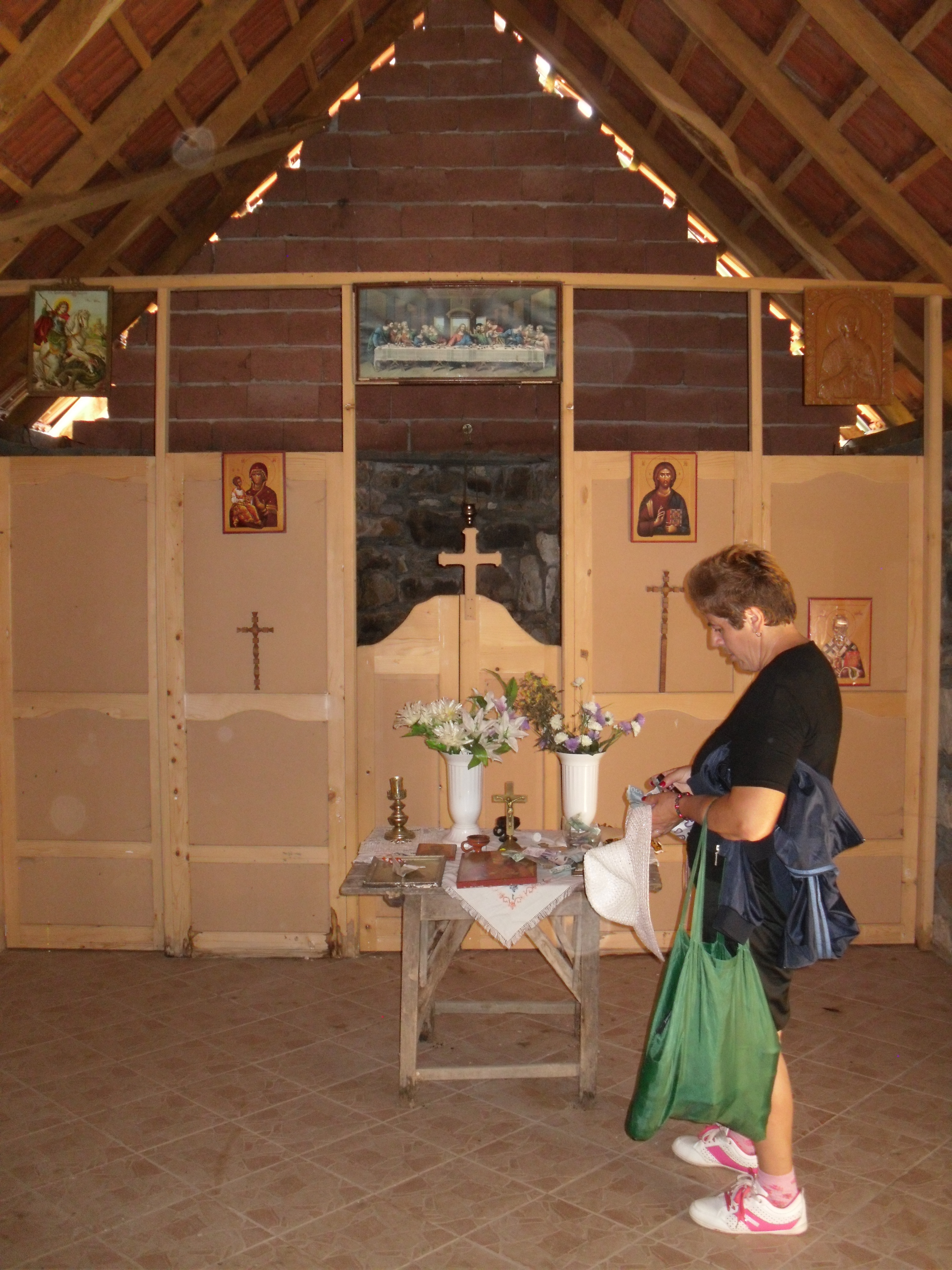
Orthodox church in the village.

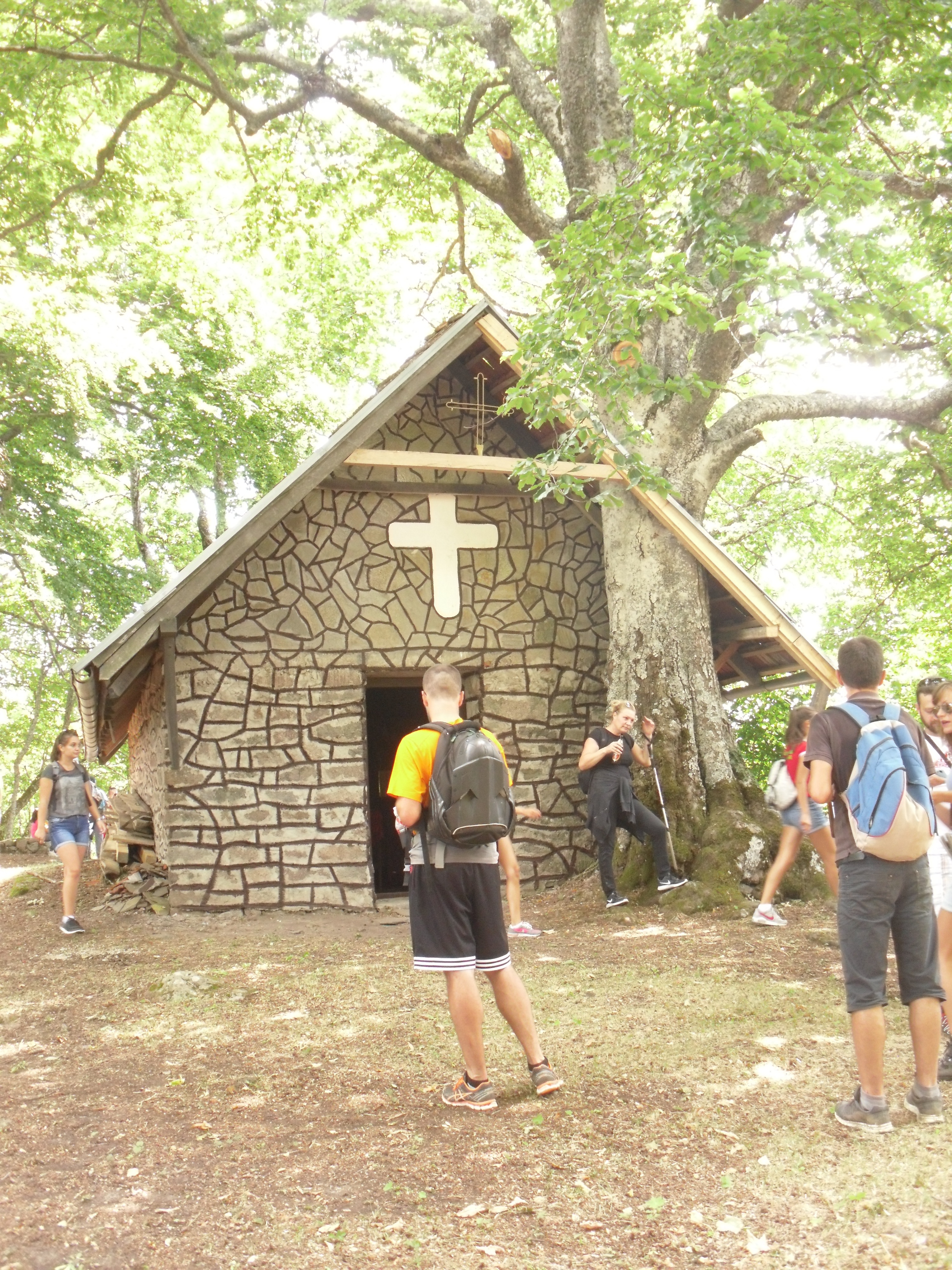
Orthodox church located on the Sveti Petar top.

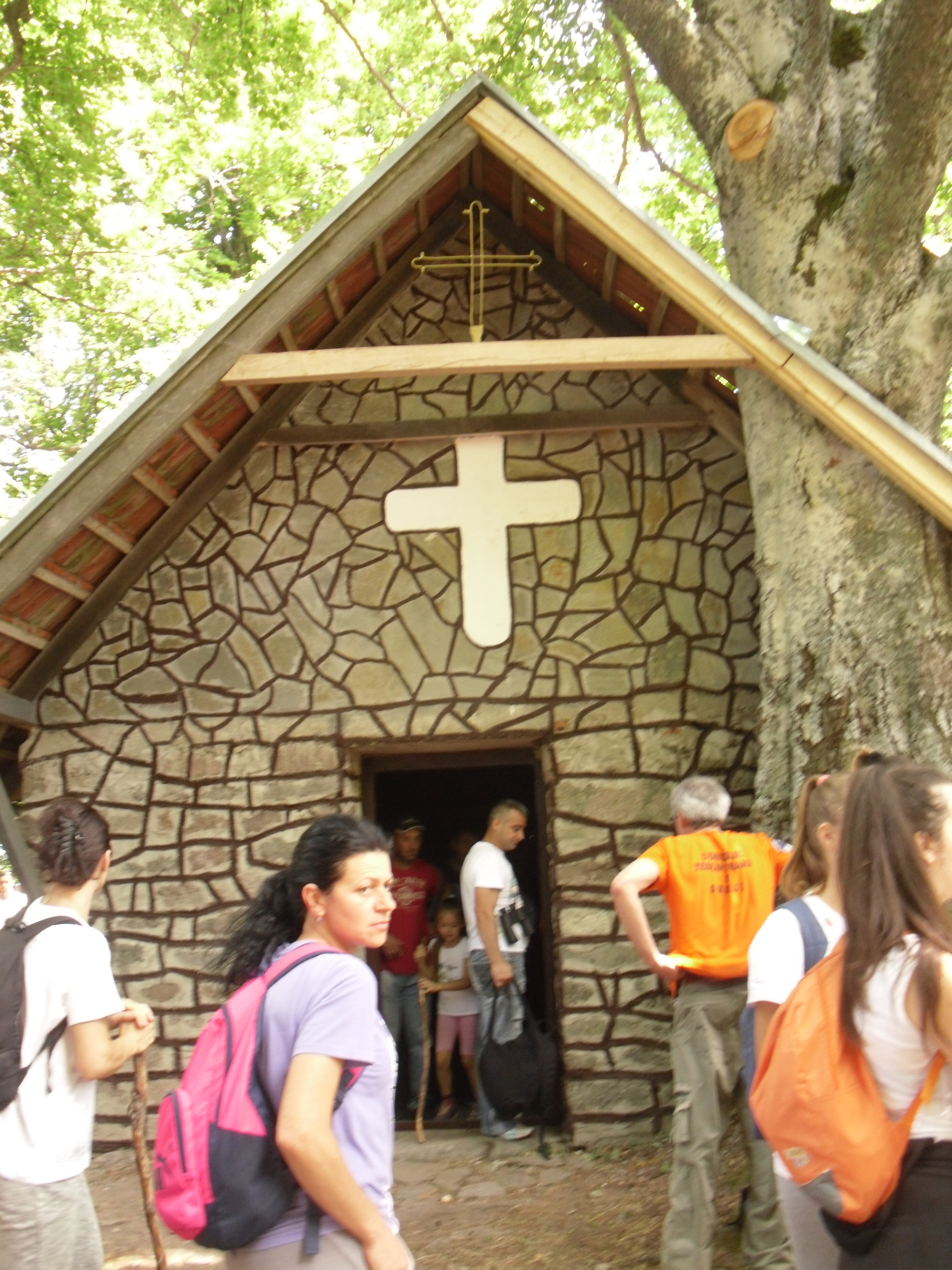
Orthodox church located on the Sveti Petar top.

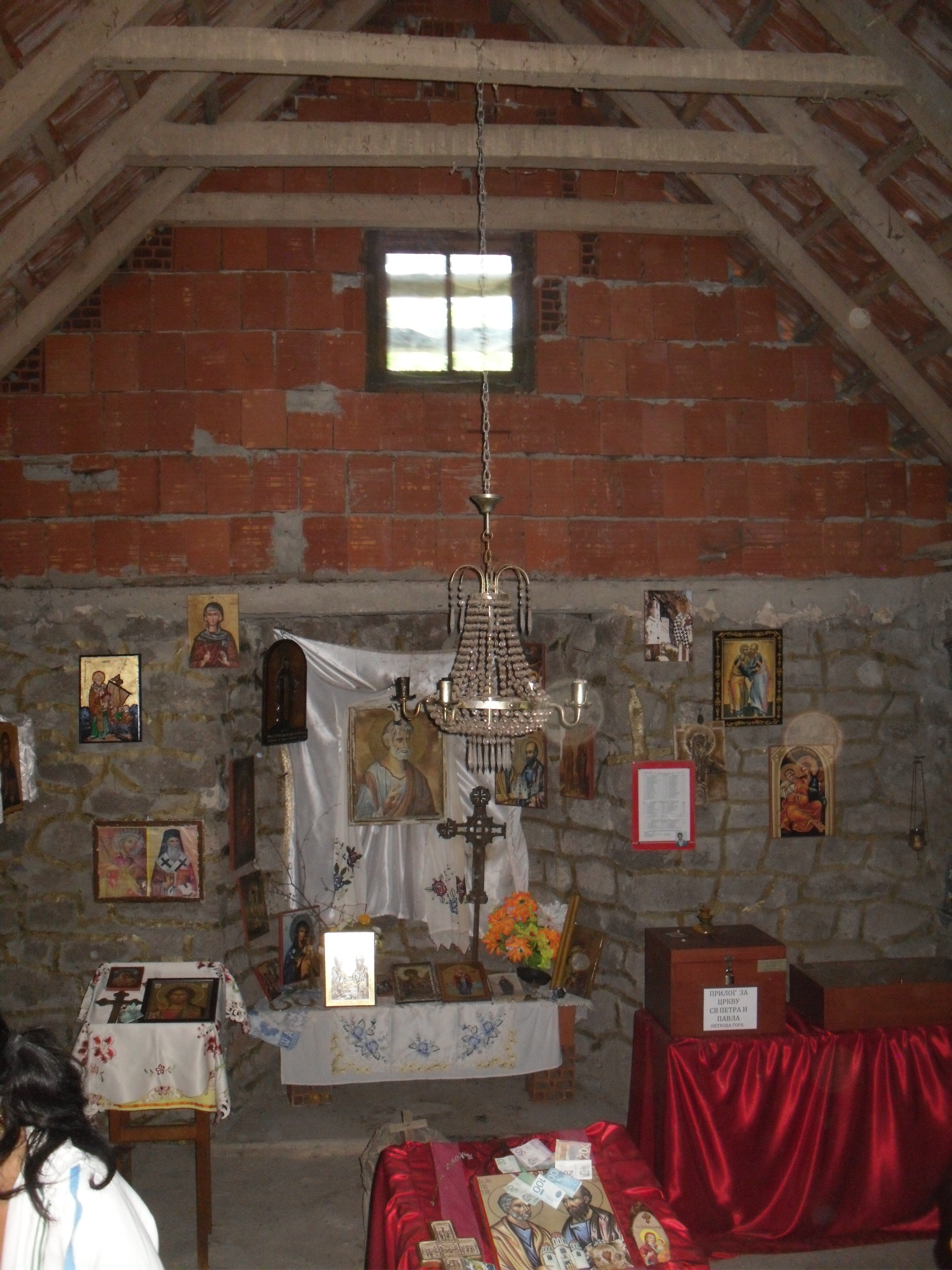
Orthodox church located on the Sveti Petar top.

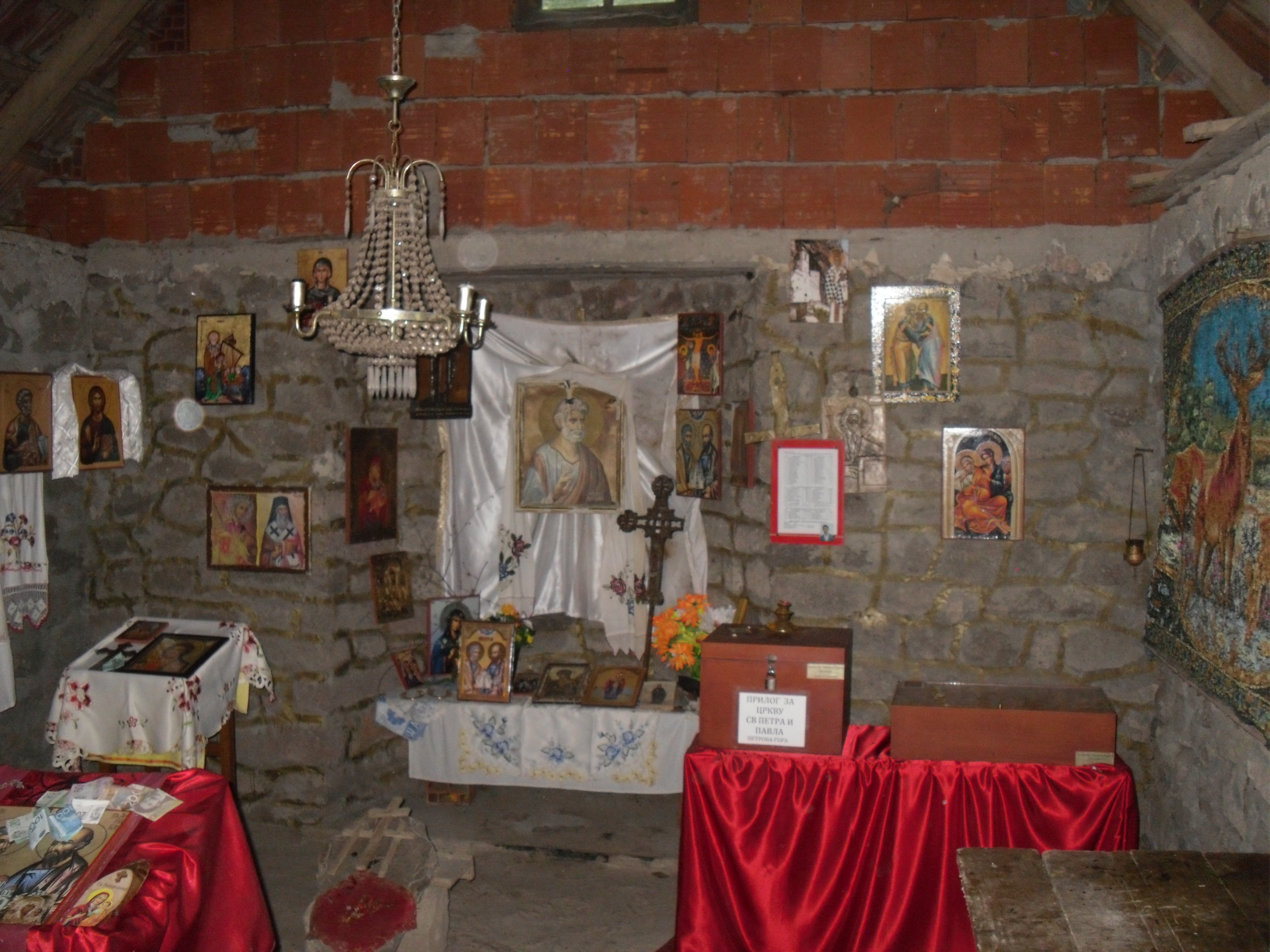
Orthodox church located on the Sveti Petar top.

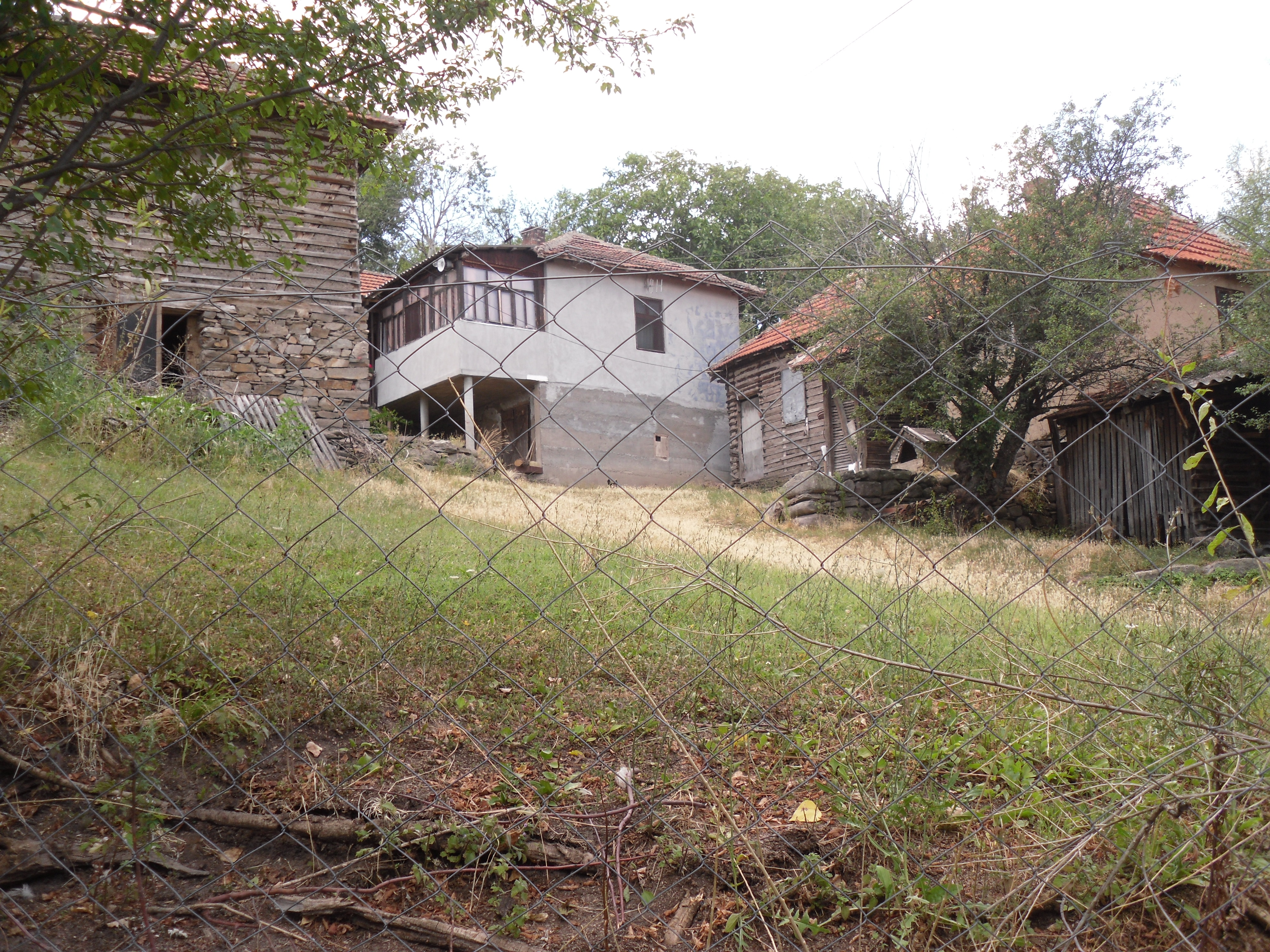
Village's household.

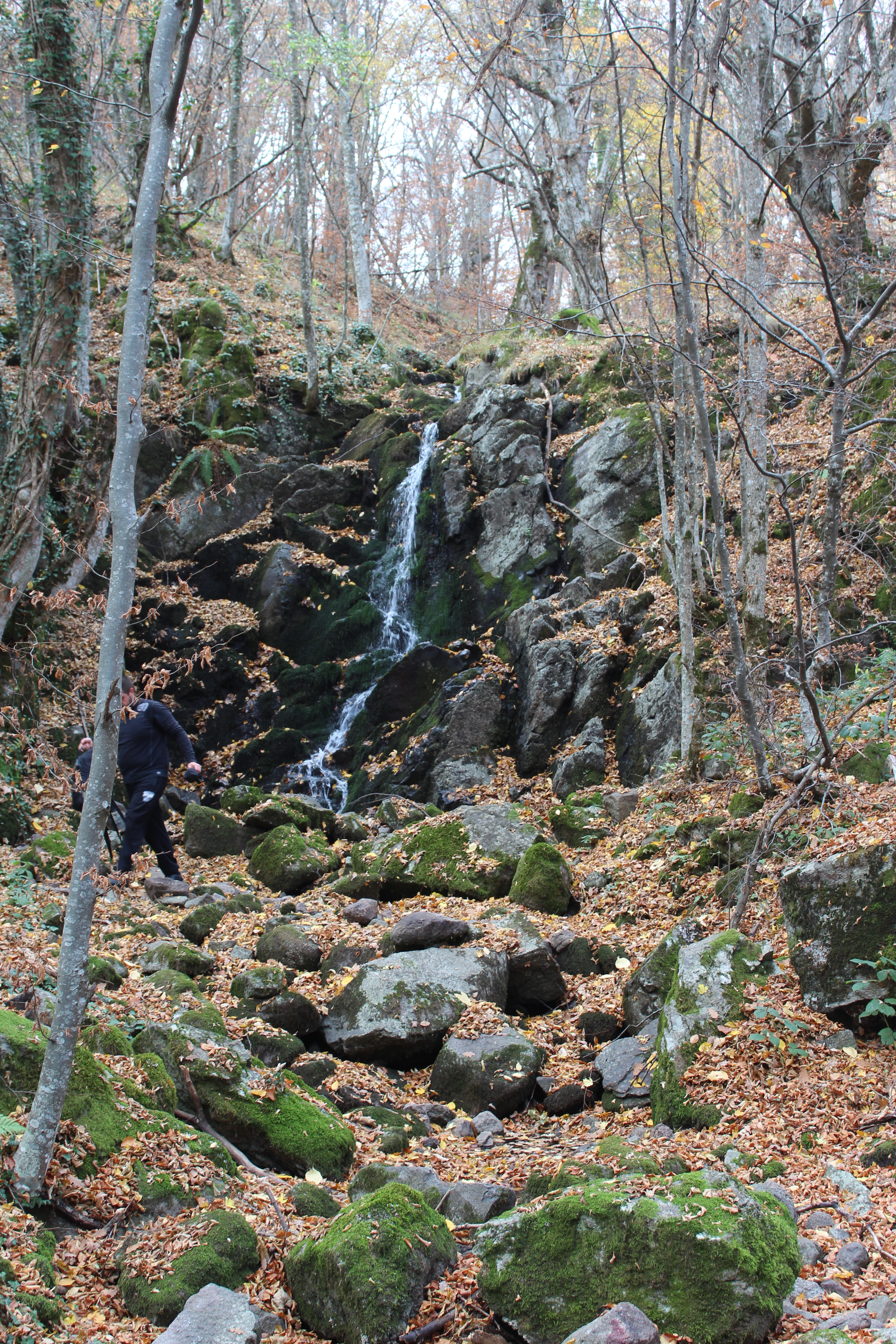
″Borinski skok″ waterfall.

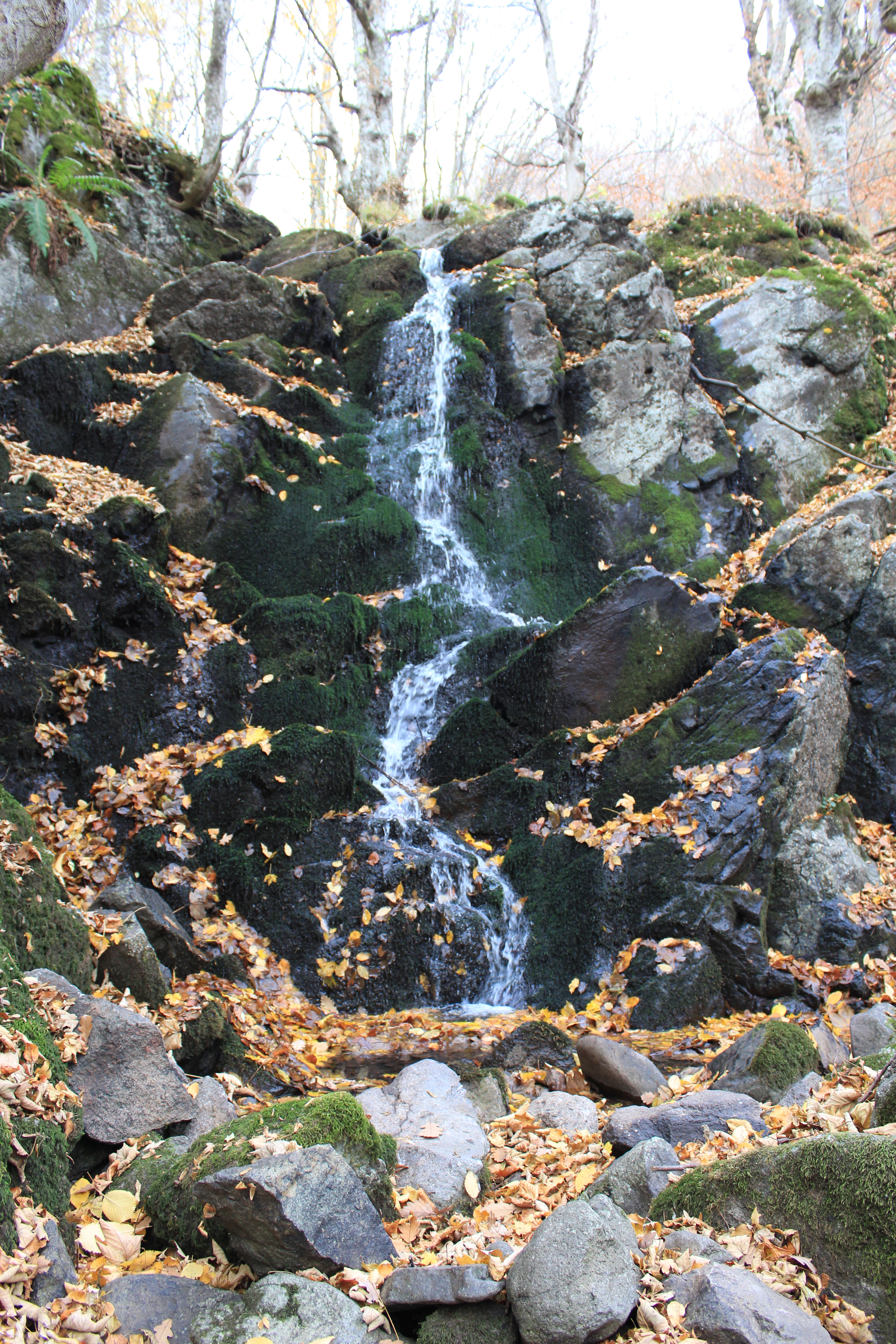
″Borinski skok″ waterfall.

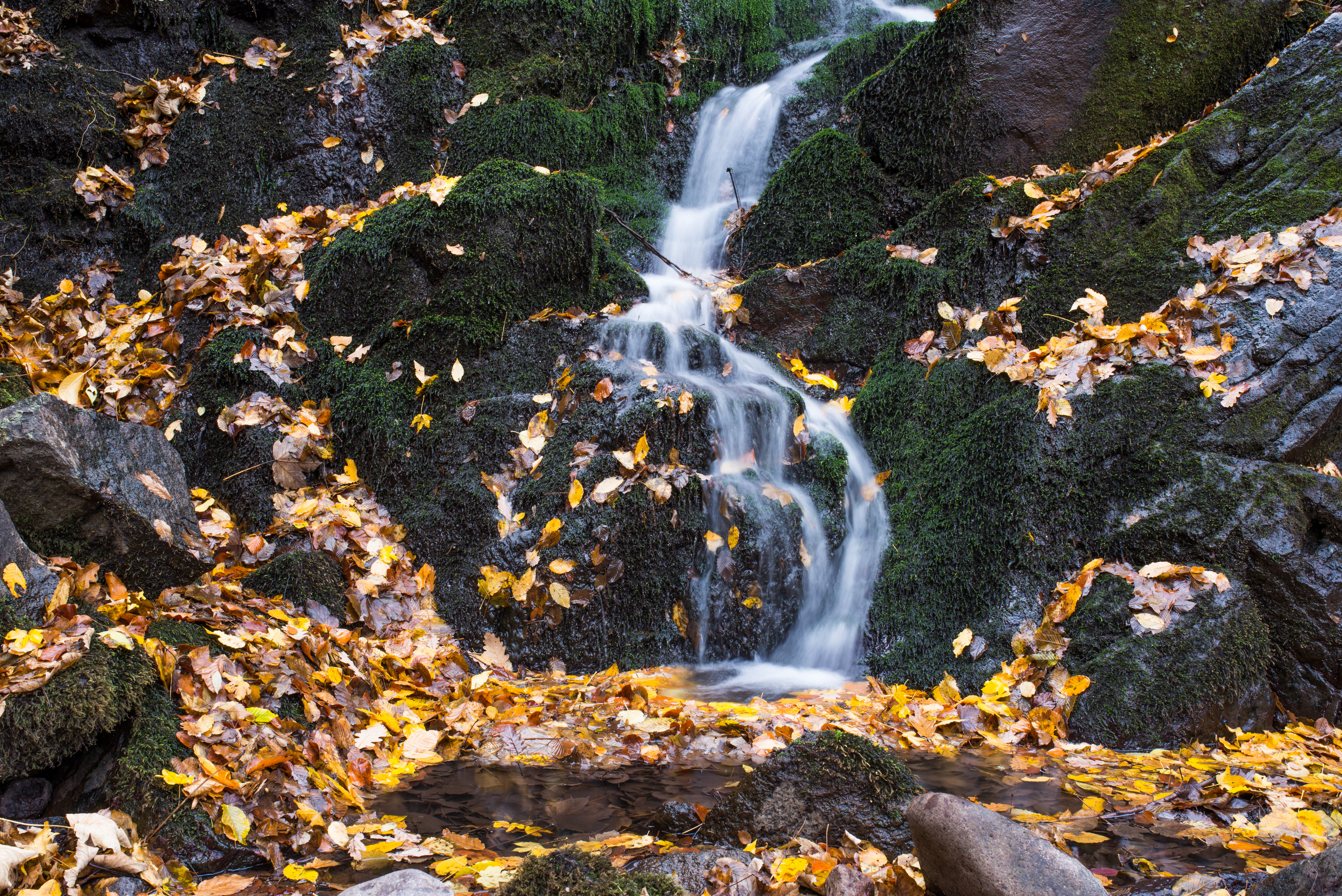
″Borinski skok″ waterfall.

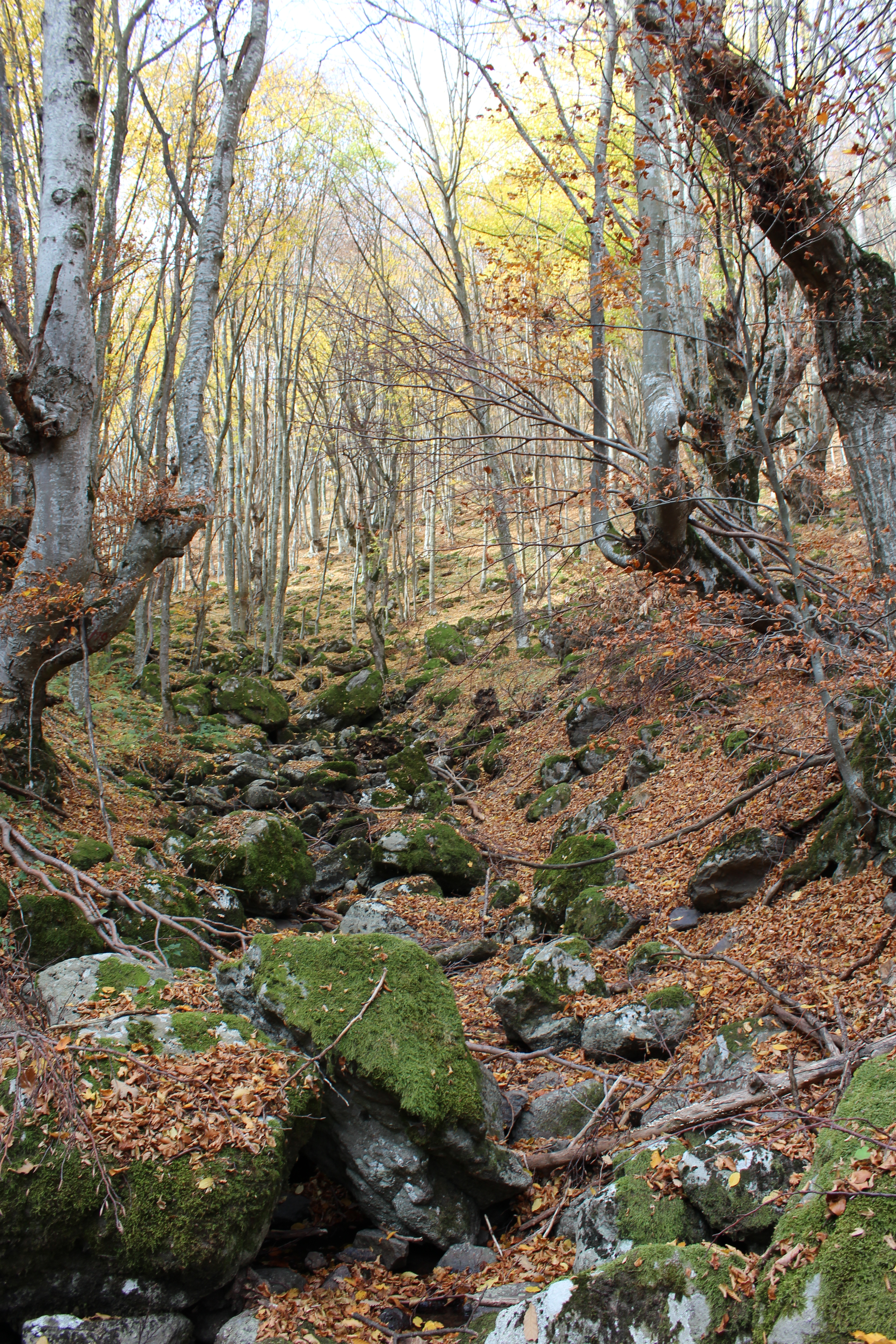
Borinska river bed.
