= Granica, Serbia =

Granica Граница (Serbian)
- Village
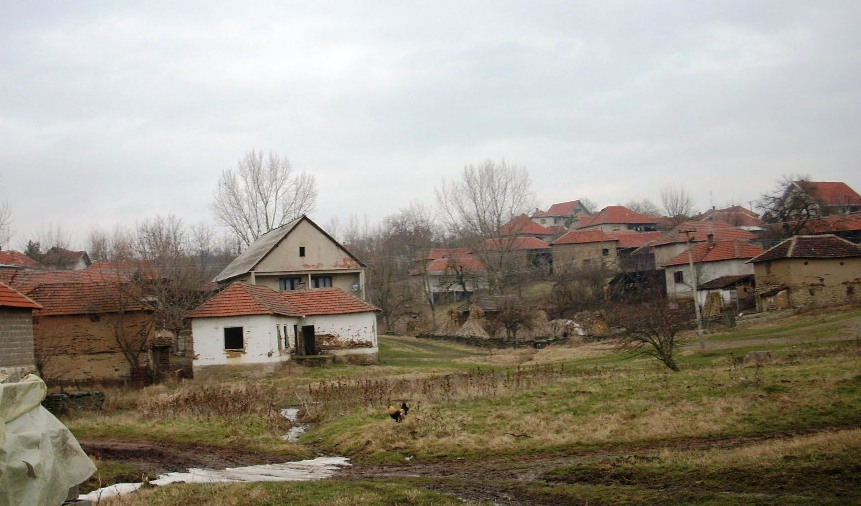

- Location within Serbia
- Coordinates: 43°04′14″N 21°42′41″E
- Country: Serbia
- District: Jablanica District
- Municipality: Bojnik
- Time zone: UTC+1 (CET)
  - Summer (DST): UTC+2 (CEST)

Granica (Serbian Cyrillic: Граница) is a village situated in Bojnik municipality in Serbia.
