= Turjane =

- Village
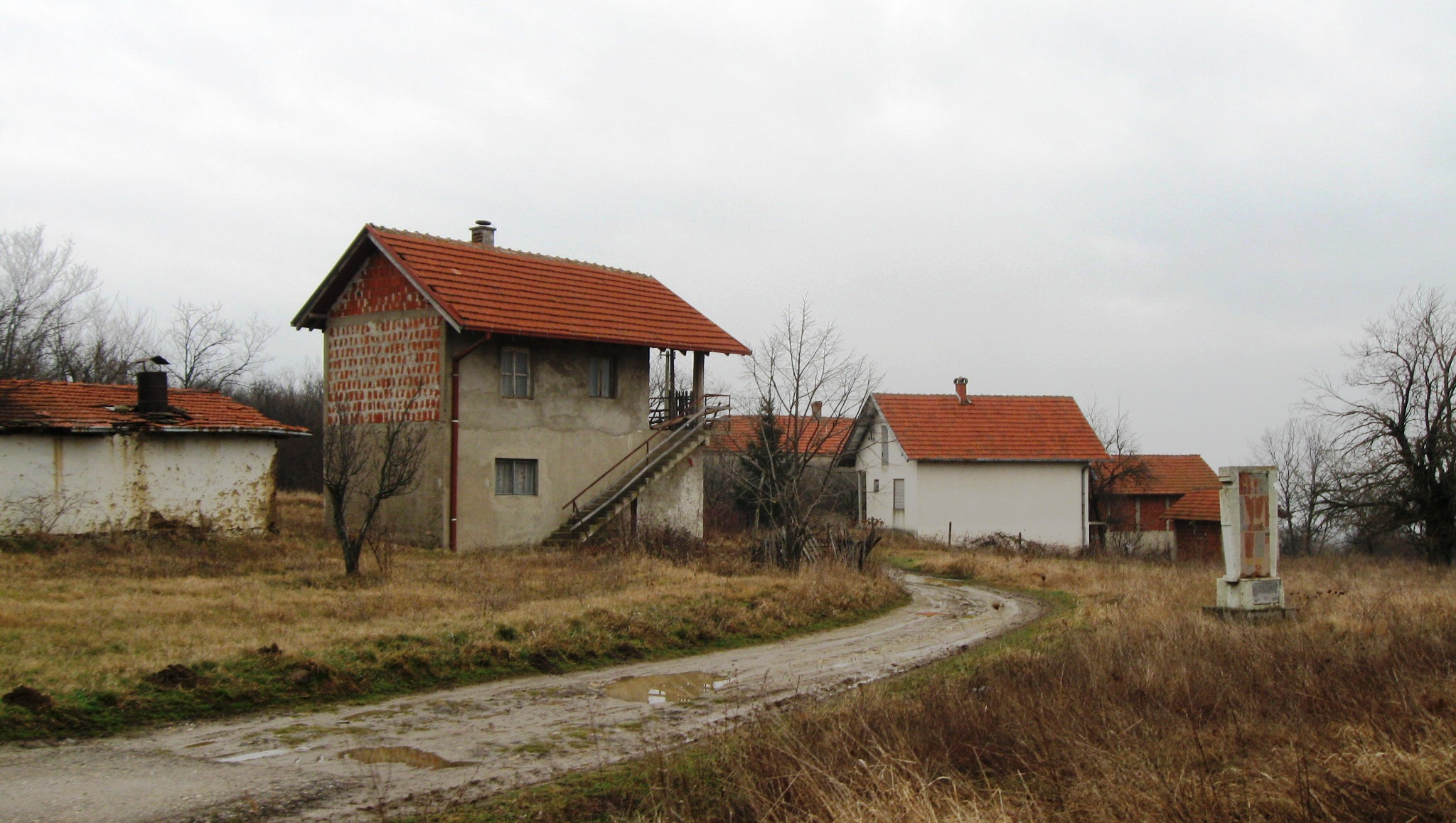
- A street in Turjane

- Location within Serbia
- Coordinates: 42°59′39″N 21°39′26″E
- Country: Serbia
- District: Jablanica District
- Municipality: Bojnik

Population (2002)
  - Total: 79
- Time zone: UTC+1 (CET)
  - Summer (DST): UTC+2 (CEST)

Turjane (Serbian Cyrillic: Турјане) is a village in the municipality of Bojnik, Serbia. According to the 2002 census, the village has a population of 79 people.
