= Dobra Voda, Bojnik =

Dobra Voda Добра Вода (Serbian)
- Village
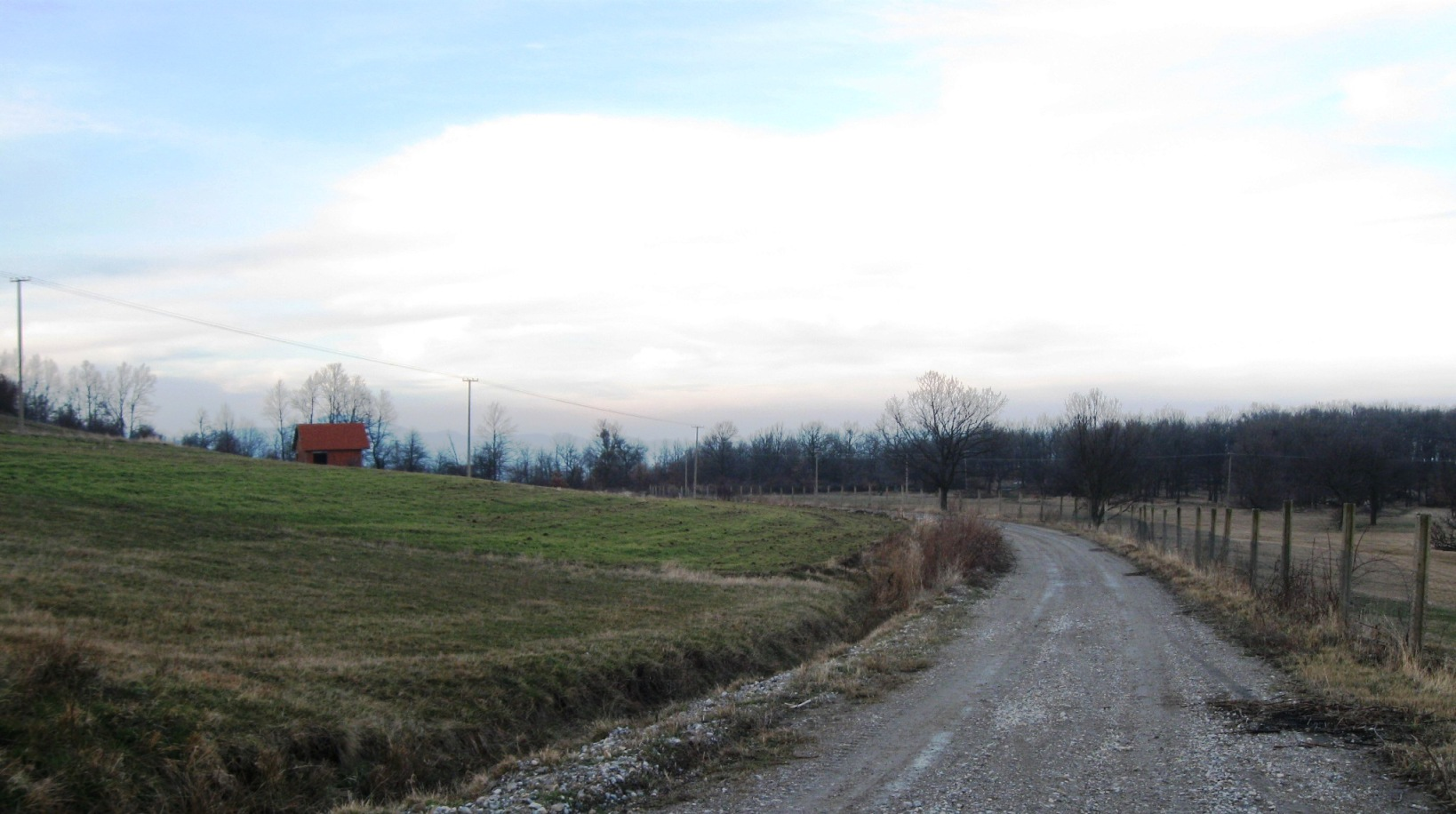

- Location within Serbia
- Coordinates: 43°01′32″N 21°32′29″E
- Country: Serbia
- District: Jablanica District
- Municipality: Bojnik

Population (2002)
  - Total: 88
- Time zone: UTC+1 (CET)
  - Summer (DST): UTC+2 (CEST)

Dobra Voda (Serbian Cyrillic: Добра Вода) is a village in the municipality of Bojnik, Serbia. According to the 2002 census, the village has a population of 88 people.
