= Bojnik Air Base =

- IATA: none; ICAO: none

Summary
- Airport type: Military
- Location: Kosančić, Serbia
- Elevation AMSL: 814 ft (248 m)
- Coordinates: 43°05′38.72″N 21°46′32.74″E

Map
- Location within Serbia

Runways
Direction	Length		Surface
Direction	ft	m	Surface
01/19	5,250	1,600	Grass

Bojnik Air Base (Serbian: Аеродром Бојник / Aerodrom Bojnik) was a military airbase in the village of Kosančić, near the village of Bojnik, about 22 km southeasterly from the centre city of Leskovac. The aerodrome area comprises 0.42 km^{2}, including some barracks. This airfield was used in air battles in the April War at beginning of World War II. It has been sold and became defunct in 2012.
