= Zorovac =

Zorovac Зоровац (Serbian)
- Village
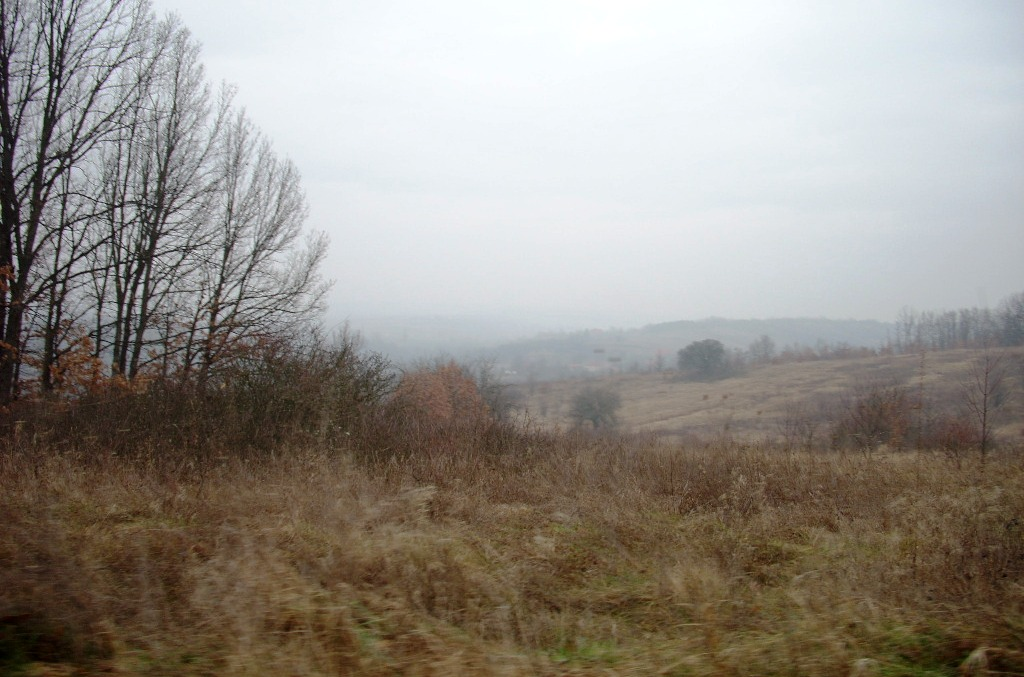

- Location within Serbia
- Coordinates: 43°03′29″N 21°42′56″E
- Country: Serbia
- District: Jablanica District
- Municipality: Bojnik

Population (2002)
  - Total: 19
- Time zone: UTC+1 (CET)
  - Summer (DST): UTC+2 (CEST)

Zorovac (Serbian Cyrillic: Зоровац) is a village in the municipality of Bojnik, Serbia. According to the 2002 census, the village has a population of 19 people.
