= Bojnik, Serbia =

Bojnik Бојник (Serbian)
- Town and municipality
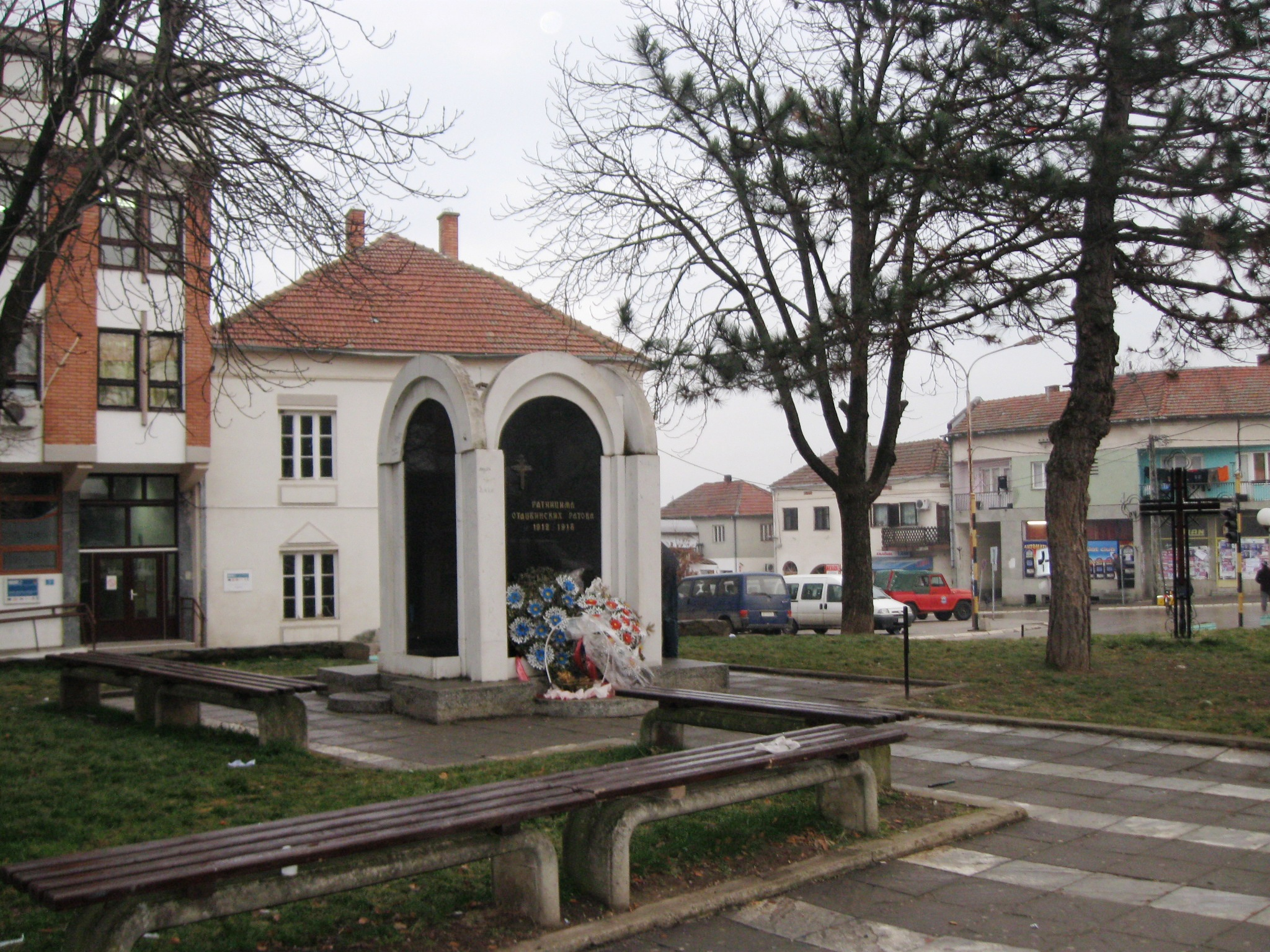
- Bojnik

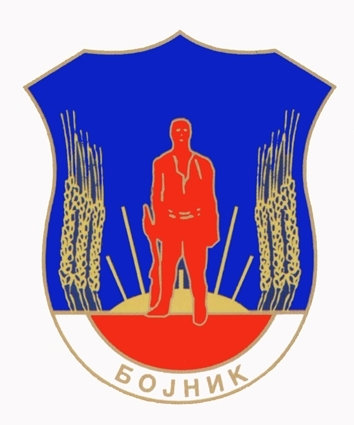
- Coat of arms

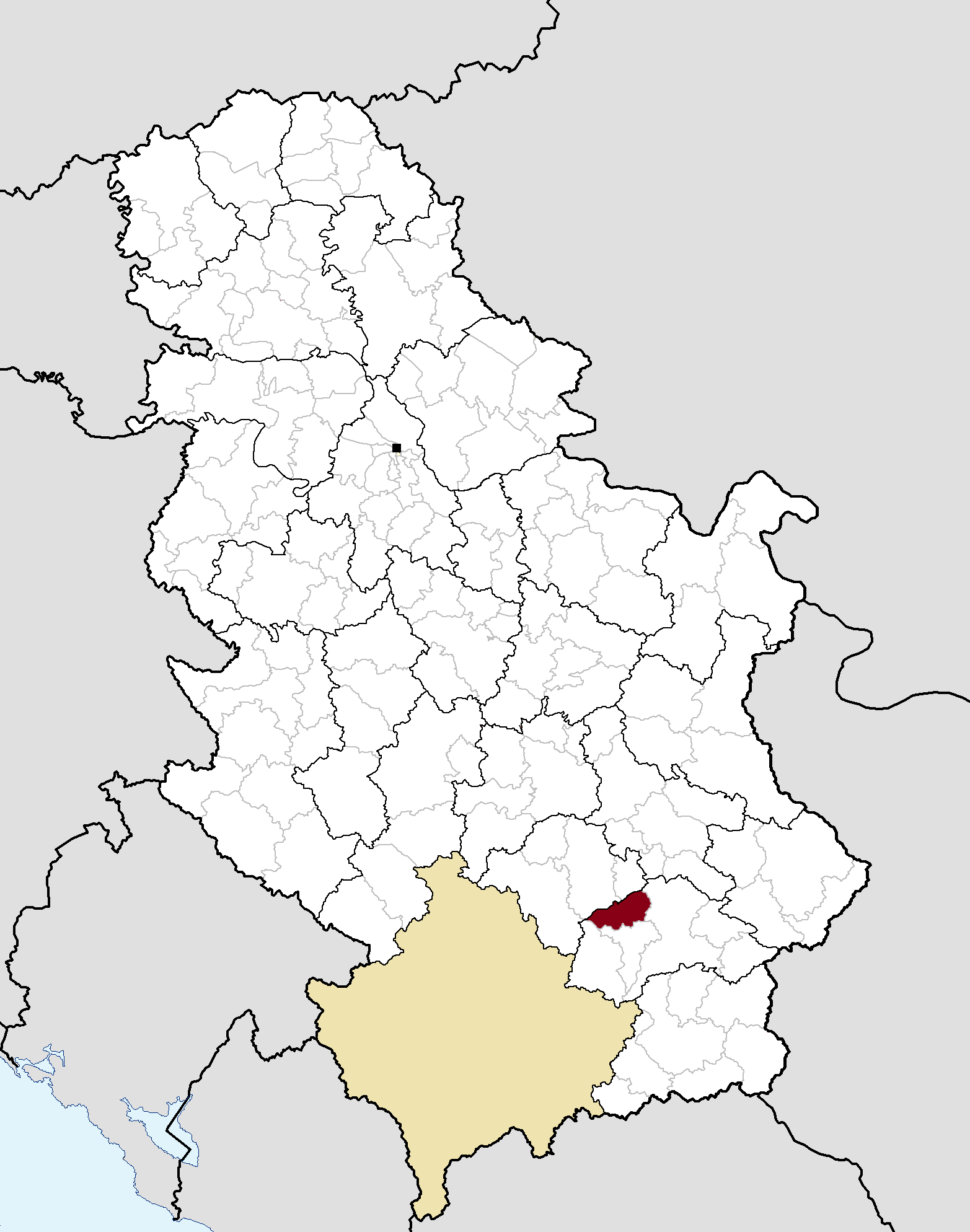
- Location of the municipality of Bojnik within Serbia
- Coordinates: 43°01′N 21°44′E
- Country: Serbia
- Region: Southern and Eastern Serbia
- District: Jablanica
- Settlements: 36

Government
  - Mayor: Nebojša Nenadović (Independent)

Area
  - Town: 9.87 km^{2} (3.81 sq mi)
  - Municipality: 264 km^{2} (102 sq mi)
- Elevation: 242 m (794 ft)

Population (2022 census)
  - Town: 3,087
  - Town density: 313/km^{2} (810/sq mi)
  - Municipality: 9,315
  - Municipality density: 35.3/km^{2} (91.4/sq mi)
- Time zone: UTC+1 (CET)
  - Summer (DST): UTC+2 (CEST)
- Postal code: 16205
- Area code: +381(0)16
- Car plates: LE
- Website: bojnik.rs

Bojnik (Serbian Cyrillic: Бојник) is a town and municipality located in the Jablanica District of southern Serbia. According to 2022 census, the population of the town is 3,087 and population of the municipality was 9,315.

== History ==
The village is mentioned in the 1884 work of M. Milićević. Much of the population settled in Bojnik after World War II. On 17 February 1942, Bulgarian occupation forces massacred about 476 inhabitants of Bojnik and surroundings in response to the alleged sheltering of Partisans.

== Geography ==
The settlement of Bojnik is located in the region of Pusta Reka, and the Pusta river crosses by it. The Bojnik municipality is located in southern Serbia and it is surrounded by municipality of Medveđa in the south-west, municipality of Lebane in the south, municipality of Leskovac in the east, and municipalities of Žitorađa and Prokuplje in the north.

== Settlements ==
Aside from the town of Bojnik, the following villages consist the municipality of Bojnik:

- Borince
- Brestovac
- Vujanovo
- Gornje Brijanje
- Gornje Konjuvce
- Granica
- Dobra Voda
- Donje Konjuvce
- Dragovac
- Dubrava
- Đinđuša
- Zeletovo
- Zorovac
- Ivanje
- Kamenica
- Kacabać
- Kosančić
- Lapotince
- Lozane
- Magaš
- Majkovac
- Mijajlica
- Mrveš
- Obilić
- Obražda
- Orane
- Plavce
- Pridvorica
- Rečica
- Savinac
- Slavnik
- Stubla
- Turjane
- Ćukovac
- Crkvica

== Demographics ==
Historical population
Year	Pop.	±% p.a.
1948	21,895	—
1953	22,329	+0.39%
1961	20,838	−0.86%
1971	18,801	−1.02%
1981	16,246	−1.45%
1991	14,498	−1.13%
2002	13,118	−0.91%
2011	11,104	−1.83%
2022	9,315	−1.58%

According to the 2011 census results, the municipality has 11,104 inhabitants.

=== Ethnic groups ===
The ethnic composition of the municipality:

Ethnic group	Population	%
Serbs	9,197	82.83%
Romani	1,649	14.85%
Montenegrins	17	0.15%
Macedonians	10	0.09%
Others	231	2.08%
Total	11,104	

== Economy ==
The average salary in Bojnik (2025) is significantly below the national net wage average.

The following table gives a preview of total number of employed people per their core activity (as of 2017):

Activity	Total
Agriculture, forestry and fishing	42
Mining	3
Processing industry	187
Distribution of power, gas and water	12
Distribution of water and water waste management	56
Construction	131
Wholesale and retail, repair	170
Traffic, storage and communication	17
Hotels and restaurants	11
Media and telecommunications	5
Finance and insurance	1
Property stock and charter	-
Professional, scientific, innovative and technical activities	21
Administrative and other services	3
Administration and social assurance	154
Education	225
Healthcare and social work	126
Art, leisure and recreation	26
Other services	20
Total	1,207

== Gallery ==
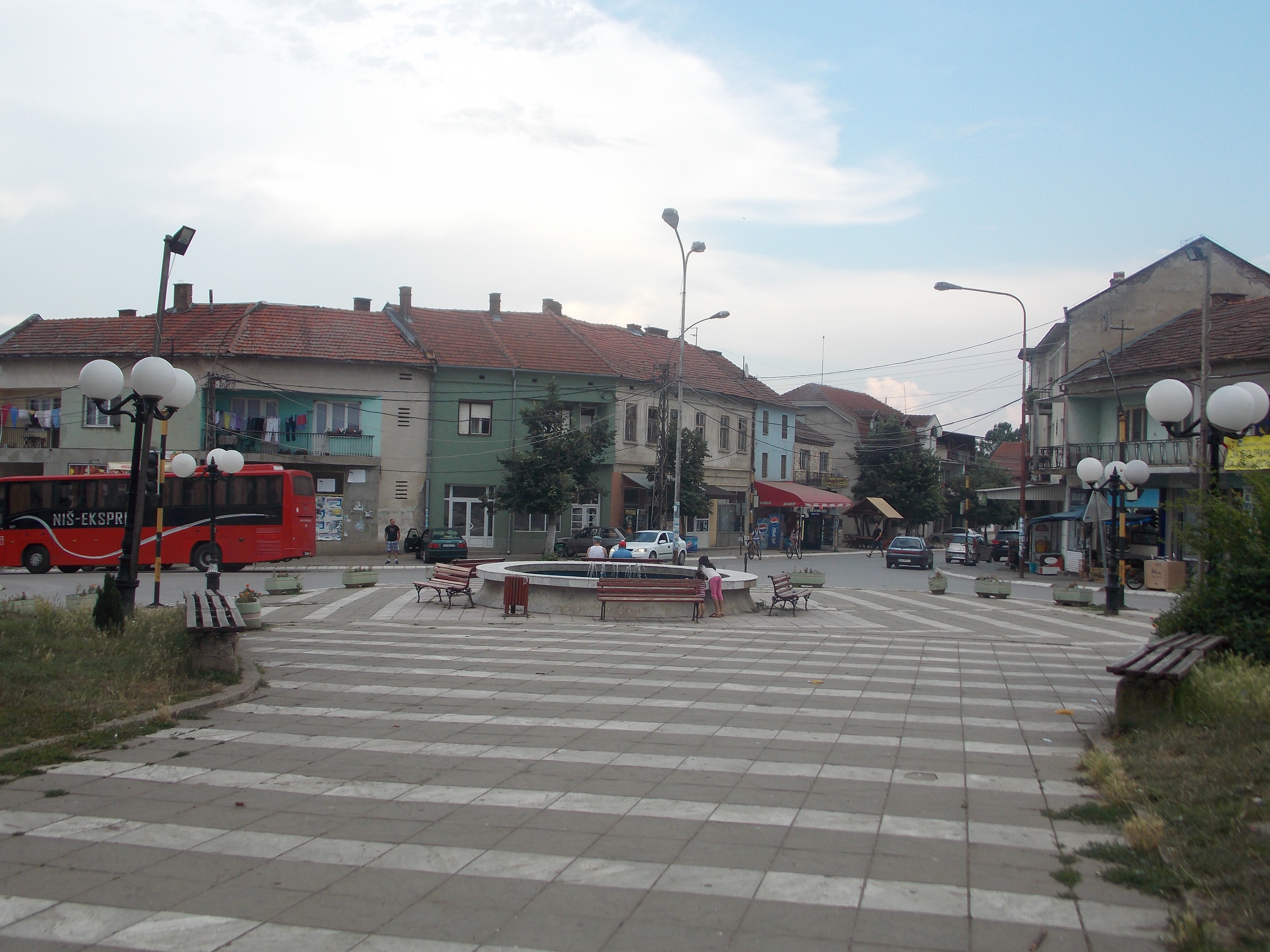
Town center

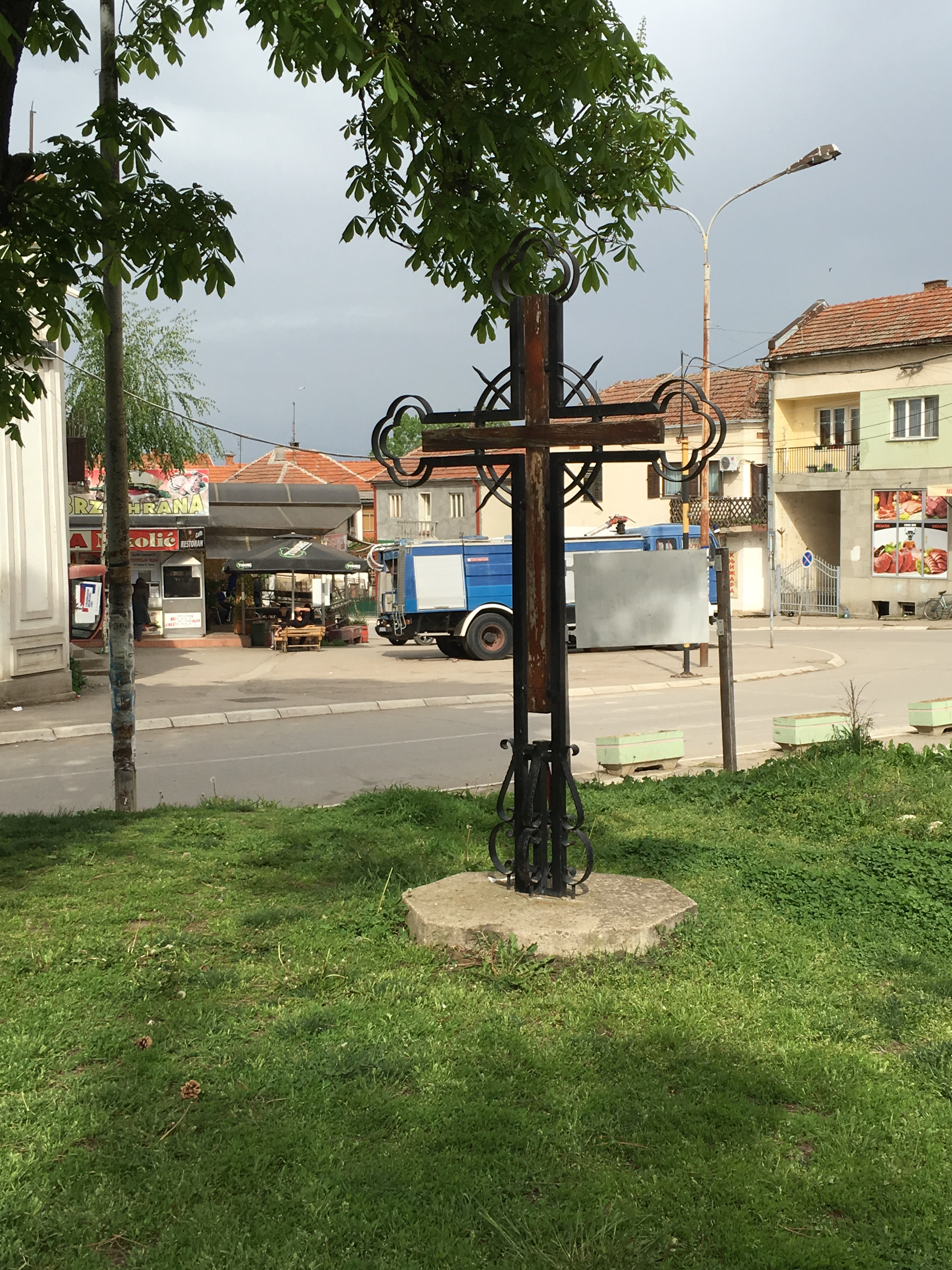
Town center

== See also ==
- Subdivisions of Serbia
- Bojnik-Kosančić Airport

== Sources ==
- Milićević, Milan Djuro (1884). Краљевина Србија: Ђ нови крајеви : Географија - Орографија - Хидрографија - Топографија - Аркеологија - Историја - Етнографија - Статистика - Просвета - Култура - Управа. Državna štamparija. p. 347.
