= Majkovac =

- Village
- Location within Serbia
- Coordinates: 42°58′49″N 21°35′32″E
- Country: Serbia
- District: Jablanica District
- Municipality: Bojnik

Population (2002)
  - Total: 23
- Time zone: UTC+1 (CET)
  - Summer (DST): UTC+2 (CEST)

Majkovac (Serbian Cyrillic: Мајковац) is a village in the municipality of Bojnik, Serbia. According to the 2002 census, the village has a population of 23 people.

== Gallery ==
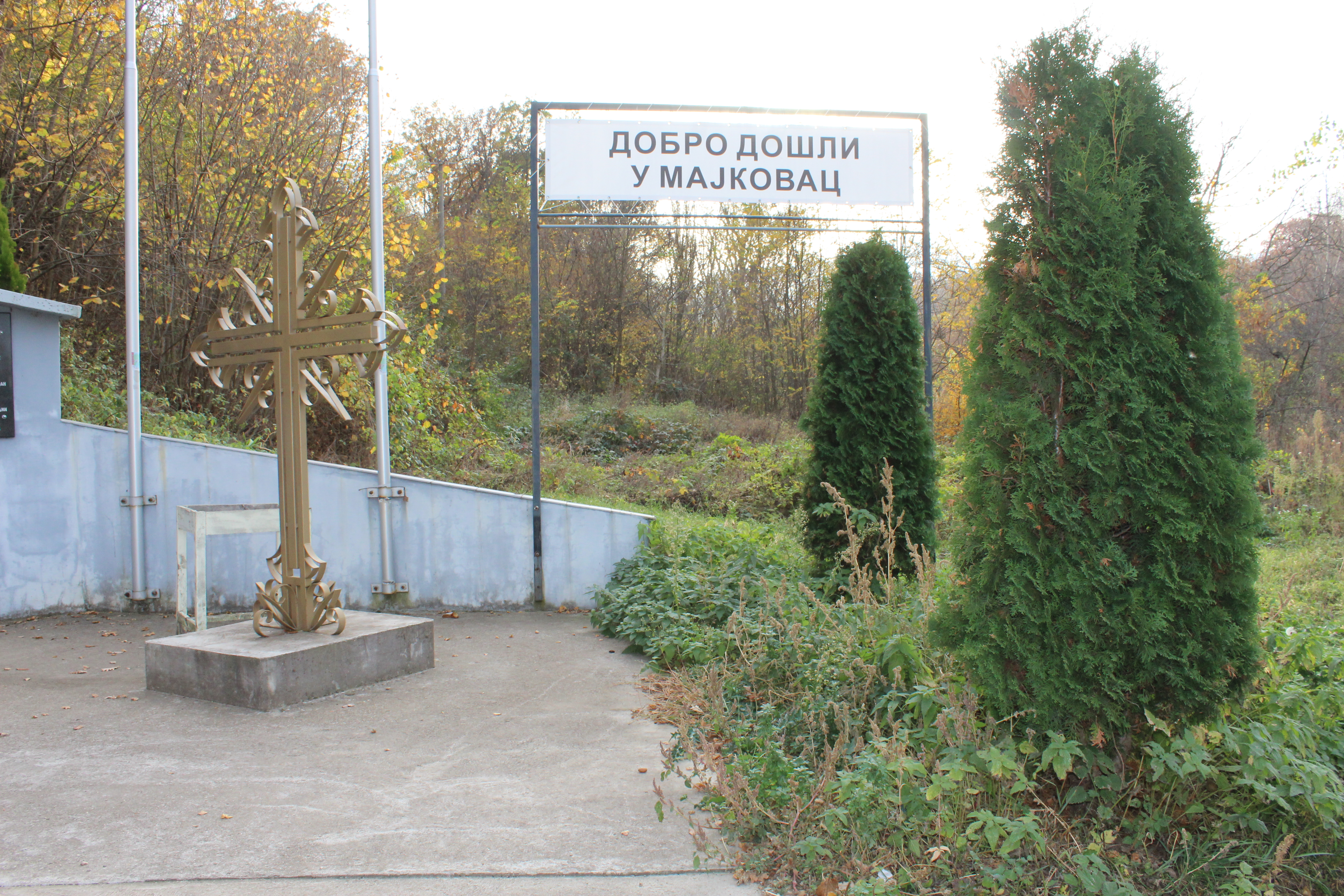

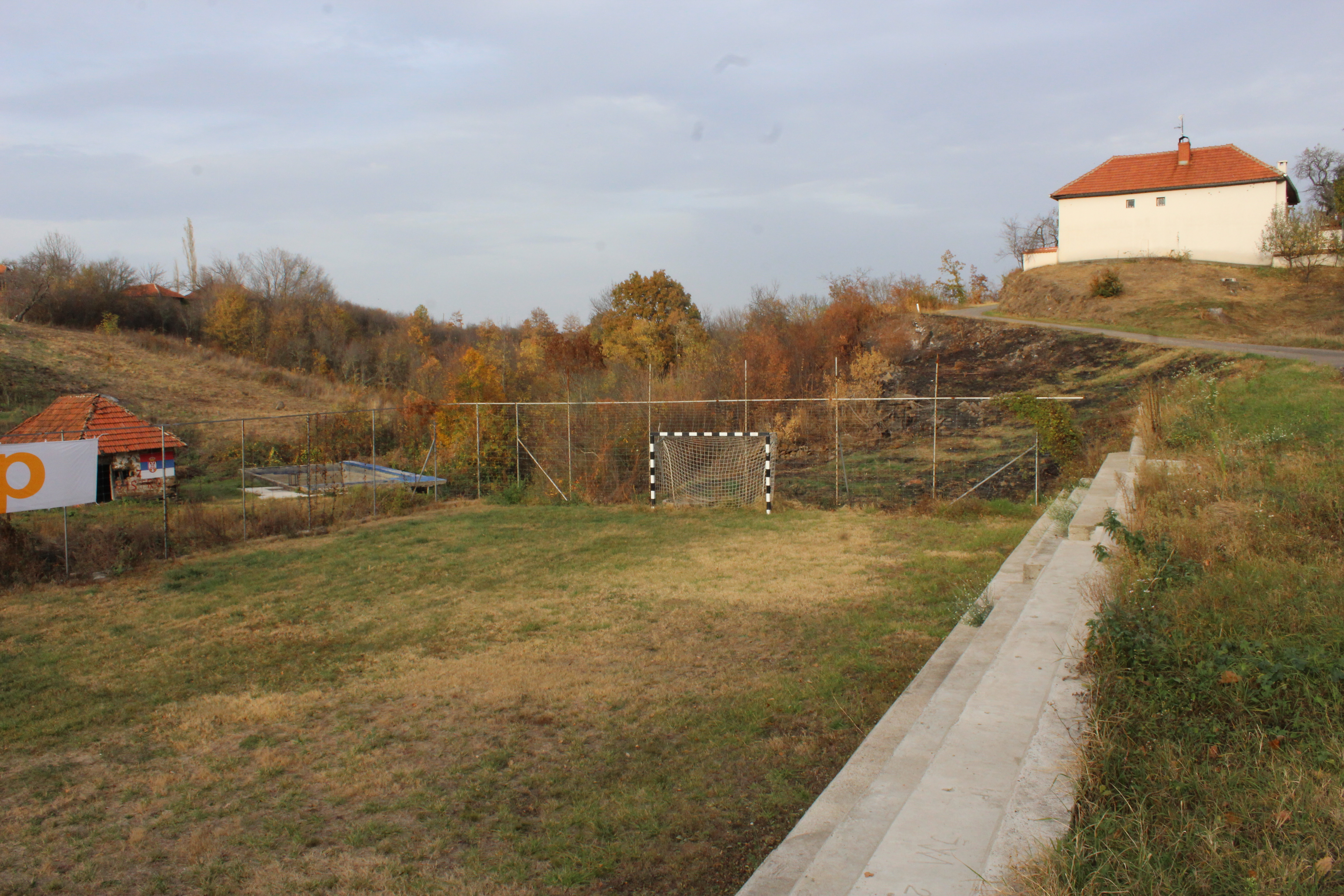

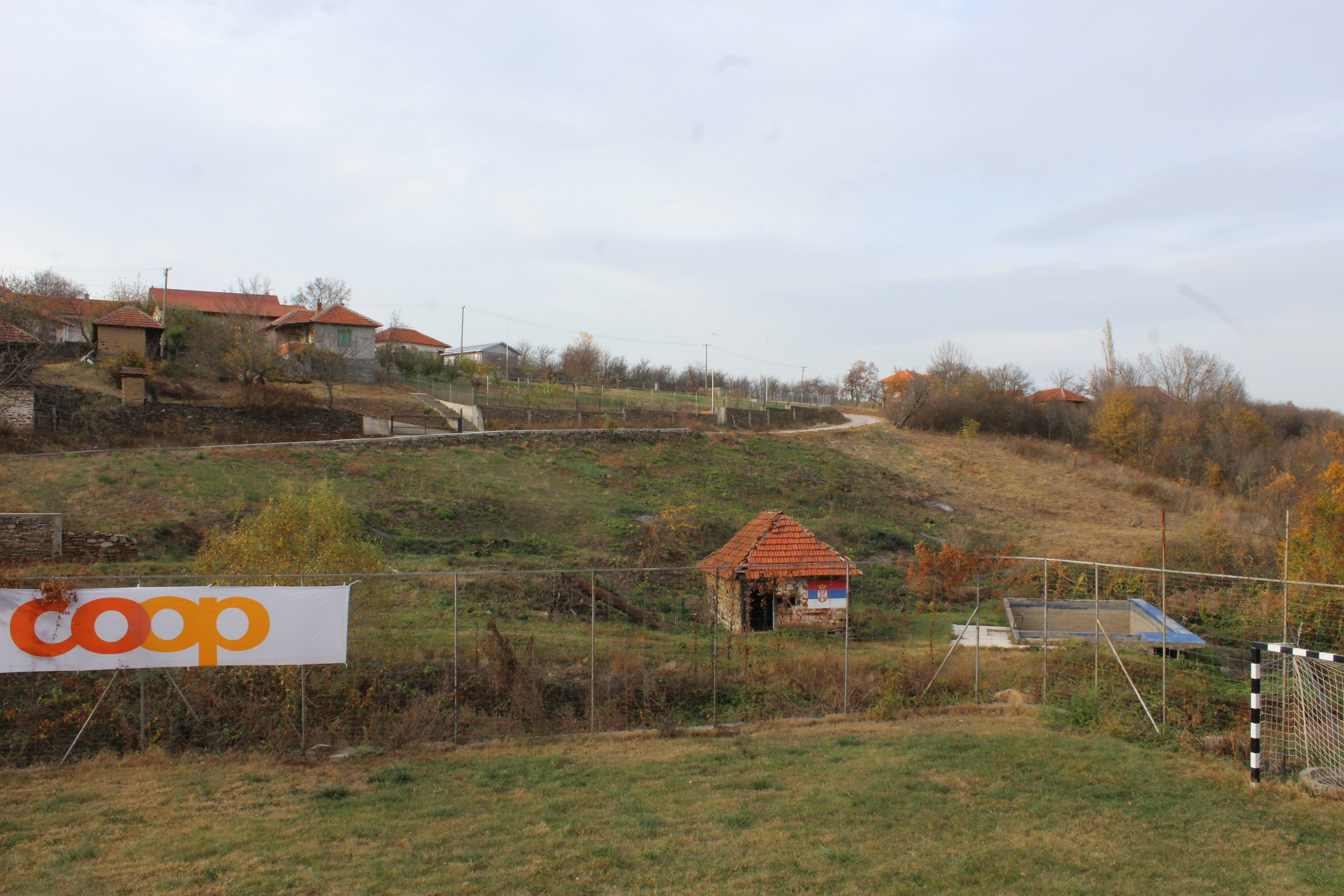

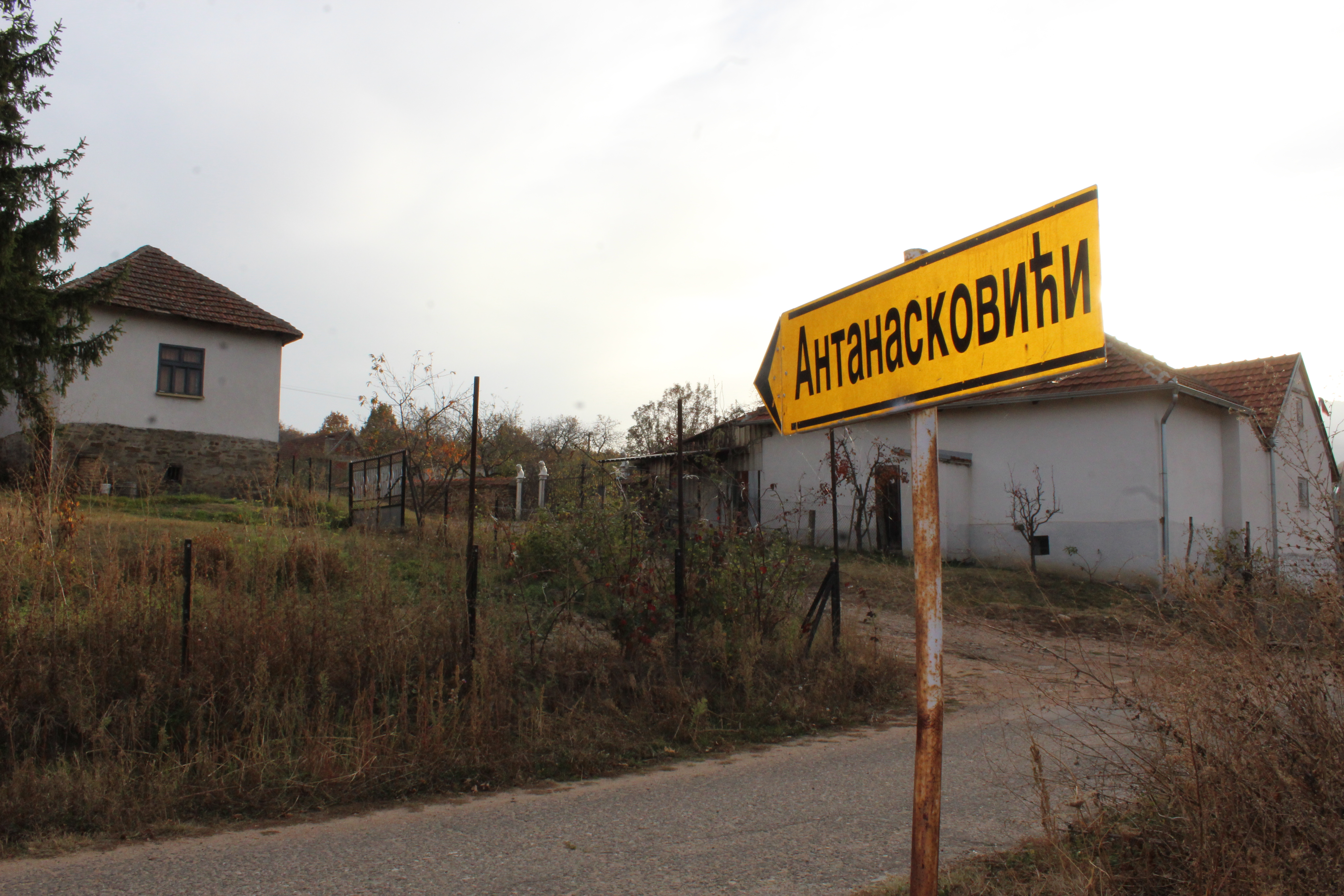

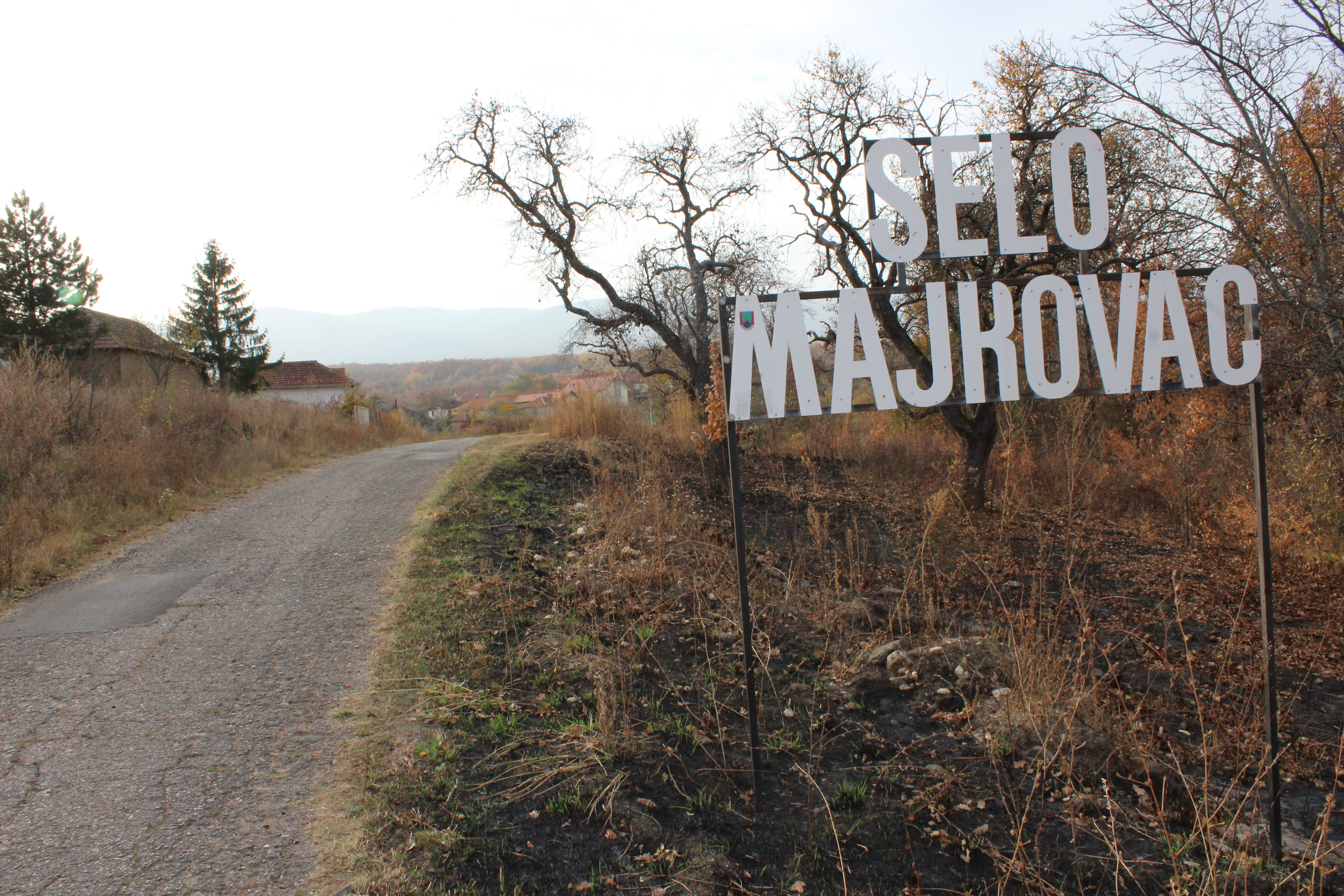
