= Obražda =

- Village
- Location within Serbia
- Coordinates: 42°59′16″N 21°34′02″E
- Country: Serbia
- District: Jablanica District
- Municipality: Bojnik

Population (2002)
  - Total: 34
- Time zone: UTC+1 (CET)
  - Summer (DST): UTC+2 (CEST)

Obražda (Serbian Cyrillic: Ображда) is a village in the municipality of Bojnik, Serbia. According to the 2002 census, the village has a population of 34 people.
