= Ivanje, Bojnik =

Ivanje Ивање (Serbian)
- Village
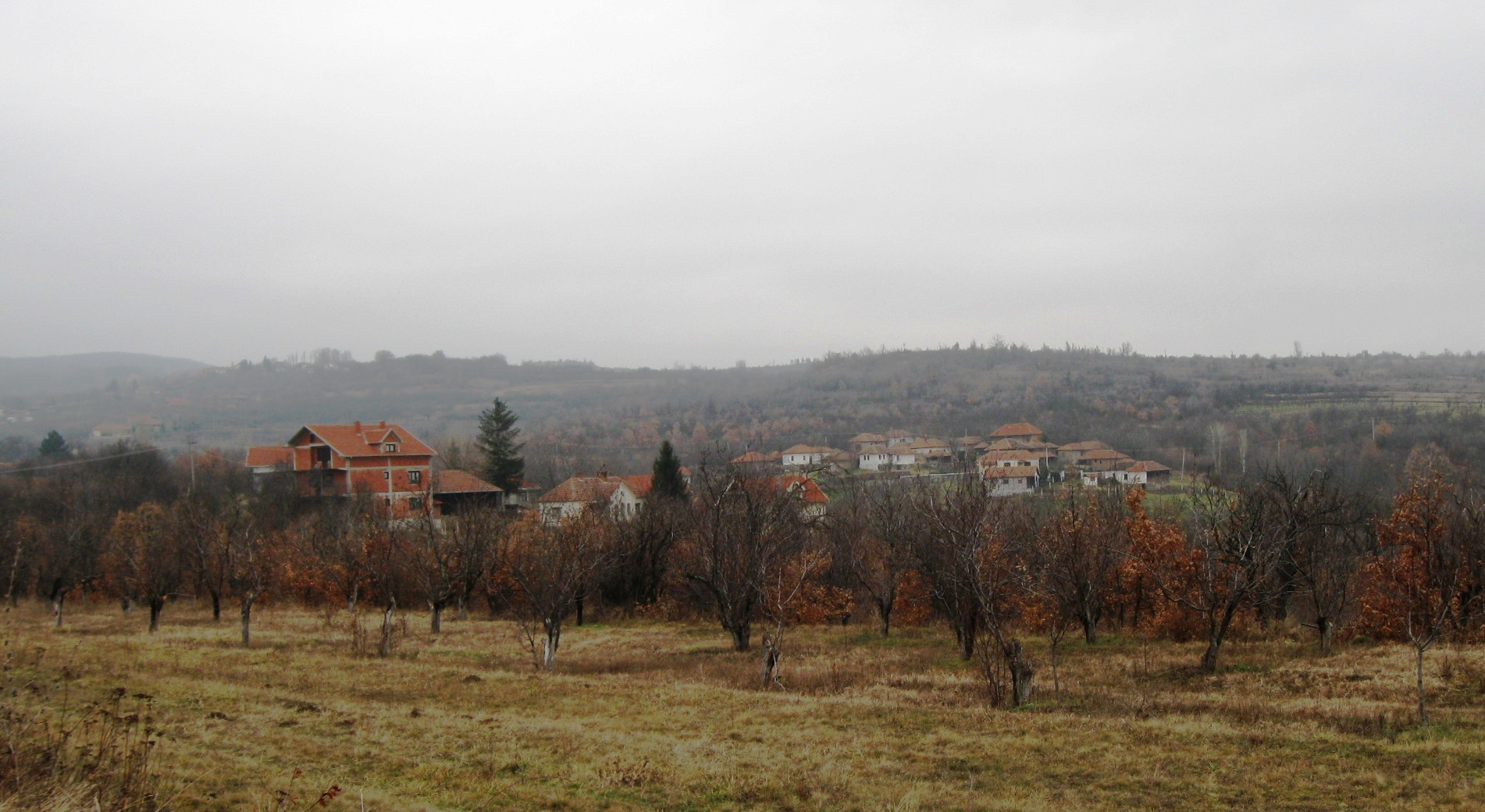
- Village Ivanje

- Location within Serbia
- Coordinates: 42°59′55″N 21°35′11″E
- Country: Serbia
- District: Jablanica District
- Municipality: Bojnik

Population (2002)
  - Total: 88
- Time zone: UTC+1 (CET)
  - Summer (DST): UTC+2 (CEST)

Ivanje (Serbian Cyrillic: Ивање) is a village in the municipality of Bojnik, Serbia. According to the 2002 census, the village has a population of 88 people.
