= Zeletovo =

Zeletovo Зелетово (Serbian)
- Village
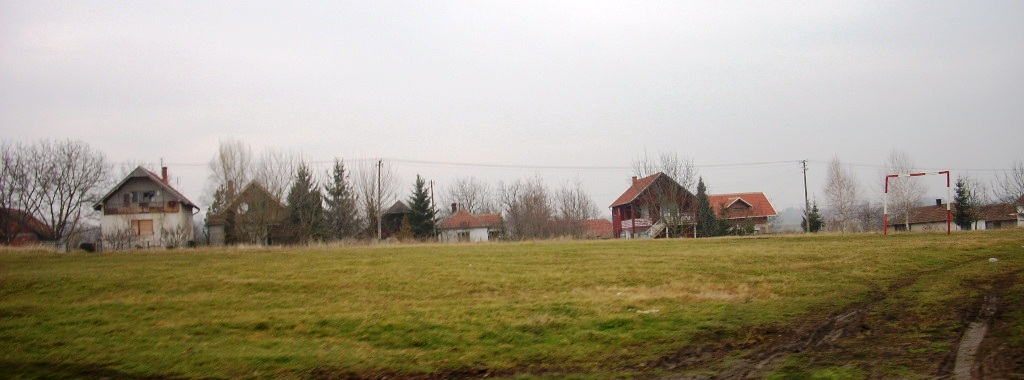
- View on Zeletovo

- Location within Serbia
- Coordinates: 43.0367°N 21.7497°E
- Country: Serbia
- District: Jablanica District
- Municipality: Bojnik

Population (2002)
  - Total: 110
- Time zone: UTC+1 (CET)
  - Summer (DST): UTC+2 (CEST)

Zeletovo (Serbian Cyrillic: Зелетово) (until 1972 Suvo Polje) is a village in the municipality of Bojnik, Serbia. According to the 2002 census, the village has a population of 110 people.
