= Plavce =

- Village
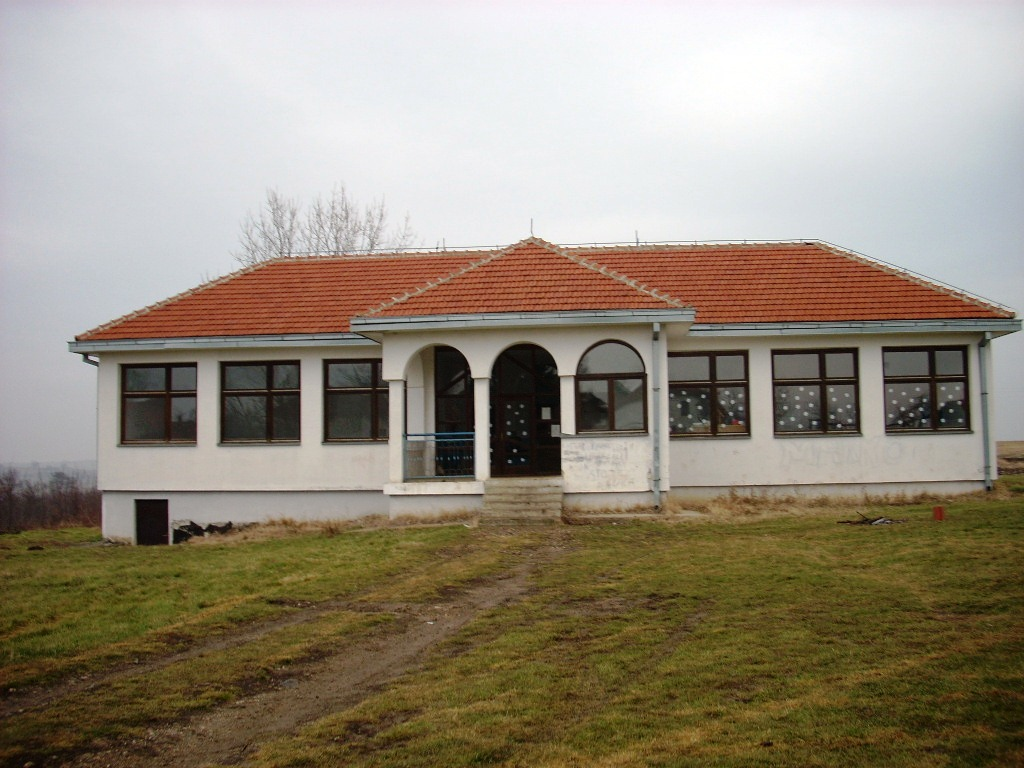

- Location within Serbia
- Coordinates: 43°03′11″N 21°44′26″E
- Country: Serbia
- District: Jablanica District
- Municipality: Bojnik

Population (2002)
  - Total: 296
- Time zone: UTC+1 (CET)
  - Summer (DST): UTC+2 (CEST)

Plavce (Serbian Cyrillic: Плавце) is a village in the municipality of Bojnik, Serbia. According to the 2002 census, the village has a population of 296 people.
