= Kosančić, Bojnik =

Kosančić Косанчић (Serbian)
- Village
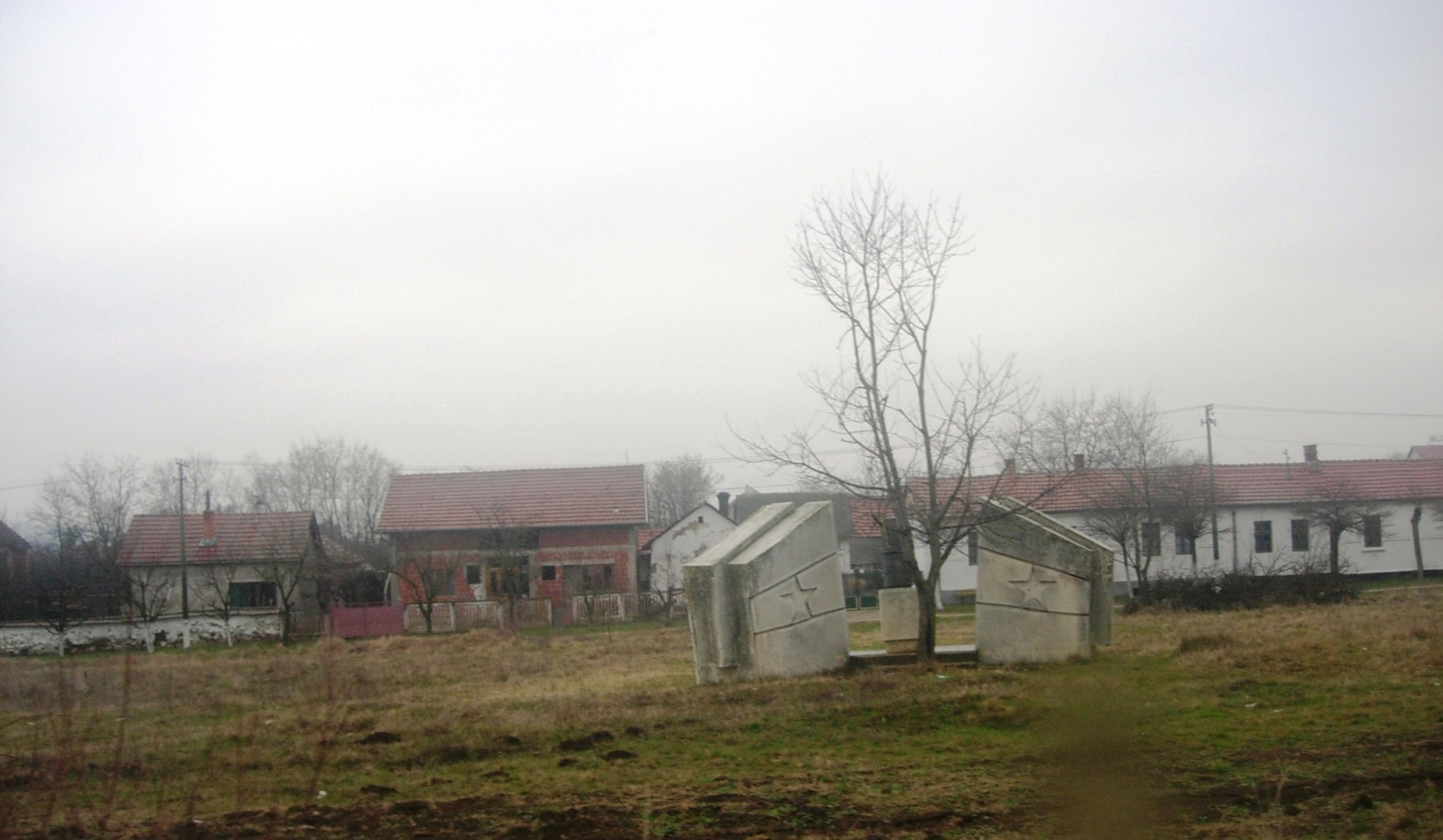

- Location within Serbia
- Coordinates: 43°05′16″N 21°47′02″E
- Country: Serbia
- District: Jablanica District
- Municipality: Bojnik

Population (2002)
  - Total: 416
- Time zone: UTC+1 (CET)
  - Summer (DST): UTC+2 (CEST)

Kosančić (Serbian Cyrillic: Косанчић) is a village in the municipality of Bojnik, Serbia. According to the 2002 census, the village has a population of 416 people. Official Slava day is St. Arhangel Mihael
