= Mrveš =

- Location within Serbia
- Coordinates: 42°58′24″N 21°43′09″E
- Country: Serbia
- Time zone: UTC+1 (CET)
  - Summer (DST): UTC+2 (CEST)

Mrveš (Serbian Cyrillic: Мрвеш) is a village in southern Serbia.

== History ==
In 1880, Mrveš was noted as an Arnaut village.
