= Ćukovac, Bojnik =

Ćukovac, Serbia Ћуковац
- Village
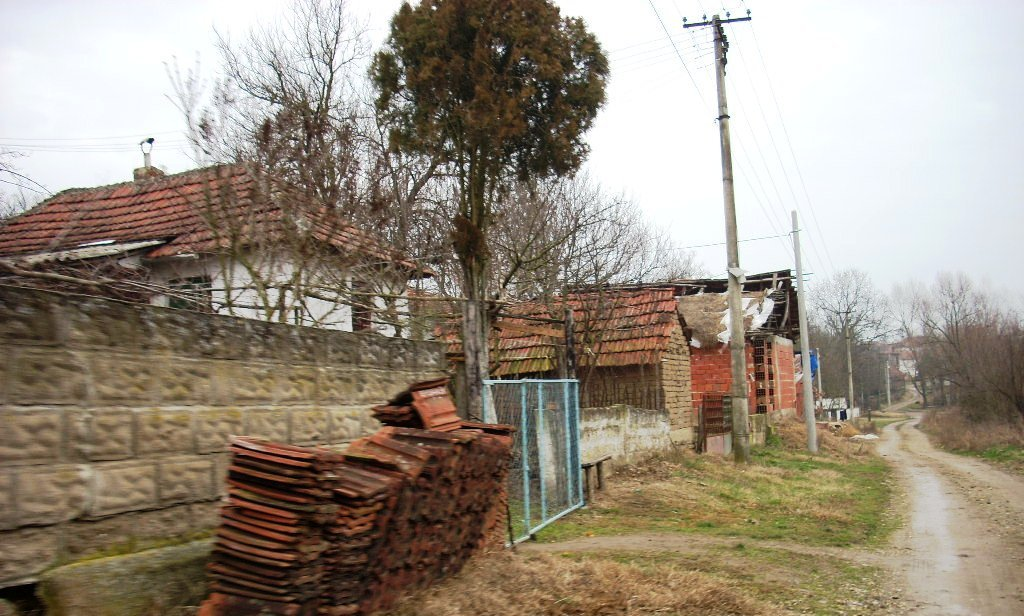
- A street in Ćukovac

- Location within Serbia
- Coordinates: 43°04′58″N 21°44′11″E
- Country: Serbia
- District: Jablanica District
- Municipality: Bojnik

Population (2002)
  - Total: 122
- Time zone: UTC+1 (CET)
  - Summer (DST): UTC+2 (CEST)

Ćukovac is a village in the municipality of Bojnik, Serbia. According to the 2002 census, the village has a population of 122 people.
