= Ćukovac, Prokuplje =

Ćukovac Ћуковац (Serbian)
- Village
- Location within Serbia
- Coordinates: 43°13′23″N 21°32′26″E
- Country: Serbia
- District: Toplica District
- Municipality: Prokuplje
- Time zone: UTC+1 (CET)
  - Summer (DST): UTC+2 (CEST)

Ćukovac is a village in the municipality of Prokuplje, Serbia. At the 2002 census, it had a population of 360.
