= Savinac (Bojnik) =

Savinac Савинац
- Village
- Location within Serbia
- Coordinates: 43°01′40″N 21°40′17″E
- Country: Serbia
- District: Jablanica District
- Municipality: Bojnik
- Time zone: UTC+1 (CET)
  - Summer (DST): UTC+2 (CEST)

Savinac (Serbian Cyrillic: Савинац) is a village in the municipality of Bojnik, Serbia. According to the 2002 census, the village has a population of 41 people.
