= Pusta Reka =

Pusta Reka may refer to:

- Pusta Reka, Kruševo, a village in North Macedonia, in municipality of Kruševo
- Pusta Reka (region), a region in Serbia, around the Pusta River (Serbian: Pusta reka)

== See also ==
- Pusta River (disambiguation)
