= Maleševo =

Maleševo or Maleshevo may refer to:

- Maleševo (Golubac), a village in municipality of Golubac, Serbia
- Maleševo (Rekovac), a village in municipality of Rekovac, Serbia
- Maleshevo Mountain (in Bulgarian) or Maleševo Mountain (in Macedonian), a mountain in Bulgaria and North Macedonia
- Maleshevo Cove

== See also ==
- Mališevo, a settlement
- Mileševo (disambiguation)
- Miloševo (disambiguation)
