= Magaš =

Magaš may refer to:

- Magaš, Serbia, a village near Bojnik
- Boris Magaš (1930–2013), Croatian architect
- Ljubomir Magaš (1948–1986), Serbian criminal of Croatian descent
- Michela Magaš, Croatian-British entrepreneur
