= Old Bridge, Bučin =

Bridge in the village of Bučin

Old Bridge
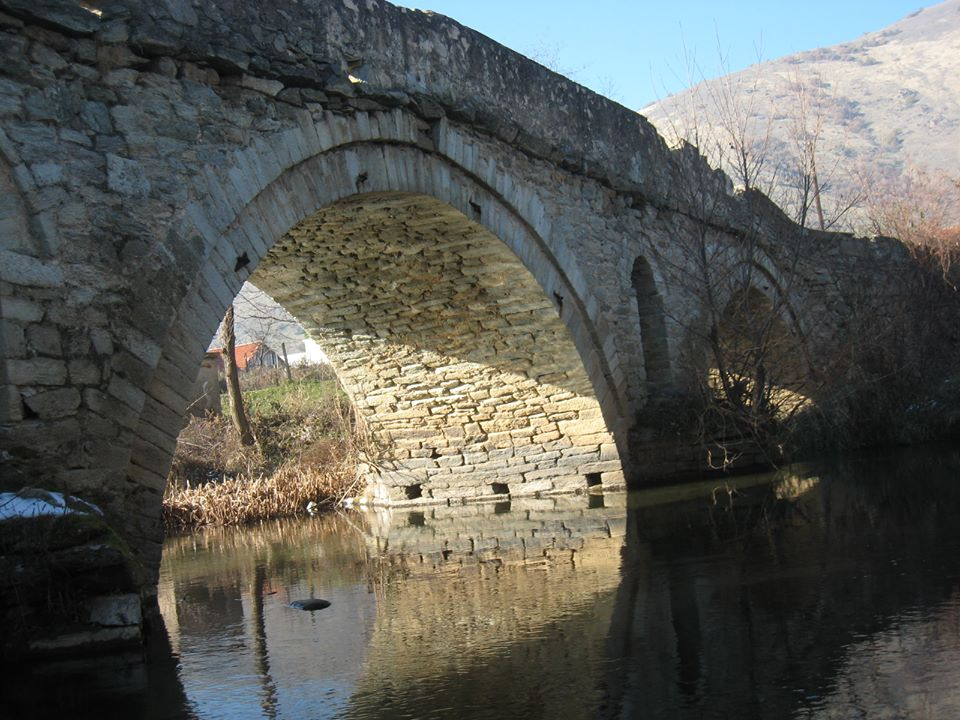
- View of the bridge
- Coordinates: 41°16′40″N 21°18′45″E
- Crosses: Crna River
- Locale: Bučin
- Official name: Bridge on the Crna Reka
- Other name: Bučin Bridge

Characteristics
- Design: arch bridge

Location
- Interactive map of Old Bridge

The Old Bridge (Macedonian: Стар мост, Star most) is a stone arch bridge that crosses Crna River in the proximity of the village of Bučin.

The bridge has been left to crumble, even though it was declared as a Cultural Heritage of North Macedonia.

== History ==
In Roman times, this bridge was built on the Crna River. Тhe bridge is considered to be a remain of a former large settlement. It is assumed that sometimes Via Egnatia passed here. Today, right next to the Old Bridge there is a newly built modern bridge.

== Architecture ==
The bridge is an arch bridge and it's built from stone.

== Gallery ==
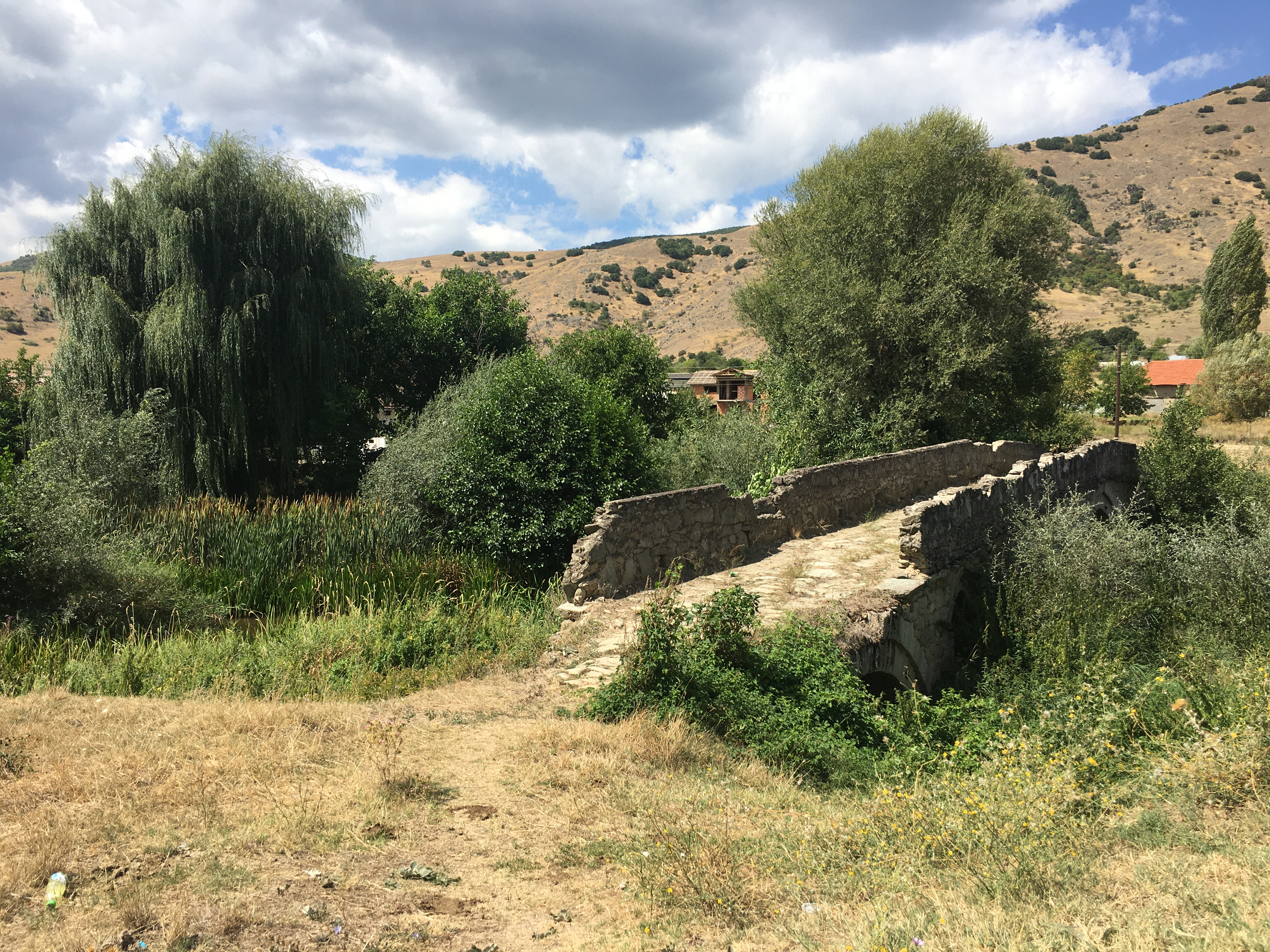
The Bridge with the surrounding area

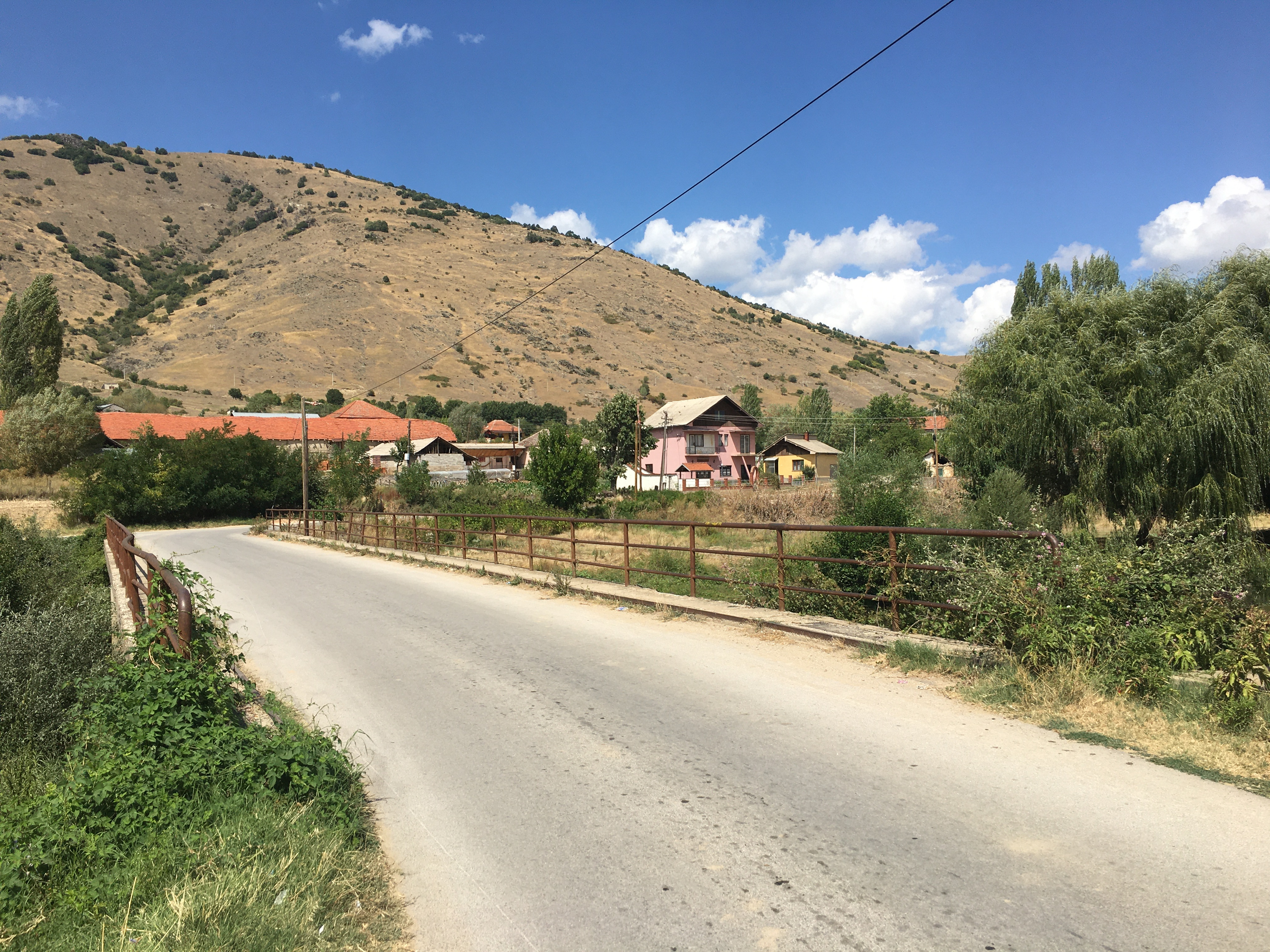
The new bridge
