= Pusta River =

Pusta River may refer to:

- Pusta River (South Morava), a river in Serbia, tributary of the South Morava
- Pusta River (Vlasina), a river in Serbia, tributary of the Vlasina
- Pusta (Crișul Negru), a river in Romania, tributary of the Crișul Negru

== See also ==
- Pusta Reka (disambiguation)
