= Crkvice =

Crkvice or Crkvica may refer to:

- Crkvice, Montenegro, a village near Kotor
- Crkvice, Bojnik, a village in Serbia
- Crkvice, Gornji Vakuf-Uskoplje, a village in Bosnia and Herzegovina
- Donje Crkvice, a village in Nikšić Municipality, Montenegro
- Gornje Crkvice, a village in Nikšić Municipality, Montenegro
- Crkvice, a city district of Zenica, Bosnia and Herzegovina
- Crkvice, a hamlet of Kuna Pelješka, Croatia
- Crkvica (island), an island near Mali Ston, Croatia
