= Bucin =

Bucin may refer to several villages:

- Bucin (Hungarian: Bucsin), a village in Joseni Commune, Harghita County, Romania
- Bucin (Bucsin), a village in Praid Commune, Harghita County, Romania
- Bučin, a village in the Kruševo district of the Republic of Macedonia
