= Dragovac =

Dragovac may refer to:

- Dragovac, Bojnik, a village in Bojnik, Serbia
- Dragovac, Požarevac, a village in Požarevac, Serbia
