= Miloševo =

Miloševo ('belonging to Miloš') may refer to the following places:

- Miloševo, Jagodina, Serbia
- Miloševo, Obiliq, Obiliq, Kosovo
- Miloševo, Negotin, Serbia
- Miloševo, Čelinac, Bosnia and Herzegovina
- Miloševo, Kruševo, North Macedonia

== See also ==
- Miloševo Brdo, Bosnia and Herzegovina
- Novo Miloševo, Serbia
- Milošević (surname), a surname
- Miloševići (disambiguation)
- Mileševo (disambiguation)
- Maleševo (disambiguation)
