= Rečica (Bojnik) =

Rečica Речица
- Village
- Location within Serbia
- Coordinates: 43°01′25″N 21°39′41″E
- Country: Serbia
- District: Jablanica District
- Municipality: Bojnik

Population (2002)
  - Total: 148
- Time zone: UTC+1 (CET)
  - Summer (DST): UTC+2 (CEST)

Rečica (Serbian Cyrillic: Речица) is a village in the municipality of Bojnik, Serbia. According to the 2002 census, the village has a population of 148 people.

The village is mentioned in the 1884 work of M. Milićević. The settlement is located in the region of Pusta Reka, and the Pusta river crosses by it.

== Sources ==
- Milićević, Milan Djuro (1884). Краљевина Србија: Ђ нови крајеви : Географија - Орографија - Хидрографија - Топографија - Аркеологија - Историја - Етнографија - Статистика - Просвета - Култура - Управа. Državna štamparija. p. 347.
