= Saždevo =

Saždevo Саждево Sazhdevë
- Village
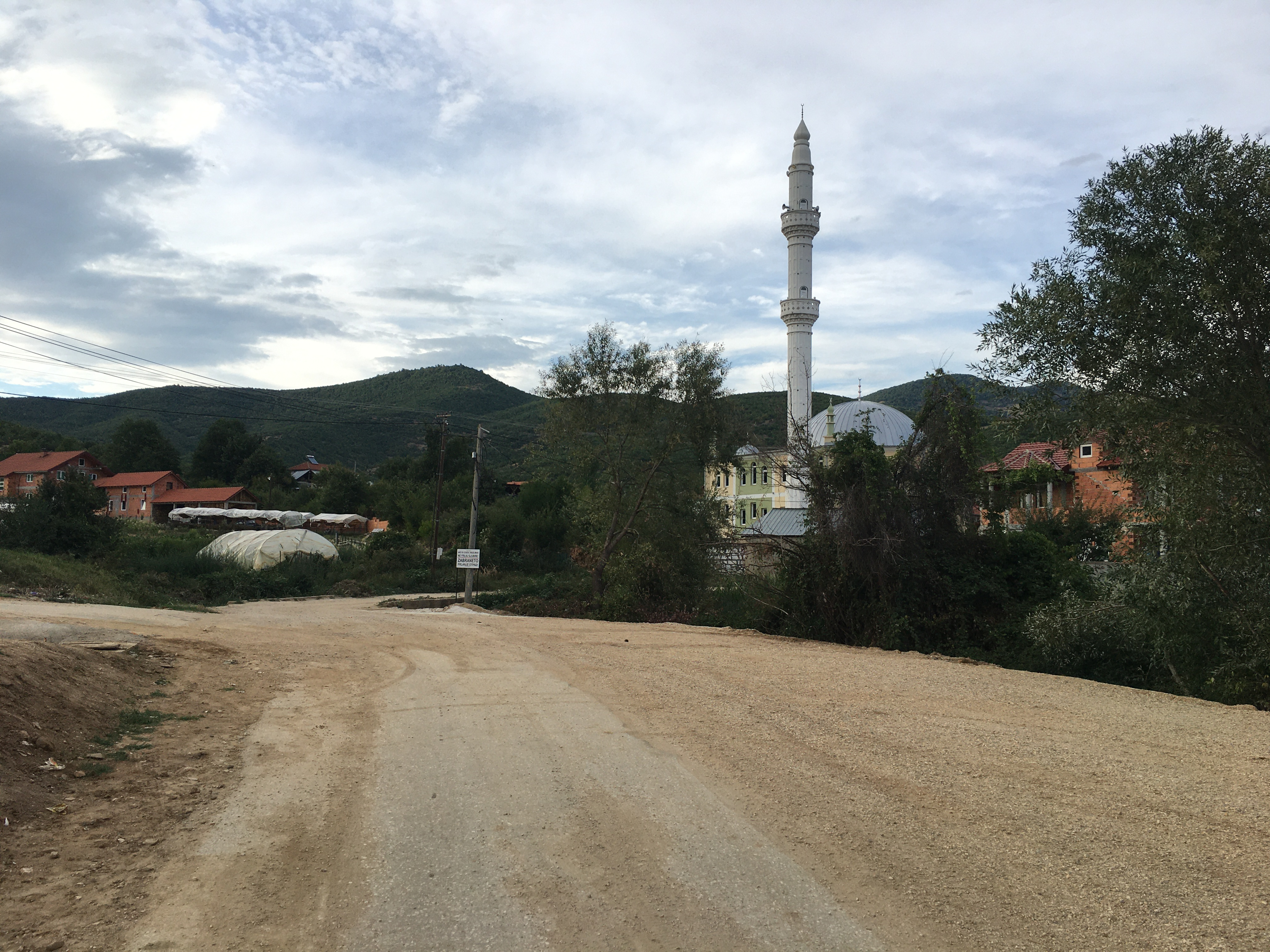
- View of the village

- Location within North Macedonia
- Coordinates: 41°27′N 21°16′E
- Country: North Macedonia
- Region: Pelagonia
- Municipality: Kruševo

Population (2021)
  - Total: 476
- Time zone: UTC+1 (CET)
  - Summer (DST): UTC+2 (CEST)
- Car plates: KS
- Website: .

Saždevo (Macedonian: Саждево, Albanian: Sazhdevë) is a village in the municipality of Kruševo, North Macedonia.

== Demographics ==
Saždevo has traditionally and exclusively been populated by Muslim Albanians.

In statistics gathered by Vasil Kanchov in 1900, the village of Saždevo was inhabited by 130 Muslim Albanians.

According to the 2021 census, the village had a total of 476 inhabitants. Ethnic groups in the village include:

- Albanians 222
- Turks 221
- Bosniaks 6
- Others 27

Year	Macedonian	Albanian	Turks	Romani	Vlachs	Serbs	Bosniaks	Others	Total
2002	...	184	207	...	...	...	...	2	393
2021	...	222	221	...	...	...	6	27	476
