= Pridvorica (Bojnik) =

- Village
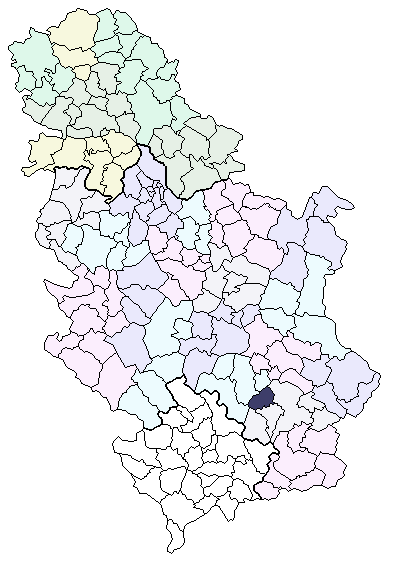
- Location of the municipality of Bojnik in Serbia

- Location within Serbia
- Coordinates: 43°00′18″N 21°45′00″E
- Country: Serbia
- District: Jablanica District
- Municipality: Bojnik

Population (2002)
  - Total: 951
- Time zone: UTC+1 (CET)
  - Summer (DST): UTC+2 (CEST)

Pridvorica (Serbian Cyrillic: Придворица) is a village in Serbia located in the municipality of Bojnik and the district of Jablanica. In 2002, it had 951 inhabitants, of which 919 were Serbs (96.63%) and 30 Romani (3.15%).

The village of Pridvorica is on the banks of the Pusta River, a tributary of the Južna Morava.
