= Borino, Kruševo =

Borino Борино Borinë
- Village
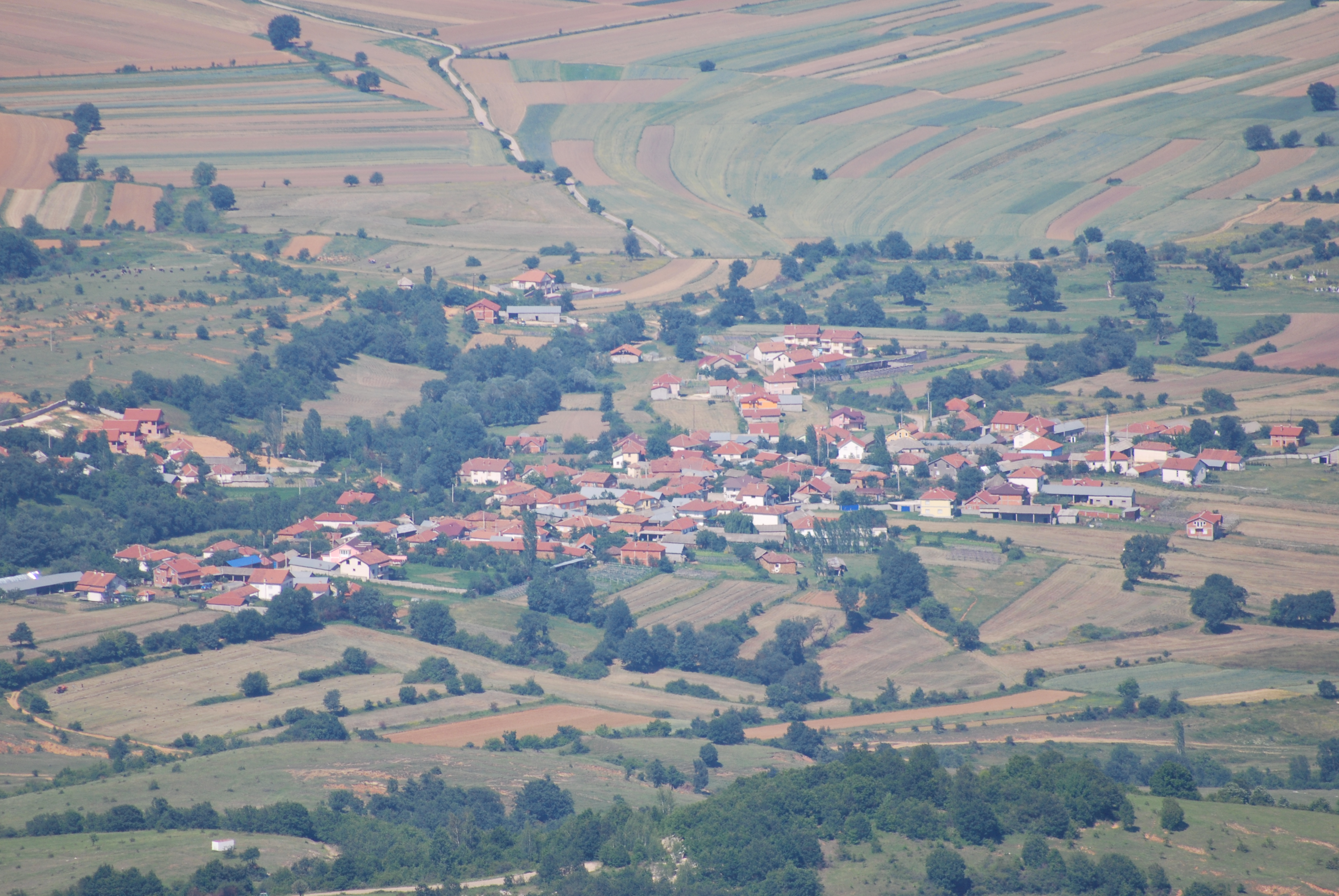
- View of the village

- Location within North Macedonia
- Coordinates: 41°26′N 21°17′E
- Country: North Macedonia
- Region: Pelagonia
- Municipality: Kruševo

Population (2021)
  - Total: 385
- Time zone: UTC+1 (CET)
  - Summer (DST): UTC+2 (CEST)
- Car plates: KS
- Website: .

Borino (Macedonian: Борино, Albanian: Borinë) is a village in the municipality of Kruševo, North Macedonia.

== Demographics ==
In the late Ottoman period, Borino was exclusively populated by Muslim Albanians.

In statistics gathered by Vasil Kanchov in 1900, the village of Borino was inhabited by 200 Muslim Albanians.

According to the 2021 census, the village had a total of 385 inhabitants. Ethnic groups in the village include:

- Albanians 313
- Bosniaks 47
- Turks 13
- Others 12

Year	Macedonian	Albanian	Turks	Romani	Vlachs	Serbs	Bosniaks	Others	Total
2002	...	340	13	...	...	...	86	...	441
2021	...	313	13	...	...	...	47	12	385
