= Lapotince =

- Village
- Location within Serbia
- Coordinates: 43°01′23″N 21°47′11″E
- Country: Serbia
- District: Jablanica District
- Municipality: Bojnik

Population (2002)
  - Total: 647
- Time zone: UTC+1 (CET)
  - Summer (DST): UTC+2 (CEST)

Lapotince (Serbian Cyrillic: Лапотинце), formerly Lopatnica, is a village in the municipality of Bojnik, Serbia. The village lays in the Pusta Reka region, by the Pusta River.

The village is mentioned as Lopatnica in the 1884 work of M. Milićević. The settlement is located in the region of Pusta Reka, and the Pusta river crosses by it.

== Demographics ==
According to the 2002 census, the village had a population of 647 people.

== Sources ==
- Milićević, Milan Djuro (1884). Краљевина Србија: Ђ нови крајеви : Географија - Орографија - Хидрографија - Топографија - Аркеологија - Историја - Етнографија - Статистика - Просвета - Култура - Управа. Državna štamparija. p. 347.
