= Vrboec =

Village in North Macedonia

Vrboec Врбоец
- Village
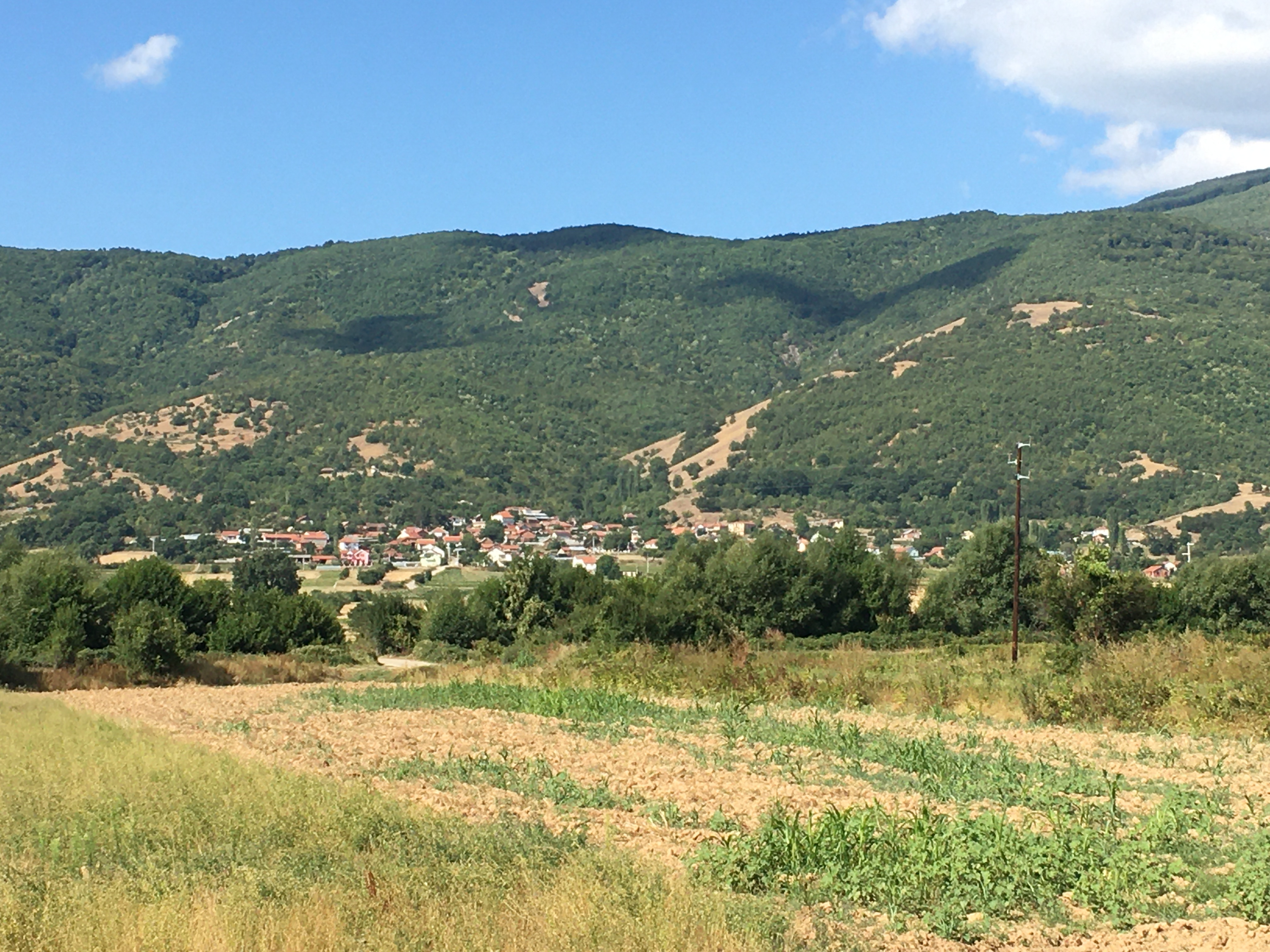
- View of the village

- Location within North Macedonia
- Coordinates: 41.336465°N 21.297257°E
- Country: North Macedonia
- Region: Pelagonia
- Municipality: Kruševo

Population (2021)
  - Total: 227
- Time zone: UTC+1 (CET)
  - Summer (DST): UTC+2 (CEST)

Vrboec is a village in Krushevo Municipality, in the vicinity of the city of Krushevo, North Macedonia.

== Population ==
On the Ethnographic Map of Bitola Vilayet from 1901, Vrbovec is listed as a purely Turkish village in the Prilep kaza of the Bitola Sandzak with 42 houses. According to Dimitar Gadzhanov, in 1916 there were 250 Turks in Vrboec. According to a German map published in 1941, based on the 1931 census of the Kingdom of Yugoslavia, the village had 150 Macedonians. Vrboec is a medium-sized village, without major population changes. In 1961, the village had 352 inhabitants, and in 1994 the number decreased to 288 inhabitants, Macedonian population. According to the 2002 census, the village of Vrboec had 256 inhabitants, of whom 255 were Macedonians. According to the last census of 2021, the village had 227 inhabitants, all Macedonians.
