= Presil =

Presil Пресил Presillë
- Village
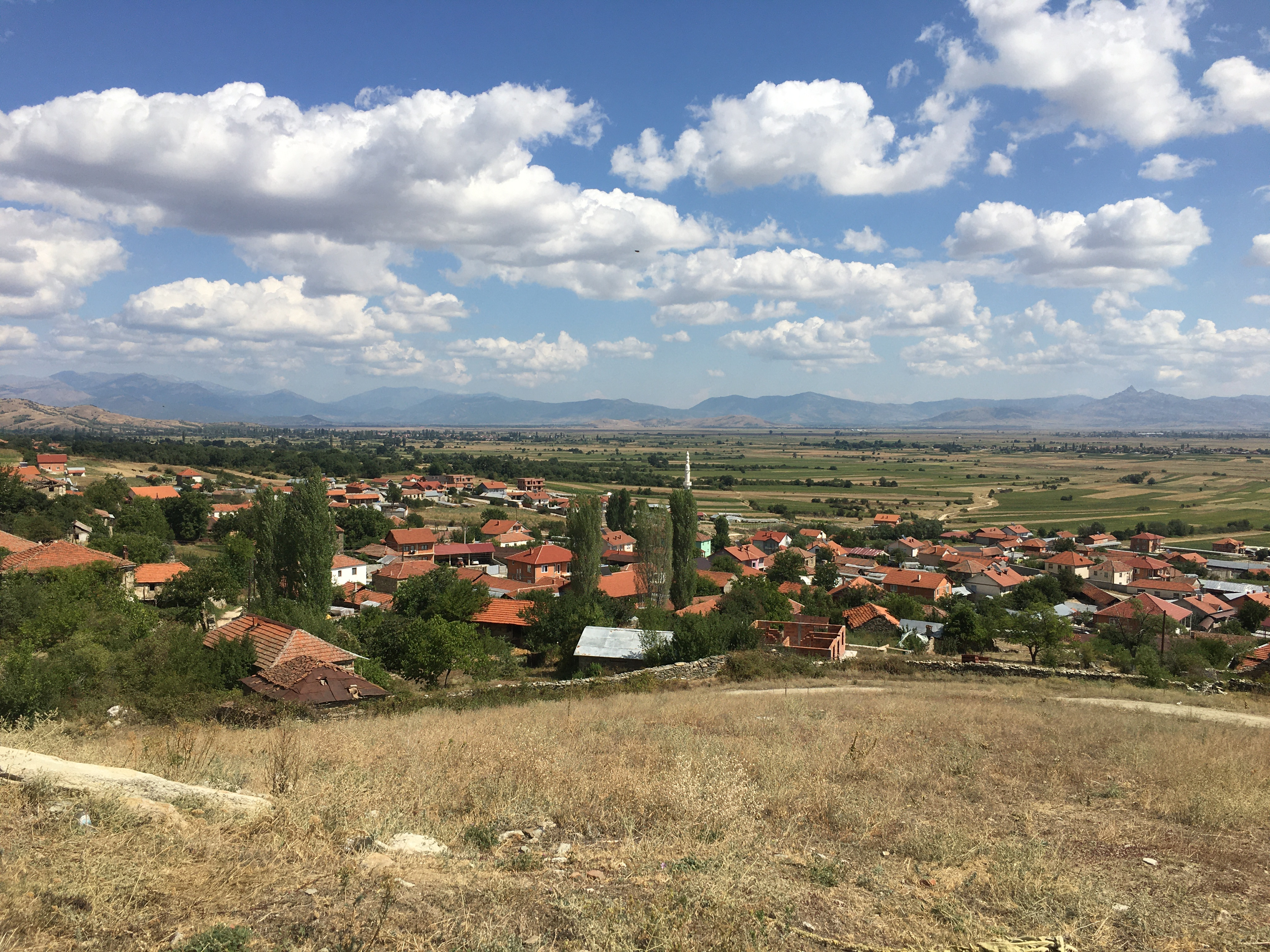
- View of the village

- Location within North Macedonia
- Coordinates: 41°18′N 21°19′E
- Country: North Macedonia
- Region: Pelagonia
- Municipality: Kruševo

Population (2021)
  - Total: 574
- Time zone: UTC+1 (CET)
  - Summer (DST): UTC+2 (CEST)
- Car plates: BT
- Website: .

Presil (Macedonian: Пресил, Albanian: Presillë) is a village in the municipality of Kruševo, North Macedonia.

== Demographics ==
Presil is attested in the Ottoman defter of 1467/68 as a village in the vilayet of Manastir. The majority of the inhabitants attested bore typical Albanian anthroponyms.

According to the 2021 census, the village had a total of 574 inhabitants. Ethnic groups in the village include:

- Albanians 529
- Turks 1
- Macedonians 42
- Others 2

Year	Macedonian	Albanian	Turks	Romani	Vlachs	Serbs	Bosniaks	Others	Total
2002	23	392	29	...	...	...	...	...	444
2021	42	529	1	...	...	...	...	2	574

== Sports ==
It is home to the football club KF Vëllazërimi Presillë.
