= Donje Brijanje =

- Village
- Location within Serbia
- Coordinates: 43°06′03″N 21°49′06″E
- Country: Serbia
- District: Jablanica District
- Municipality: Leskovac

Population (2002)
  - Total: 1,487
- Time zone: UTC+1 (CET)
  - Summer (DST): UTC+2 (CEST)

Donje Brijanje is a village in the municipality of Leskovac, Serbia. According to the 2002 census, the village has a population of 1487 people. The neighbouring village of Gornje Brijanje is administratively part of Bojnik.

The village is mentioned in the 1884 work of M. Milićević. The settlement is located in the region of Pusta Reka, and the Pusta river crosses by it.

== Sources ==
- Milićević, Milan Djuro (1884). Краљевина Србија: Ђ нови крајеви : Географија - Орографија - Хидрографија - Топографија - Аркеологија - Историја - Етнографија - Статистика - Просвета - Култура - Управа. Državna štamparija. p. 347.
