= Jakrenovo =

Jakrenovo Јакреново Jakrenovë
- Village
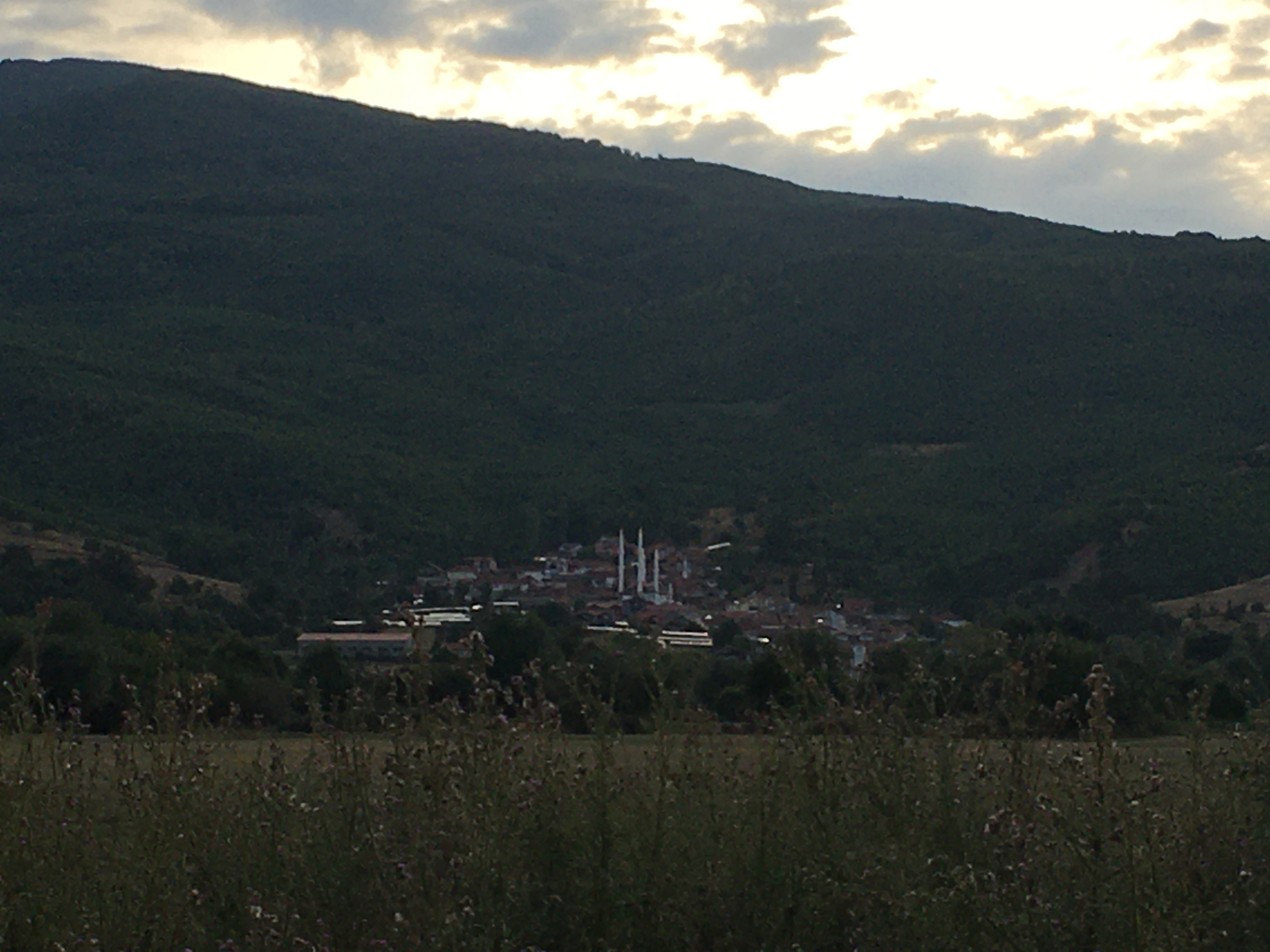
- View of the village

- Location within North Macedonia
- Coordinates: 41°27′N 21°16′E
- Country: North Macedonia
- Region: Pelagonia
- Municipality: Kruševo

Population (2021)
  - Total: 276
- Time zone: UTC+1 (CET)
  - Summer (DST): UTC+2 (CEST)
- Car plates: KS
- Website: .

Jakrenovo (Macedonian: Јакреново, Albanian: Jakrenovë) is a village in the municipality of Kruševo, North Macedonia.

== Demographics ==
Jakrenovo has traditionally and exclusively been populated by Muslim Albanians.

In statistics gathered by Vasil Kanchov in 1900, the village of Jakrenovo was inhabited by 30 Christian Bulgarians and 100 Muslim Albanians.

According to the 2021 census, the village had a total of 276 inhabitants. Ethnic groups in the village include:

- Albanians 146
- Turks 48
- Bosniaks 54
- Others 28

Year	Macedonian	Albanian	Turks	Romani	Vlachs	Serbs	Bosniaks	Others	Total
2002	...	100	59	...	...	...	51	2	212
2021	...	146	48	...	...	...	54	28	276
