= Dolno Divjaci =

Dolno Divjaci Dolno Divjaci
- Village
- Location within North Macedonia
- Coordinates: 41°22′N 21°18′E
- Country: North Macedonia
- Region: Pelagonia
- Municipality: Kruševo

Population (2021)
  - Total: 27
- Time zone: UTC+1 (CET)
  - Summer (DST): UTC+2 (CEST)
- Car plates: KŠ
- Website: .

Dolno Divjaci (Macedonian: Dolno Divjaci) is a village in the municipality of Kruševo, North Macedonia.

== Demographics ==
According to the 2021 census, the village had a total of 27 inhabitants. Ethnic groups in the village include:

- Macedonians 25
- Others 2

| Year | Macedonian | Albanian | Turks | Romani | Aromanians | Serbs | Bosniaks | Others | Total |
|---|---|---|---|---|---|---|---|---|---|
| 2002 | 59 | ... | ... | ... | ... | ... | ... | ... | 59 |
| 2021 | 25 | ... | ... | ... | ... | ... | ... | 2 | 27 |
