= Arilevo =

Arilevo Arilevo
- Village
- Location within North Macedonia
- Coordinates: 41°22′N 21°18′E
- Country: North Macedonia
- Region: Pelagonia
- Municipality: Kruševo

Population (2021)
  - Total: 2
- Time zone: UTC+1 (CET)
  - Summer (DST): UTC+2 (CEST)
- Car plates: KŠ
- Website: .

Arilevo (Macedonian: Arilevo) is a village in the municipality of Kruševo, North Macedonia.

== Demographics ==
According to the 2021 census, the village had a total of 2 inhabitants. Ethnic groups in the village include:

- Macedonians 2

Year	Macedonian	Albanian	Turks	Romani	Aromanians	Serbs	Bosniaks	Others	Total
2002	13	...	...	...	...	...	...	...	13
2021	2	...	...	...	...	...	...	...	2
