= Norovo =

Norovo Норово Norovë
- Village
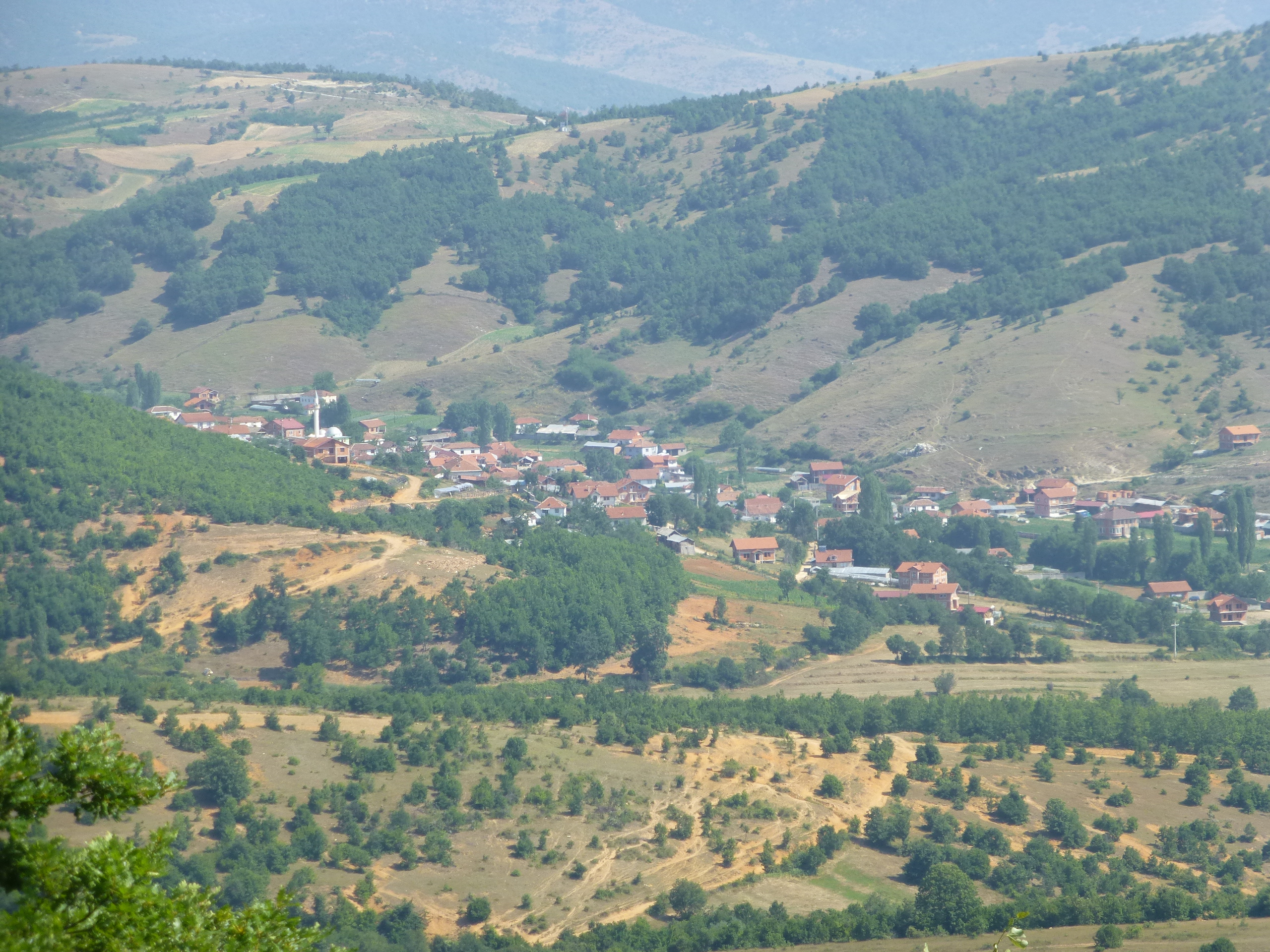
- Norovo

- Location within North Macedonia
- Coordinates: 41°24′N 21°17′E
- Country: North Macedonia
- Region: Pelagonia
- Municipality: Kruševo

Population (2021)
  - Total: 770
- Time zone: UTC+1 (CET)
  - Summer (DST): UTC+2 (CEST)
- Car plates: KS
- Website: .

Norovo (Macedonian: Норово, Albanian: Norovë) is a village in the municipality of Kruševo, North Macedonia.

== Demographics ==
Norovo has traditionally and exclusively been populated by Muslim Albanians.

According to the 2021 census, the village had a total of 770 inhabitants. Ethnic groups in the village include:

- Albanians 725
- Others 45

Year	Macedonian	Albanian	Turks	Romani	Vlachs	Serbs	Bosniaks	Others	Total
2002	1	589	...	...	...	...	...	9	599
2021	...	725	...	...	...	...	...	45	770
