= Kruševo Municipality =

Municipality of North Macedonia

Coordinates: 41.14°N 21.26°E

Kruševo Municipality Општина Крушево (Macedonian) Komuna e Krushevës (Albanian)
- Urban municipality
- Оштина Крушево
- Flag Coat of arms

- Country: North Macedonia
- Region: Pelagonia
- Municipal seat: Kruševo

Government
  - Mayor: Tome Hristoski (SDSM)

Area
  - Total: 190.68 km^{2} (73.62 sq mi)

Population
  - Total: 8,385
  - Density: 51/km^{2} (130/sq mi)
- Time zone: UTC+1 (CET)
- Postal code: 7550
- Area code: 48
- Vehicle registration: KS

Kruševo Municipality (Macedonian: Крушево [ˈkruʃɛvɔ]; Albanian: Krushevë) is a municipality in the central region of North Macedonia. Kruševo is also the name of the town where the municipal seat is found. This municipality is part of the Pelagonia Statistical Region.

== Geography ==
The municipality borders Plasnica Municipality to the northwest, Makedonski Brod Municipality to the north, Dolneni Municipality and Krivogaštani Municipality to the east, Mogila Municipality to the south, and Demir Hisar Municipality and Kičevo Municipality to the west.

== Demographics ==
Besides Macedonians, the municipality of Kruševo also contains a Muslim Albanian population living in the region. In the modern era relations between Kruševo Aromanians and Muslim Albanians remain cordial, as do relations of Kruševo's Christian inhabitants with Muslim villagers of the municipality when they arrive into town to conduct business on market day and attend to administrative tasks. In 1996 the creation of Žitoše municipality (now part of Dolneni Municipality) reduced some of Kruševo Municipality's religious and linguistic diversity as the new municipal unit included a sizable number of Muslim Albanians.

According to the 2021 North Macedonia census, this municipality has 8,385 inhabitants. Ethnic groups in the municipality include:

	2002		2021	
	Number	%	Number	%
TOTAL	9,684	100	8,385	100
Macedonians	6,081	62.79	4,316	51.47
Albanians	2,064	21.31	2,464	29.39
Vlachs	1,020	10.53	867	10.34
Turks	315	3.25	283	3.38
Bosniaks	137	1.41	108	1.29
Serbs	38	0.39	10	0.12
Other / Undeclared / Unknown	29	0.32	35	0.41
Persons for whom data are taken from administrative sources			302	3.6

- Religious affiliation according to the 2002 Macedonia census and 2021 North Macedonia census:

	2002		2021	
	Number	%	Number	%
TOTAL	9,684	100	8,385	100
Orthodox	7,096	73.3	3,351	62.1
Christians	/	/	1,843	62.1
Catholics	3	0.03	11	62.1
Islam	2,514	26.0	2,859	34.1
Others	71	0.73	19	0.23
Persons for whom data are taken from administrative sources	n/a	n/a	302	3.60

- Demographic Trends Live births by ethnic affiliation of mother, 2010-2021

	Macedonians		Albanians		Turks		Vlachs		Roma		Bosniaks		Others		TOTAL
Year	Births	%	Births	%	Births	%	Births	%	Births	%	Births	%	Births	%	Births
2010	52	46.43	44	39.29	10	8.93	1	0.89	0	0.00	1	0.89	4	3.57	112
2011	40	41.24	42	43.30	4	4.12	2	2.06	2	2.06	3	3.09	4	4.12	97
2012	34	31.48	55	50.93	12	11.1	2	1.85	3	2.78	0	0.00	2	1.85	108
2013	55	42.64	55	42.64	13	10.1	0	0.00	0	0.00	3	2.33	3	2.33	129
2014	43	42.16	48	47.06	3	2.94	1	0.98	3	2.94	2	1.96	2	1.96	102
2015	45	39.13	38	33.04	20	17.4	8	6.96	2	1.74	1	0.87	1	0.87	115
2016	41	41.41	47	47.47	4	4.04	2	2.02	1	1.01	3	3.03	1	1.01	99
2017	34	38.64	36	40.91	11	12.5	2	2.27	3	3.41	1	1.14	1	1.14	88
2018	38	43.68	40	45.98	4	4.60	3	3.45	0	0.00	2	2.30	0	0.00	87
2019	29	34.52	40	47.62	10	11.9	3	3.57	1	1.19	1	1.19	0	0.00	84
2020	42	40.78	52	50.49	2	1.94	2	1.94	2	1.94	2	1.94	1	0.97	103
2021	24	34.29	36	51.43	4	5.71	2	2.86	0	0.00	2	2.86	2	2.86	70
2022	29	40.27	37	51.39	3	4.17	1	1.39	1	1.39	0	0.00	1	1.39	72
2023	29	39.73	37	50.68	3	4.11	1	1.37	0	0.00	3	4.11	0	0.00	73

== Inhabited places ==
There are 18 inhabited places in this municipality.

Inhabited Places	Total	Macedonians	Albanians	Turks	Roma	Vlachs	Serbs	Bosniaks	Others
Kruševo Municipality	8,385	4,316	2,464	283	-	867	-	-	455
Aldanci	442	5	429	-	-	-	-	-	8
Arilevo	2	2	-	-	-	-	-	-	-
Belušino	92	-	91	-	-	-	-	-	1
Birino	0	-	-	-	-	-	-	-	-
Borino	385	-	313	13	-	-	-	47	12
Bučin	522	502	-	-	-	1	-	-	19
Dolno Divjaci	27	25	-	-	-	-	-	-	2
Gorno Divjaci	11	11	-	-	-	-	-	-	-
Jakrenovo	276	-	146	48	-	-	-	54	28
Kruševo	4,104	3,053	9	-	-	866	10	1	165
Miloševo	42	42	-	-	-	-	-	-	-
Norovo	770	-	725	-	-	-	-	-	45
Ostrilci	19	19	-	-	-	-	-	-	-
Presil	574	42	529	1	-	-	-	-	2
Pusta Reka	53	46	-	-	-	-	-	-	7
Saždevo	476	-	222	221	-	-	-	6	27
Selce	6	6	-	-	-	-	-	-	-
Sveto Mitrani	357	336	-	-	-	-	-	-	21
Vrboec	227	227	-	-	-	-	-	-	-

== Education ==
Education in the Municipality is organized in 2 elementary schools and 1 high school:

- Elementary School "Nikola Karev"
- Elementary School "Cyril and Methodius"
- High School "Naum Naumovski - Borce"

During the school year 2018/2019, 750 students attended elementary school in the territory of Municipality, of which 366 Albanians, 321 Macedonians, 57 Aromanians and 6 others.
