= Sveto Mitrani =

Sveto Mitrani Свето Митрани
- Village
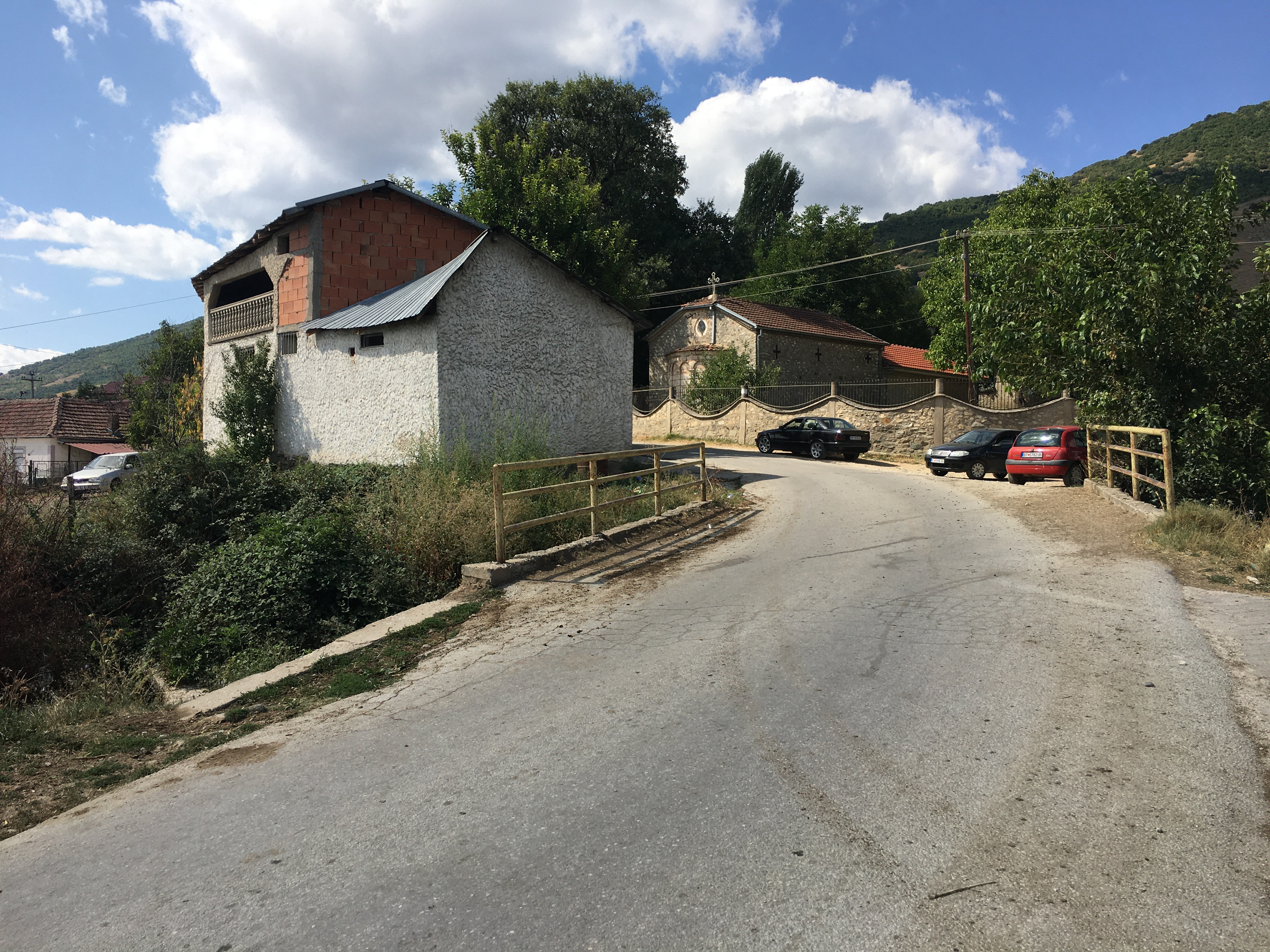
- View of the village

- Location within North Macedonia
- Coordinates: 41.321897°N 21.305498°E
- Country: North Macedonia
- Region: Pelagonia
- Municipality: Kruševo

Population (2021)
  - Total: 357
- Time zone: UTC+1 (CET)
  - Summer (DST): UTC+2 (CEST)
- Website: .

Sveto Mitrani (Macedonian: Свето Митрани) is a village in the municipality of Kruševo, North Macedonia.

== Demographics ==
According to the 2021 census, the village had a total of 357 inhabitants. Ethnic groups in the village include:

- Macedonians 336
- Others 21

Year	Macedonian	Albanian	Turks	Romani	Vlachs	Serbs	Bosniaks	Others	Persons for whom data are taken from admin. sources	Total
2002	433	...	...	...	...	...	...	1	n/a	434
2021	336	...	...	...	...	...	...	...	21	357
