= Gorno Divjaci =

Gorno Divjaci Gorno Divjaci
- Village
- Location within North Macedonia
- Coordinates: 41°22′N 21°18′E
- Country: North Macedonia
- Region: Pelagonia
- Municipality: Kruševo

Population (2021)
  - Total: 11
- Time zone: UTC+1 (CET)
  - Summer (DST): UTC+2 (CEST)
- Car plates: KŠ
- Website: .

Gorno Divjaci (Macedonian: Gorno Divjaci) is a village in the municipality of Kruševo, North Macedonia.

== Demographics ==
According to the 2021 census, the village had a total of 11 inhabitants. Ethnic groups in the village include:

- Macedonians 11

Year	Macedonian	Albanian	Turks	Romani	Aromanians	Serbs	Bosniaks	Others	Total
2002	46	...	...	...	...	...	...	...	46
2021	11	...	...	...	...	...	...	...	11
