= Đinđuša =

Đinđuša Ђинђуша (Serbian)
- Village
- Location within Serbia
- Coordinates: 43°04′20″N 21°47′10″E
- Country: Serbia
- District: Jablanica District
- Municipality: Bojnik

Population (2002)
  - Total: 675
- Time zone: UTC+1 (CET)
  - Summer (DST): UTC+2 (CEST)

Đinđuša (Serbian Cyrillic: Ђинђуша) is a village in the municipality of Bojnik, Serbia. According to the 2002 census, the village has a population of 675 people.

The village is mentioned in the 1884 work of M. Milićević. The settlement is located in the region of Pusta Reka, and the Pusta river crosses by it.

== Gallery ==
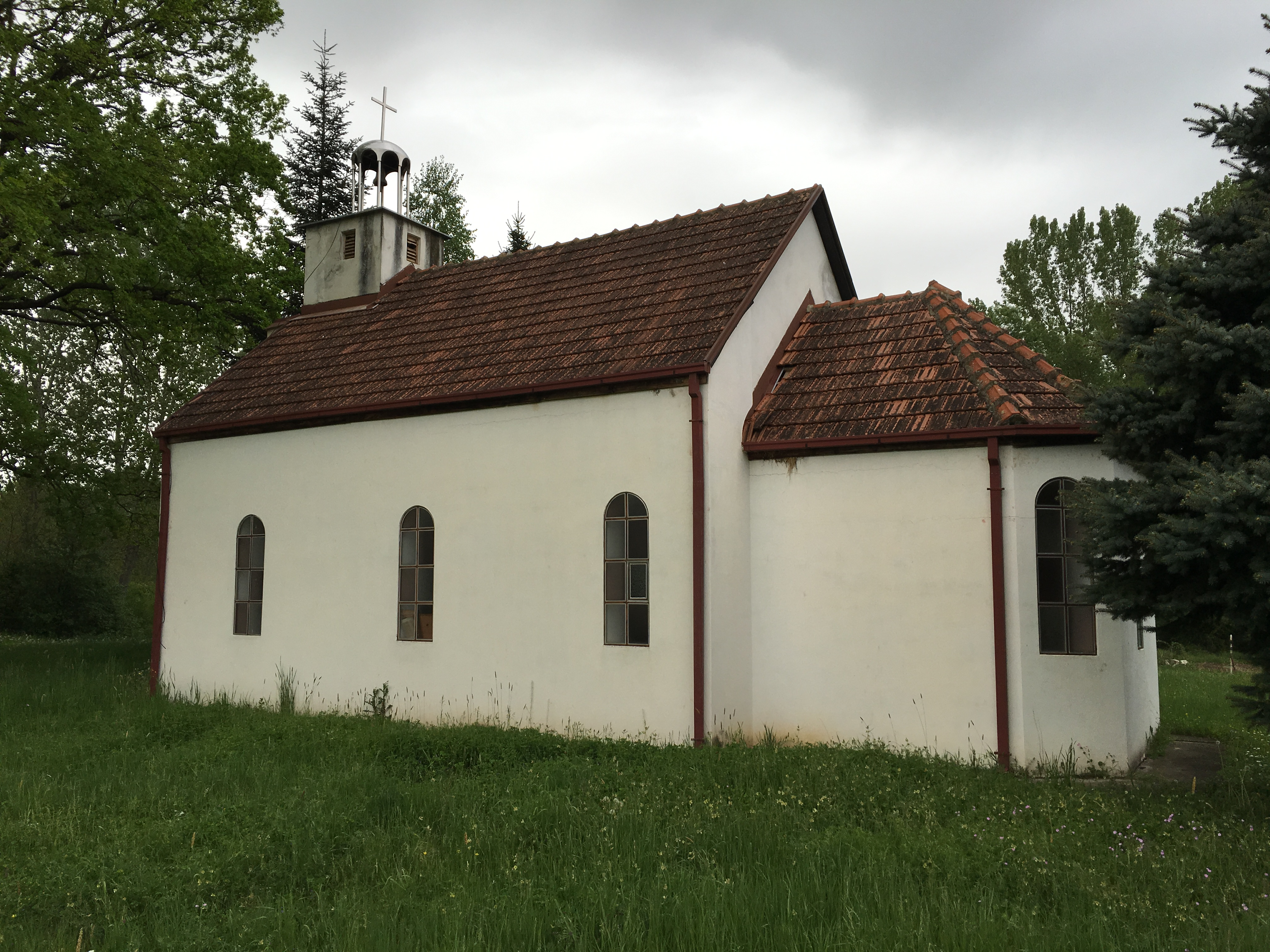
Orthodox church.

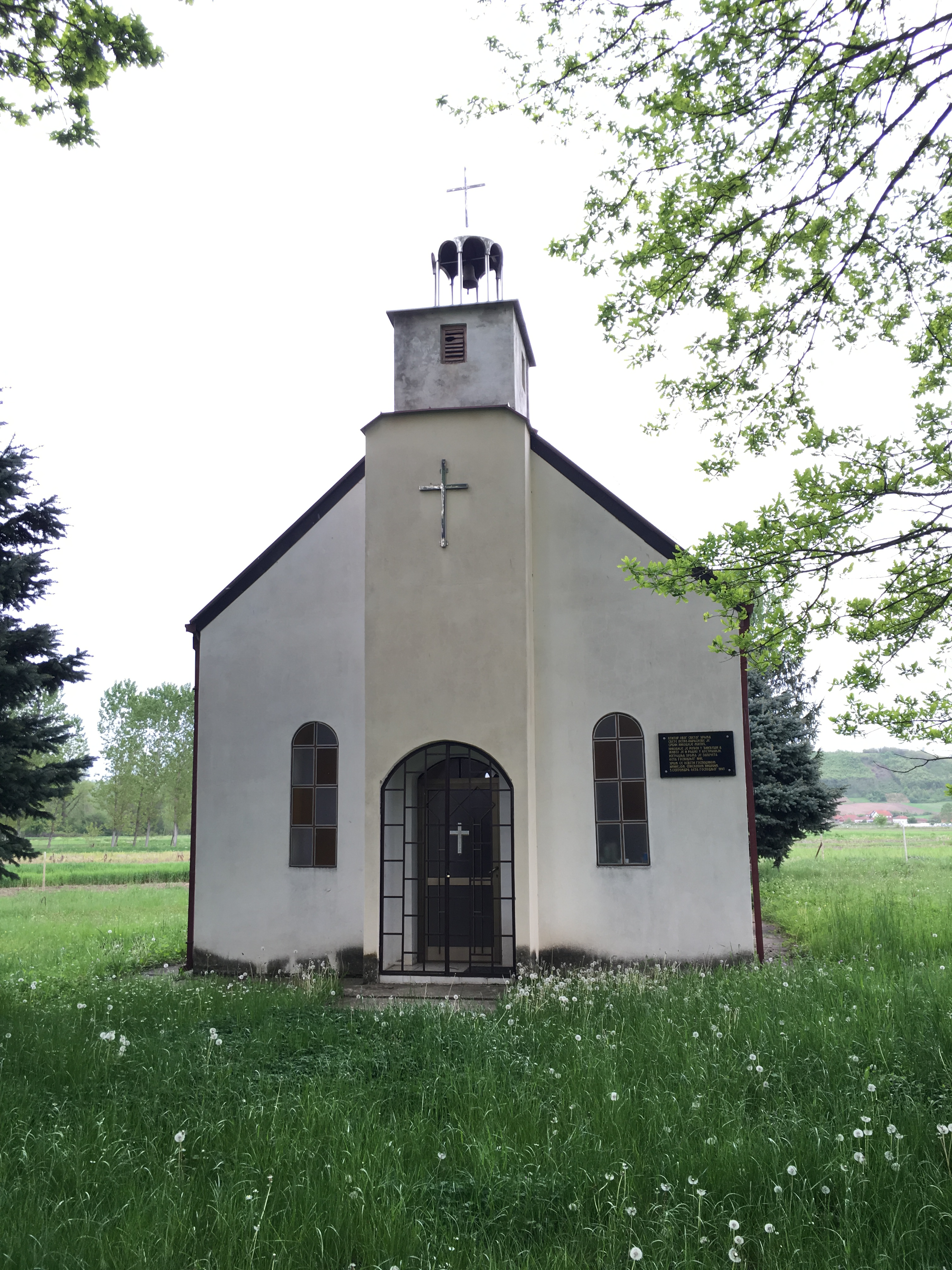
Orthodox church.

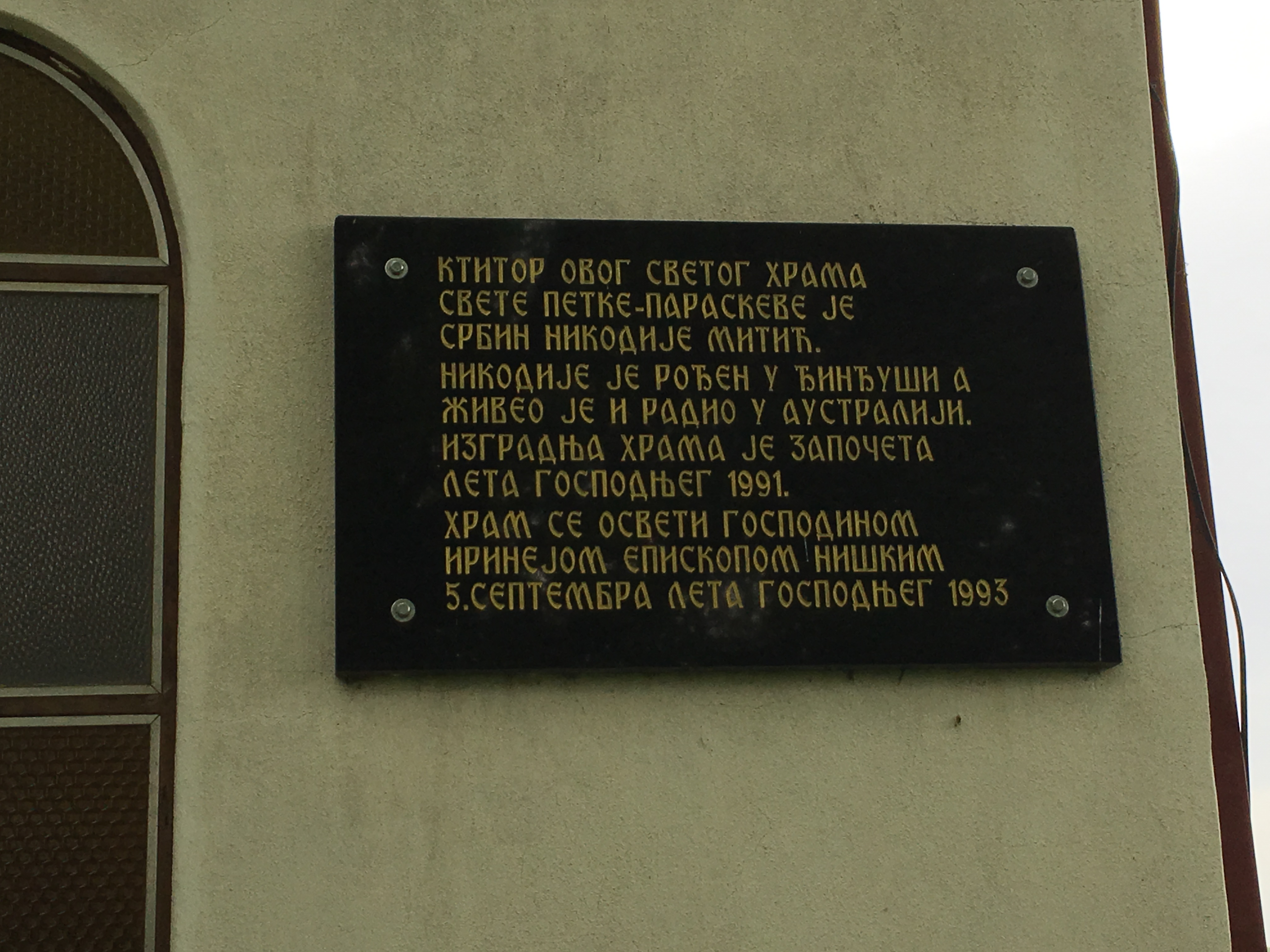
Orthodox church.

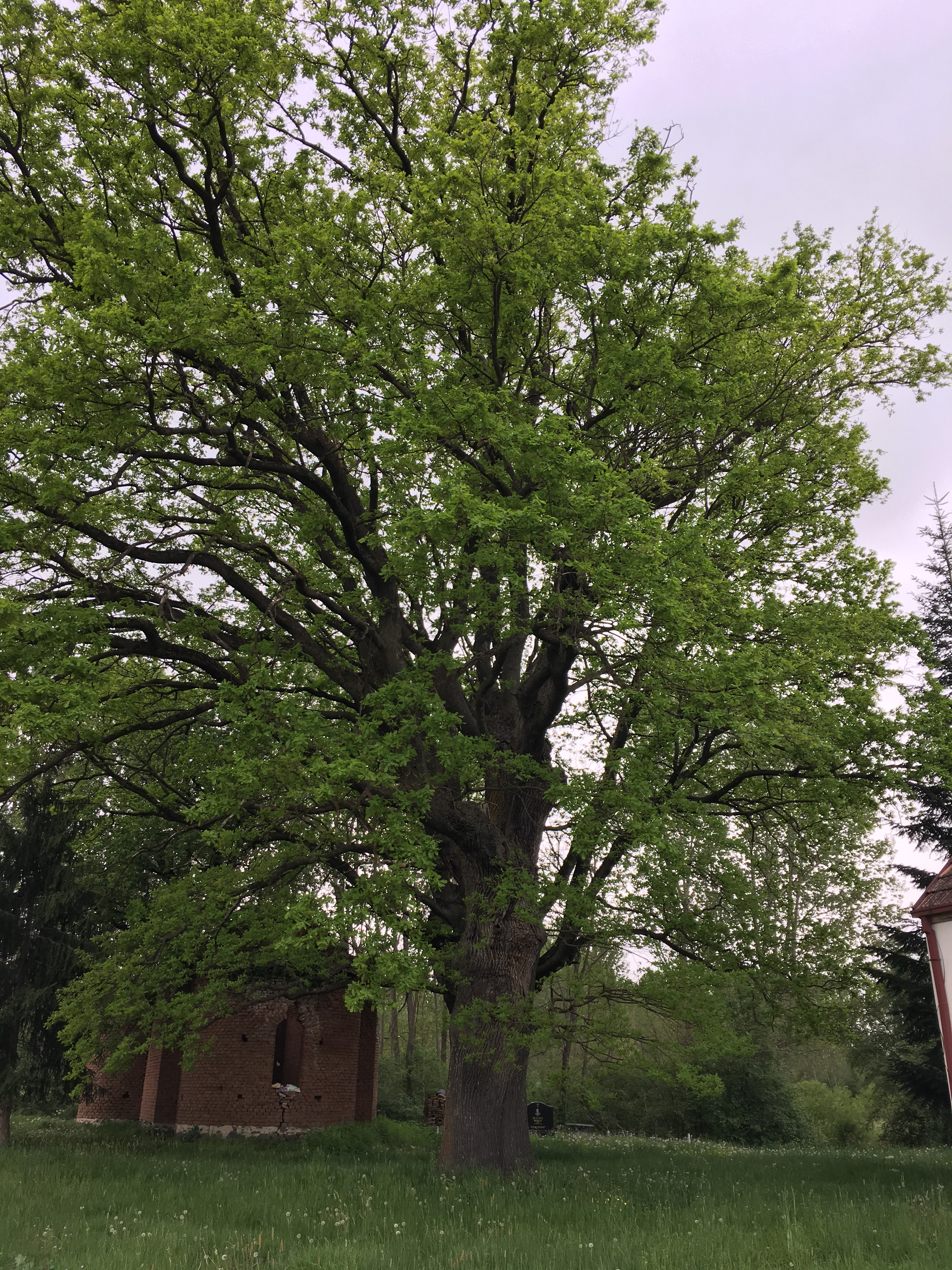
Church yard.

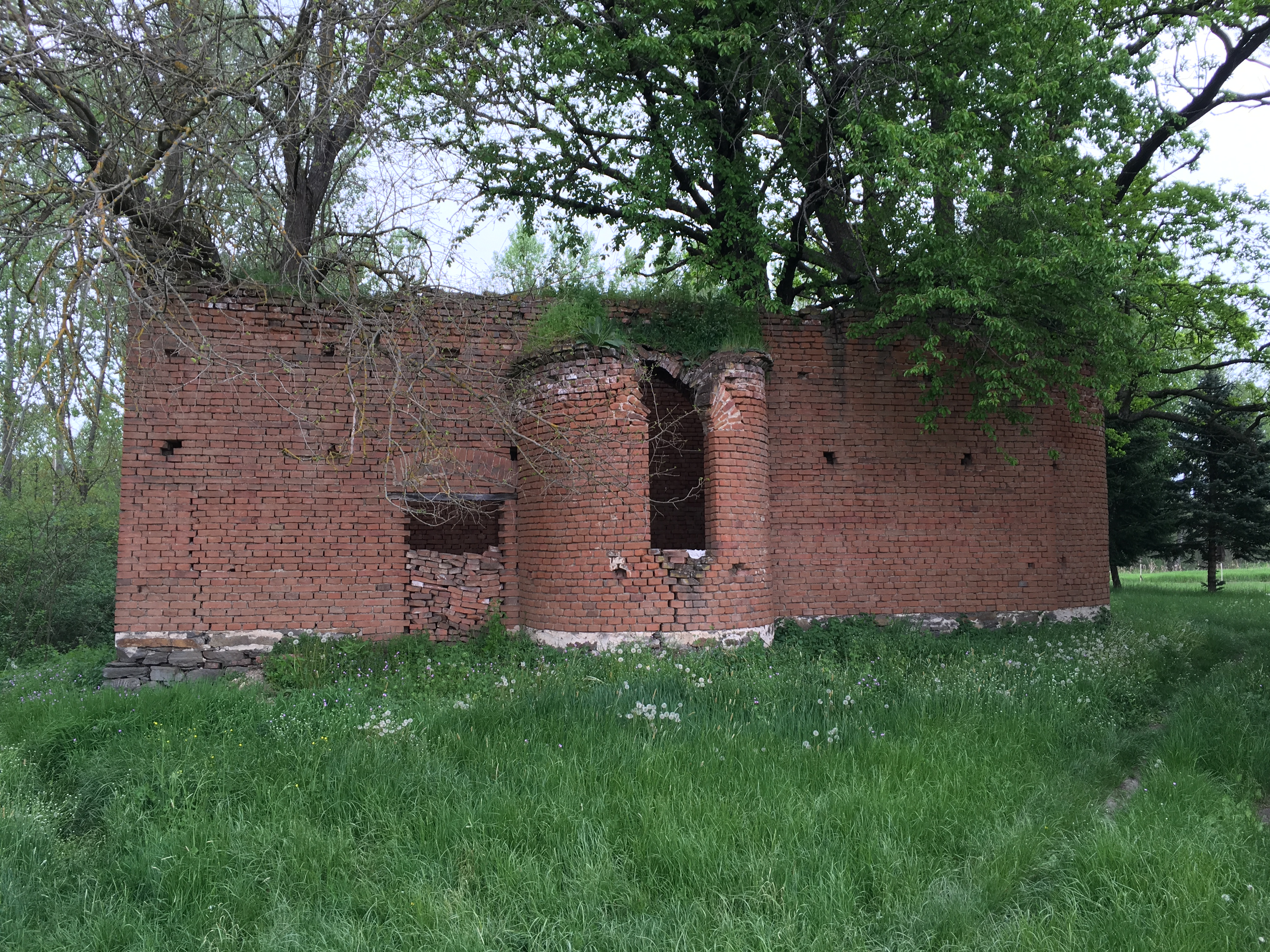
Churchyard.

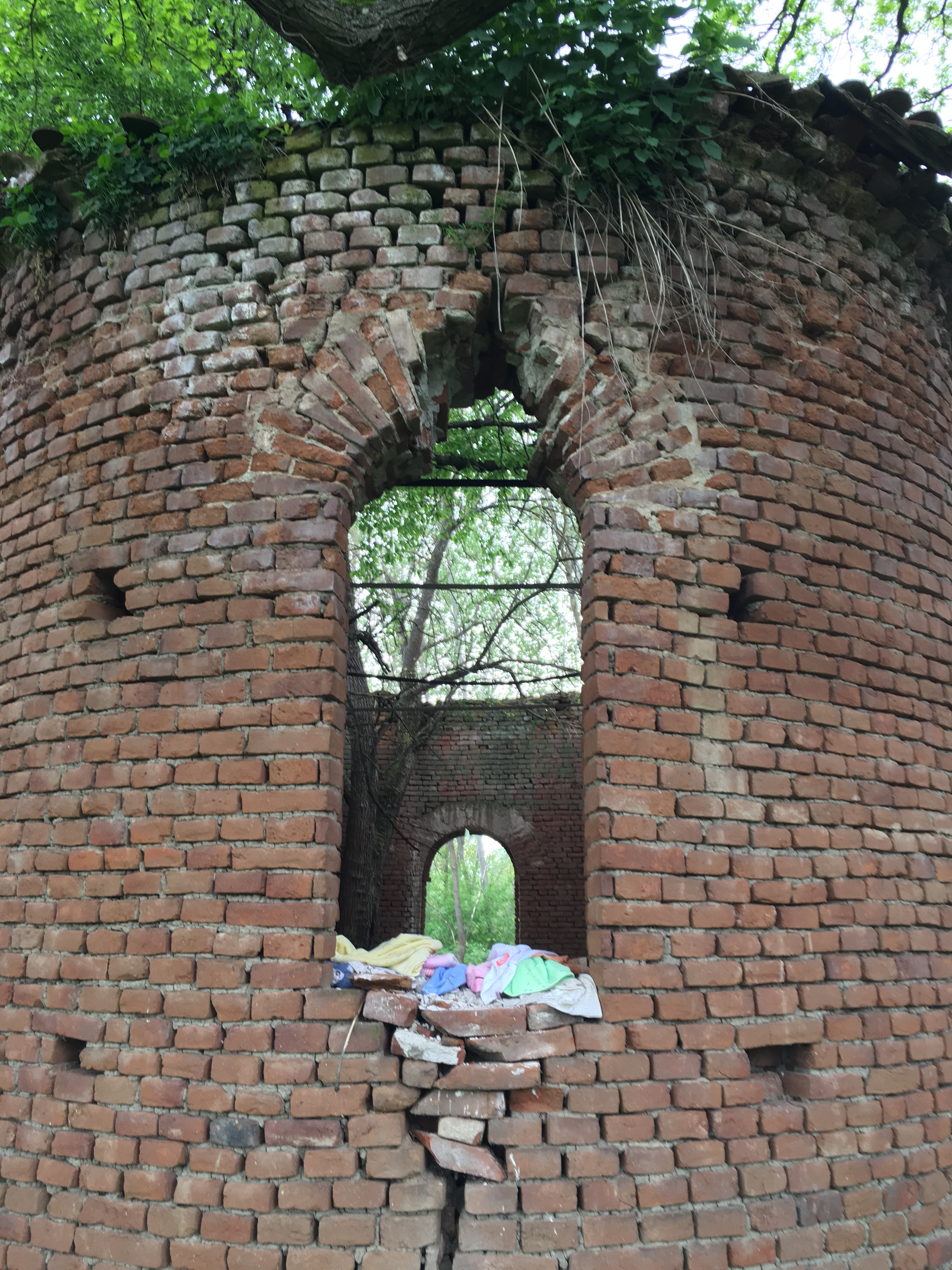
Churchyard.

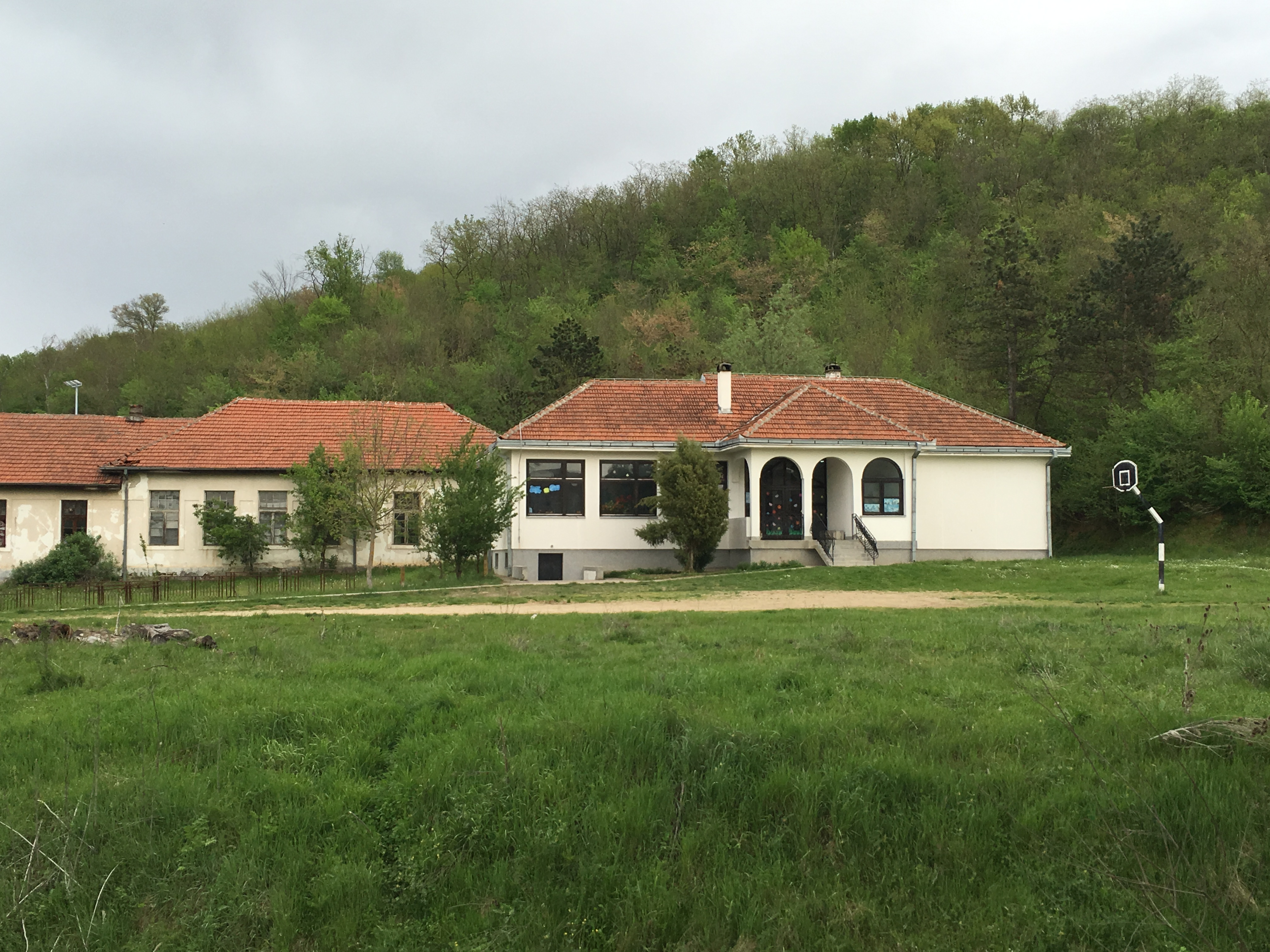
Primary school.

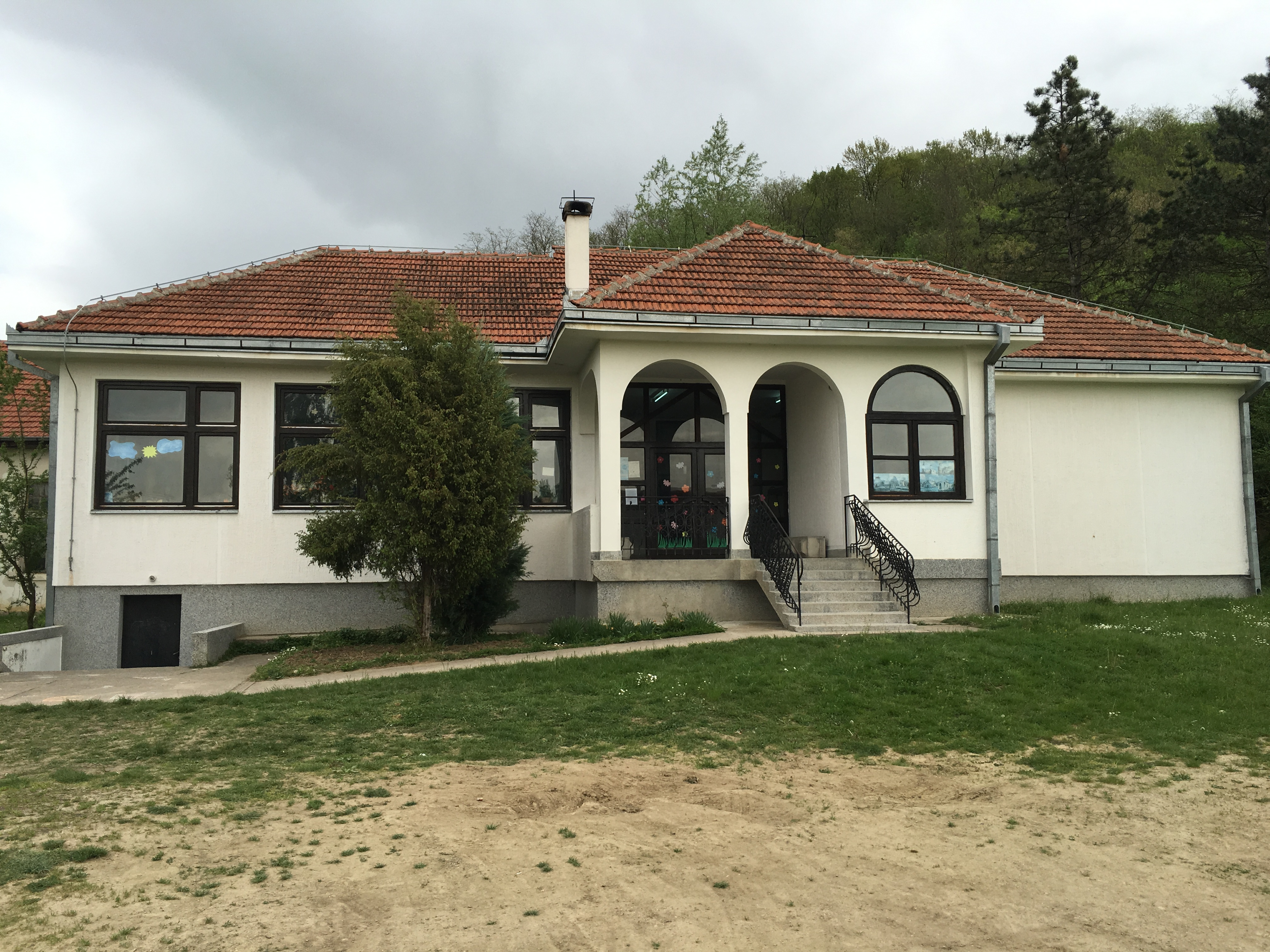
Primary school.

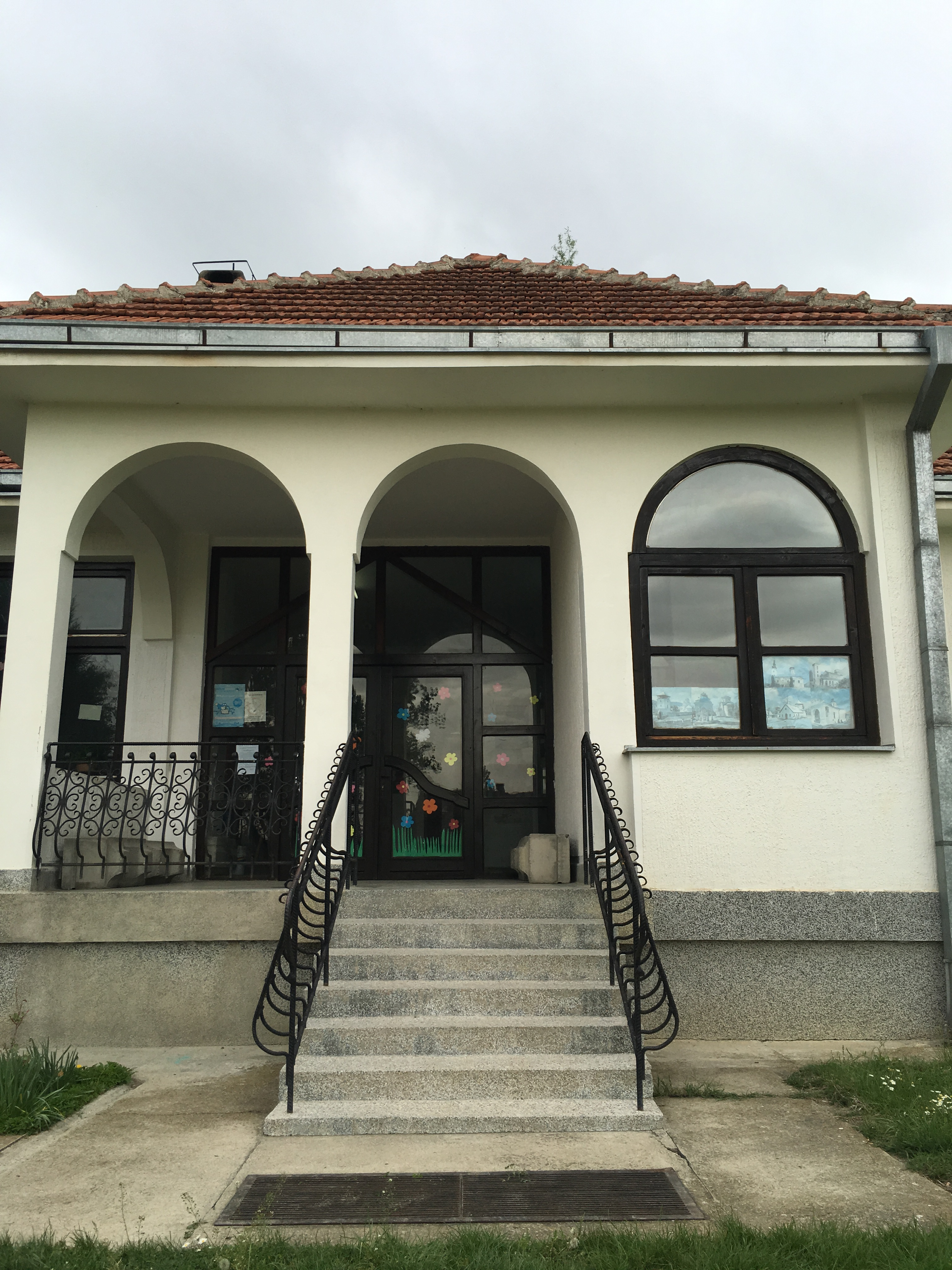
Primary school.

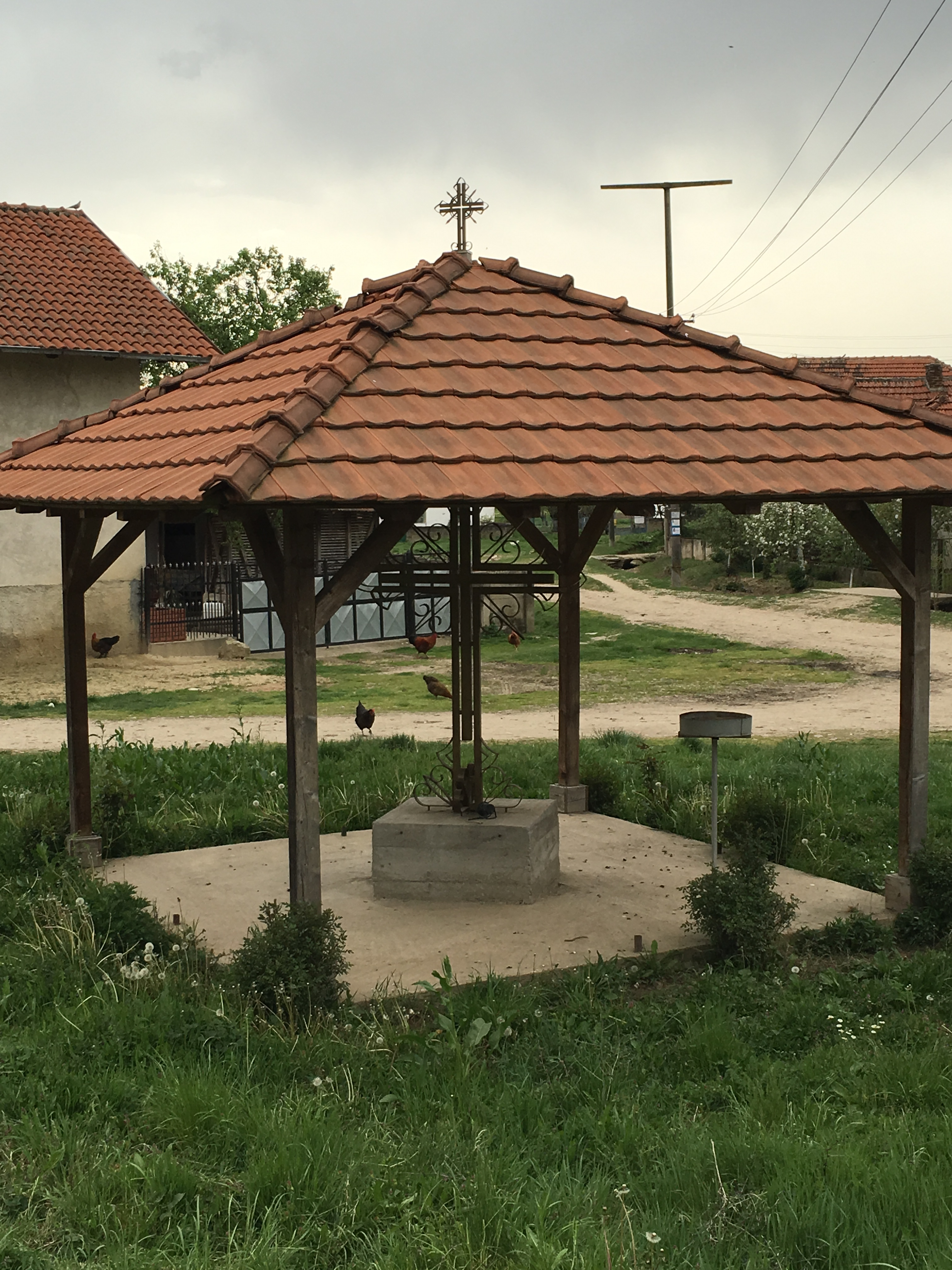
Orthodox cross.

== Sources ==
- Milićević, Milan Djuro (1884). Краљевина Србија: Ђ нови крајеви : Географија - Орографија - Хидрографија - Топографија - Аркеологија - Историја - Етнографија - Статистика - Просвета - Култура - Управа. Državna štamparija. p. 347.
