= Miloševići =

Miloševići may refer to:

- Miloševići, Višegrad, is a village in the municipality of Višegrad, Bosnia and Herzegovina
- Miloševići, Plužine, is a village in the municipality of Plužine, Montenegro
- Miloševići, Šavnik, is a village in the municipality of Šavnik, Montenegro

== See also ==
- Milošević
- Miloševo (disambiguation)
