= Mileševo =

Mileševo may refer to:

- Mileševo (Bečej), a village in municipality of Bečej, Serbia
- Mileševo (Prijepolje), a village in municipality of Prijepolje, Serbia
- Mileševo Monastery, a monastery near Prijepolje (Serbia)

== See also ==
- Miloševo (disambiguation)
- Maleševo (disambiguation)
- Mališevo, a settlement
