= Selce, Kruševo =

Selce Selce
- Village
- Location within North Macedonia
- Coordinates: 41°22′N 21°18′E
- Country: North Macedonia
- Region: Pelagonia
- Municipality: Kruševo

Population (2021)
  - Total: 6
- Time zone: UTC+1 (CET)
  - Summer (DST): UTC+2 (CEST)
- Car plates: KS
- Website: .

Selce (Macedonian: Selce) is a village in the municipality of Kruševo, North Macedonia.

== Demographics ==
According to the 2021 census, the village had a total of 6 inhabitants. Ethnic groups in the village include:

- Macedonians 6

Year	Macedonian	Albanian	Turks	Romani	Aromanians	Serbs	Bosniaks	Others	Total
2002	22	...	...	...	...	...	...	...	22
2021	6	...	...	...	...	...	...	...	6
