= Belušino =

Belušino Белушино Bellushinë
- Village
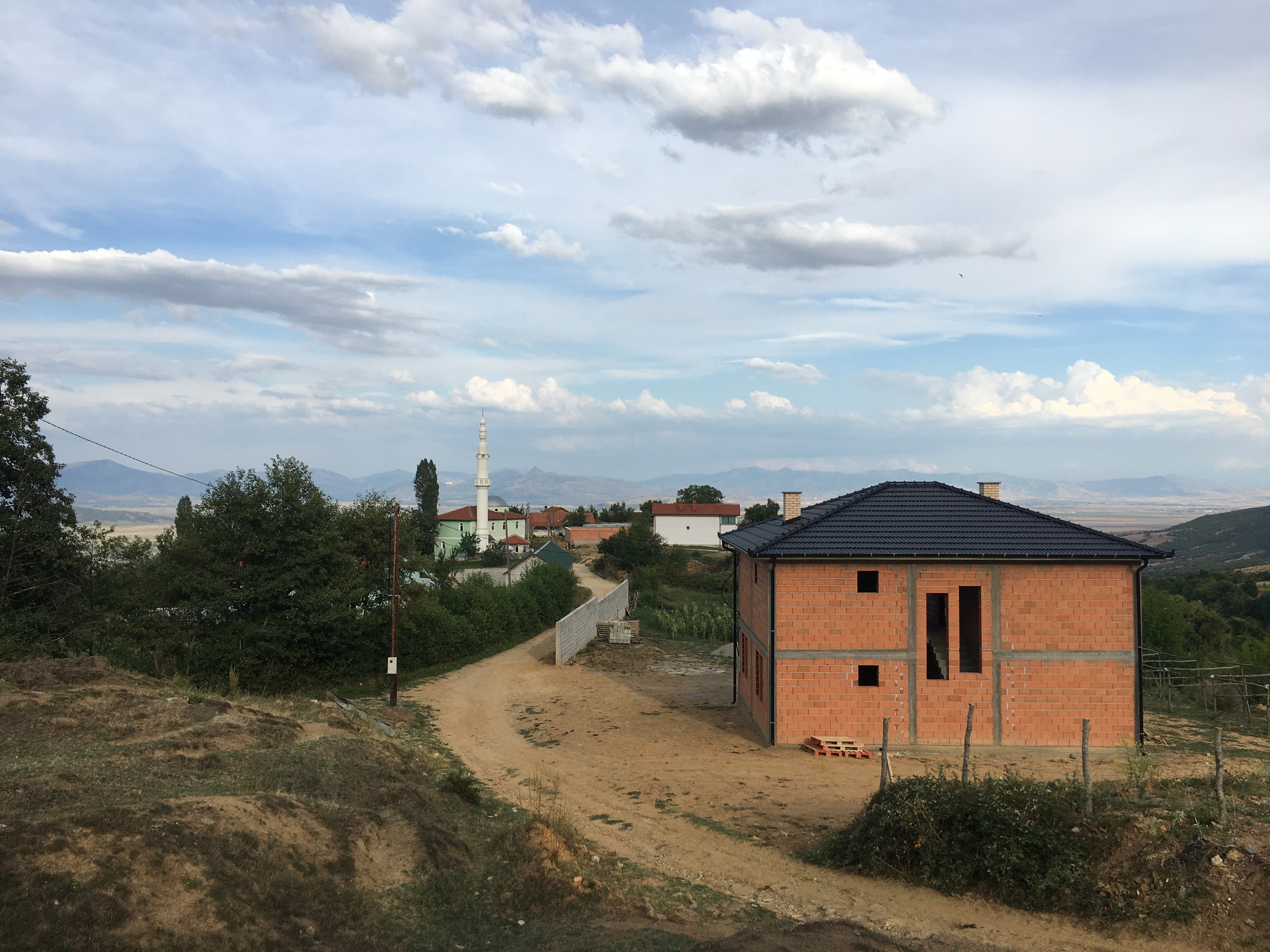
- View of the village

- Location within North Macedonia
- Coordinates: 41°26′N 21°15′E
- Country: North Macedonia
- Region: Pelagonia
- Municipality: Kruševo

Population (2021)
  - Total: 92
- Time zone: UTC+1 (CET)
  - Summer (DST): UTC+2 (CEST)
- Car plates: KS
- Website: .

Belušino (Macedonian: Белушино, Albanian: Bellushinë) is a village in the municipality of Kruševo, North Macedonia.

== Demographics ==
According to the 2002 census, the village had a total of 64 inhabitants. Ethnic groups in the village include:

- Albanians 91
- Others 1

| Year | Macedonian | Albanian | Turks | Romani | Vlachs | Serbs | Bosniaks | Others | Total |
|---|---|---|---|---|---|---|---|---|---|
| 2002 | ... | 62 | 2 | ... | ... | ... | ... | ... | 64 |
| 2021 | ... | 91 | ... | ... | ... | ... | ... | 1 | 92 |
