= Aldanci =

Aldanci Алданци Alldançe
- Village
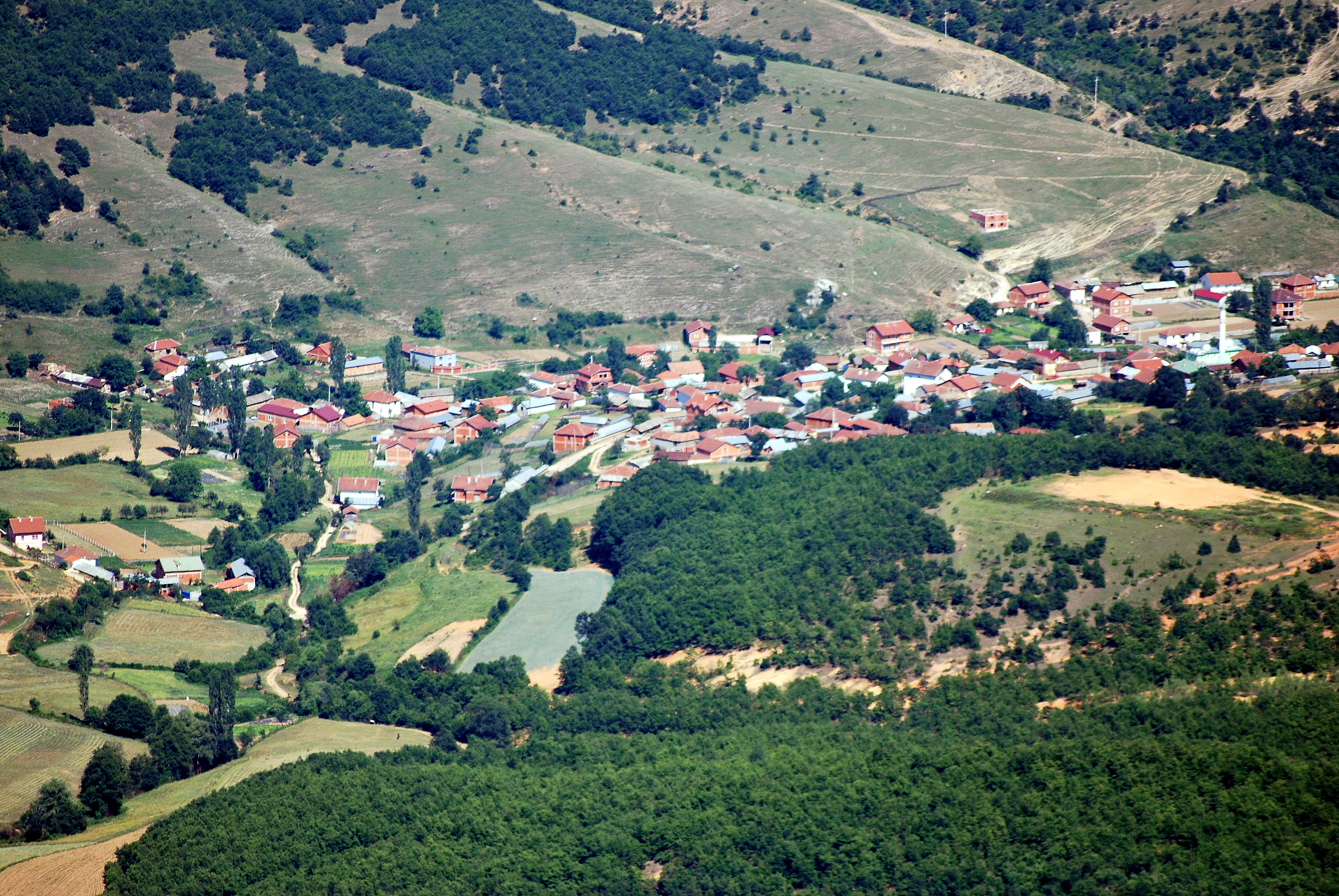
- Aldanci

- Location within North Macedonia
- Coordinates: 41°22′N 21°18′E
- Country: North Macedonia
- Region: Pelagonia
- Municipality: Kruševo

Population (2021)
  - Total: 442
- Time zone: UTC+1 (CET)
  - Summer (DST): UTC+2 (CEST)
- Car plates: KS
- Website: .

Aldanci (Macedonian: Алданци, Albanian: Alldançe) is a village in the municipality of Kruševo, North Macedonia.

== Demographics ==
According to the 2021 census, the village had a total of 442 inhabitants. Ethnic groups in the village include:

- Albanians 429
- Macedonians 5
- Others 8

Year	Macedonian	Albanian	Turks	Romani	Vlachs	Serbs	Bosniaks	Others	Total
2002	14	397	5	...	...	...	...	1	417
2021	5	429	...	...	...	...	...	8	442
