= Miloševo, Kruševo =

Miloševo Miloševo
- Village
- Location within North Macedonia
- Coordinates: 41°22′N 21°18′E
- Country: North Macedonia
- Region: Pelagonia
- Municipality: Kruševo

Population (2021)
  - Total: 42
- Time zone: UTC+1 (CET)
  - Summer (DST): UTC+2 (CEST)
- Car plates: BT
- Website: .

Miloševo (Macedonian: Miloševo) is a village in the municipality of Kruševo, North Macedonia.

== Demographics ==
According to the 2021 census, the village had a total of 42 inhabitants. Ethnic groups in the village include:

- Macedonians 42

Year	Macedonian	Albanian	Turks	Romani	Aromanians	Serbs	Bosniaks	Others	Total
2002	38	...	...	...	...	12	...	...	50
2021	42	...	...	...	...	...	...	...	42
