= Pusta (South Morava) =

Pusta River
- Native name: Пуста река (Serbian)

Location
- Country: Serbia

Physical characteristics
- Source
  - location: Radan mountain, near Prolom Banja, Serbia
- Mouth
  - location: South Morava, at Pukovac, Serbia
  - coordinates: 43°12′13″N 21°50′39″E
- Length: 71 km (44 mi)
- Basin size: 590 km^{2} (230 sq mi)

Basin features
- Progression: South Morava→ Great Morava→ Danube→ Black Sea

The Pusta River (Serbian: Пуста река / Pusta reka, lit. 'Desolate River') is a river in southern Serbia, a 71-km long left tributary to the South Morava. It also gives the name to the Pusta Reka region in its valley.

== River ==
The river originates northeast of Prolom Banja, near the Sokolovica village, on the northern tip of the Radan mountain, as the Golema River ('Big River'). It flows eastward, between the mountains of Radan (to the south) and Pasjača (to the north), next to the villages of Dobra Voda, Magaš, Brestovac and Velika Crkvica, before it reaches the regional center of Bojnik, after which, for the rest of its 46 km course, it is known as the Pusta River. From Bojnik, the river bends north, next to the villages of Dragovac, Pridvorica, Đinđuša, Lapotince, Kacabać, Kosančić, Donje Brijanje, Međa and Draškovac, before it empties into the South Morava, near the village of Pukovac.

The Pusta River drains an area of 590 km^{2}, belongs to the Black Sea drainage basin, and is not navigable.

== Region ==
The region of Pusta Reka mostly correspondence with the river's watershed. It is located between the Pasjača mountain and lower Toplica region (on the north), the Southern Pomoravlje (Leskovac Valley, on the east), the Jablanica region (on the south) and the Radan mountain (on the west). The region is an agricultural area, almost without any industry, except for some smaller facilities in regional center, Bojnik. As if it confirms the name of the river (Pusta reka in Serbian means 'Desolate river'), the region is economically undeveloped and poor, sparsely populated and depopulating (18,801 inhabitants in 1971 or 71 per km^{2}; 13,118 in 2002 or 50 per km^{2}).

The Pusta Reka region originated as a medieval župa (county) of Serbia, called Reke and Dubravnica. Pusta Reka was a short-lived srez of the Principality of Serbia following the Serbian–Ottoman Wars (1876–1878) and liberation. M. Milićević (1884) described Pusta Reka as a river and region (predeo), and listed Bogujevac, Dragi Del, Buklica, Magaš, Brestovac, Slavnik, Rečica, Crkvica, Bojnik, Dragovac, Đinđuša, Lopatnica, Stubla, Kacabać, Gornje Brijanje, Donje Brijanje as settlements by the river.

== Sources ==
- Đorđević, Vladan (1880). "Из нове Србије: IV. Пуста Река". Otadžbina. pp. 354-.
- Mala Prosvetina Enciklopedija, Third edition (1985); Prosveta; ISBN 86-07-00001-2
- Jovan Đ. Marković (1990): Enciklopedijski geografski leksikon Jugoslavije; Svjetlost-Sarajevo; ISBN 86-01-02651-6
