= Pusta Reka, Kruševo =

Pusta Reka Пуста Река
- Village
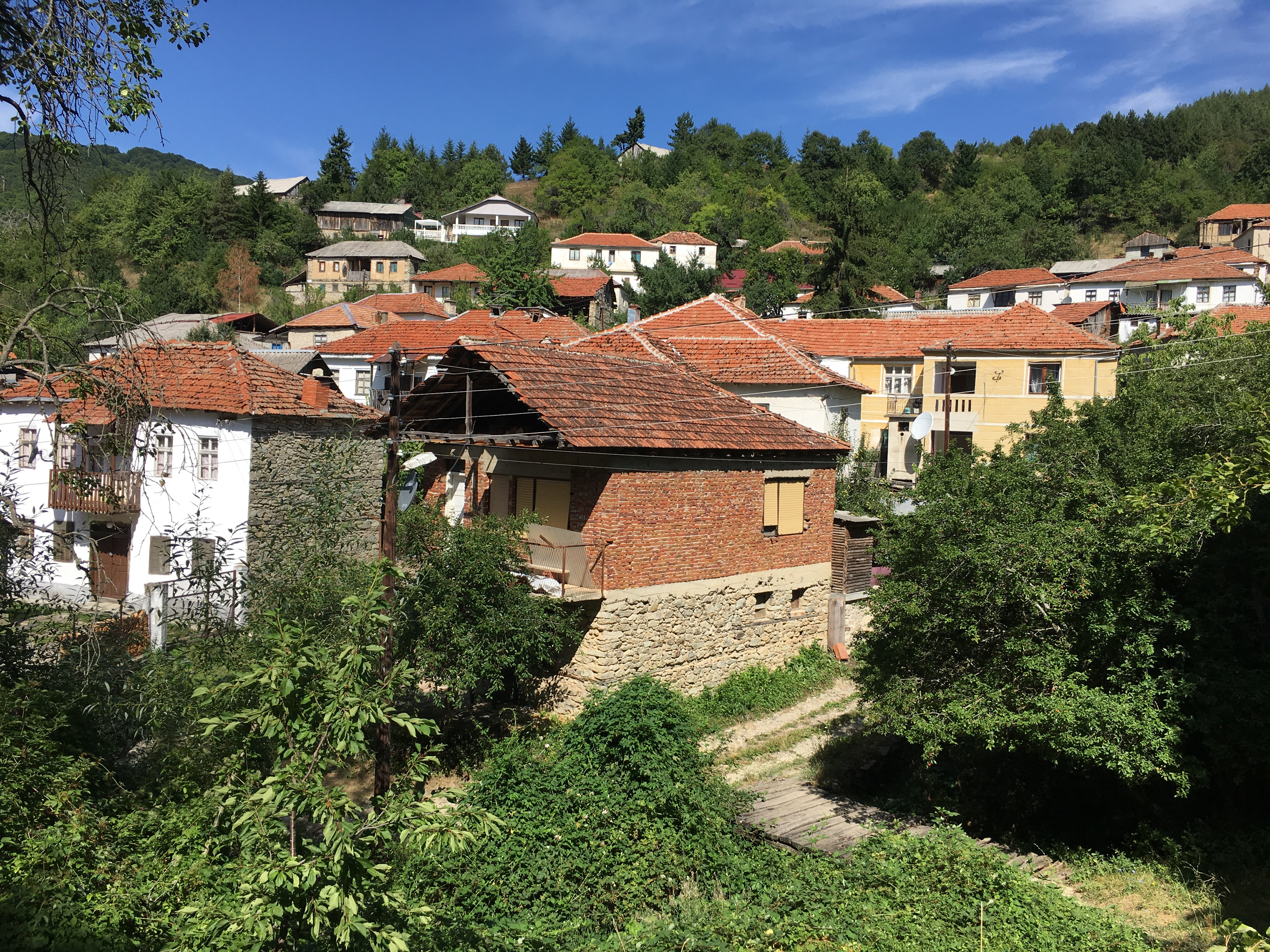
- Houses in the village Pusta Reka

- Location within North Macedonia
- Coordinates: 41°24′46″N 21°9′20″E
- Country: North Macedonia
- Region: Pelagonia
- Municipality: Kruševo

Population (2021)
  - Total: 53
- Time zone: UTC+1 (CET)
  - Summer (DST): UTC+2 (CEST)
- Area code: +38948
- Car plates: KS
- Website: .

Pusta Reka (Macedonian: Пуста Река) is a village in the municipality of Kruševo, North Macedonia.

== Demographics ==
According to the 2021 census, the village had a total of 53 inhabitants. Ethnic groups in the village include:

- Macedonians 46
- Persons for whom data are taken from administrative sources 7

Year	Macedonian	Albanian	Turks	Romani	Vlachs	Serbs	Bosniaks	Persons for whom data are taken from admin. sources	Total
2002	134	...	...	...	...	...	...	...	134
2021	46	...	...	...	...	...	...	7	53
