= Crkvica (Bojnik) =

Crkvica Црквица
- Village
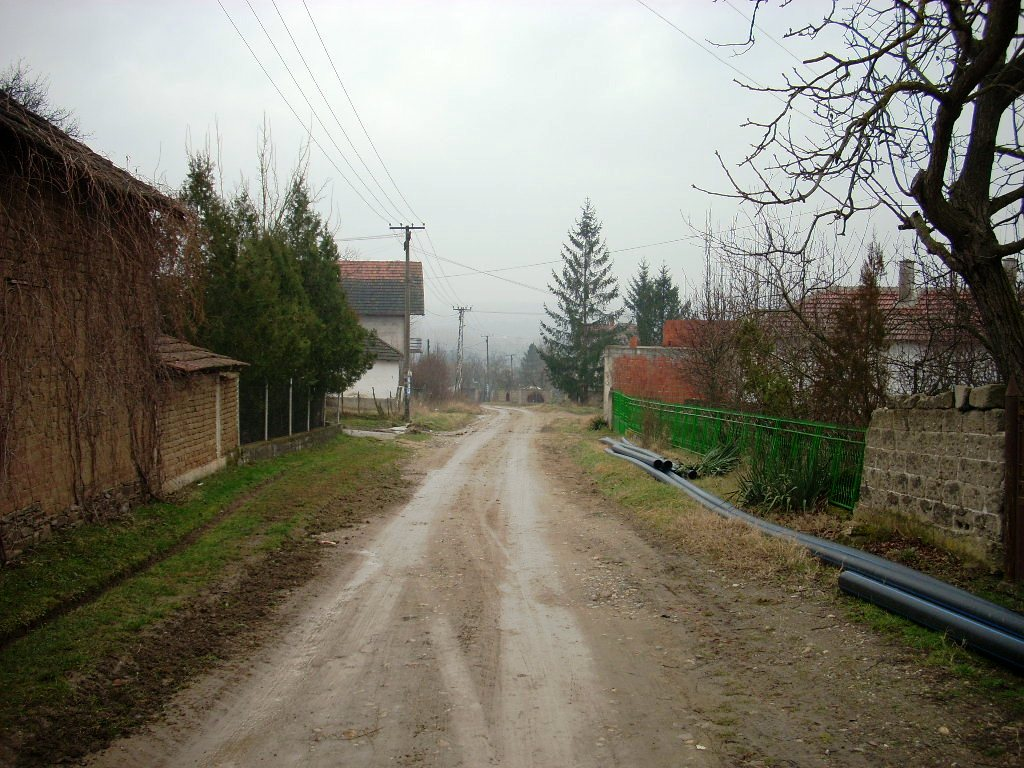
- Street in Crkvica

- Location in Serbia
- Coordinates: 43°01′37″N 21°41′38″E
- Country: Serbia
- Region: Southern and Eastern Serbia
- District: Jablanica
- Municipality: Bojnik
- Elevation: 850 ft (260 m)

Population (2011)
  - Total: 533
- Time zone: UTC+1 (CET)
  - Summer (DST): UTC+2 (CEST)

Crkvica (Serbian Cyrillic: Црквица) is a village in the municipality of Bojnik, Serbia. According to the 2011 census, the village has a population of 533 inhabitants.

The village is mentioned in the 1884 work of M. Milićević. The settlement is located in the region of Pusta Reka, and the Pusta river crosses by it.

== Population ==
Population of Crkvice
1948	1953	1961	1971	1981	1991	2002	2011
921	903	832	783	761	680	643	533

== Gallery ==
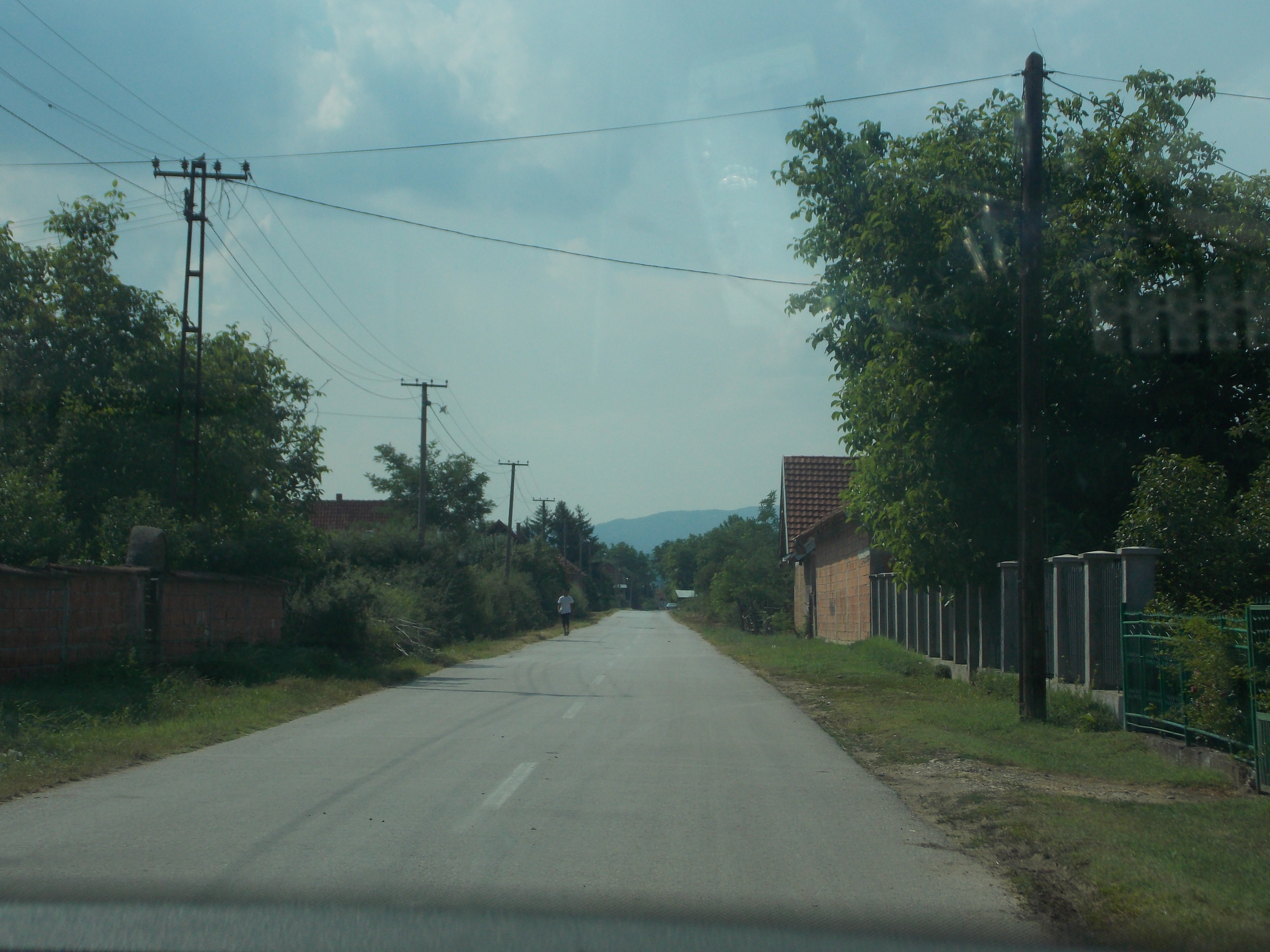
A street in the village.

== Sources ==
- Milićević, Milan Djuro (1884). Краљевина Србија: Ђ нови крајеви : Географија - Орографија - Хидрографија - Топографија - Аркеологија - Историја - Етнографија - Статистика - Просвета - Култура - Управа. Državna štamparija. p. 347.
