= Bučin =

Bučin Бучин
- Village
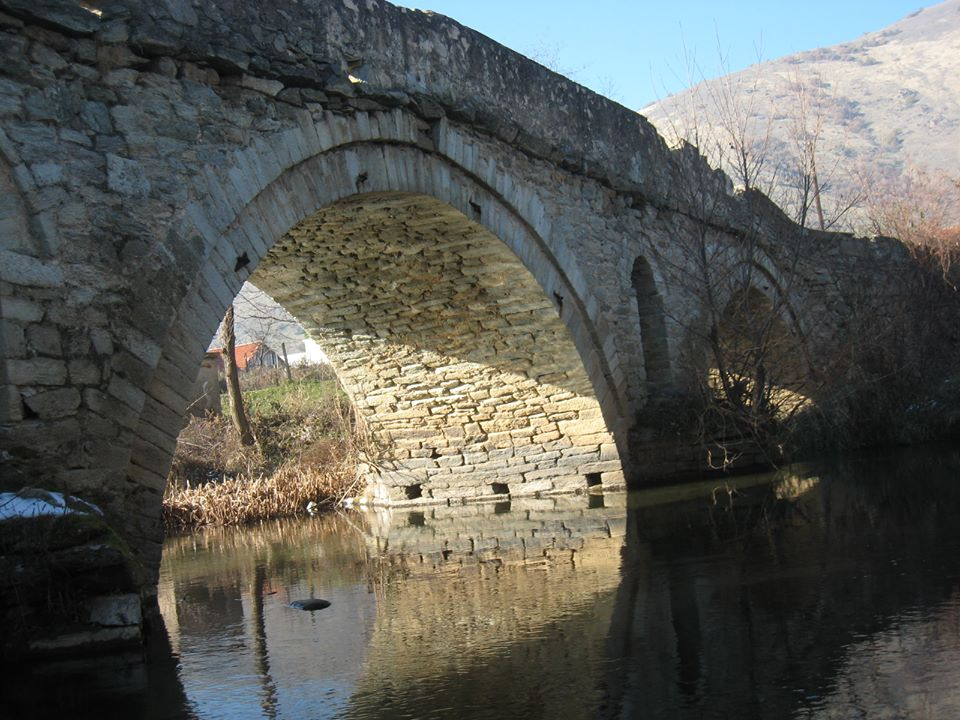
- Bridge at Bučin village

- Location within North Macedonia
- Country: North Macedonia
- Region: Pelagonia
- Municipality: Kruševo

Population (2021)
  - Total: 522
- Time zone: UTC+1 (CET)
  - Summer (DST): UTC+2 (CEST)
- Car plates: KS
- Website: .

Bučin (Macedonian Cyrillic: Бучин) is a village which lies in the Kruševo Municipality of North Macedonia on both banks of the Crna River.

The village maintains a distinct bridge built in the Ottoman Empire, and is home to a unique old building constructed above the surface of the Crna River. The village now known as Bucin was part of the land of Ancient Macedonia called ''Alcomenae'' or Alkomenai (Αλκομεναί in Greek language) which was a town of the Deuriopes on the Erigon, in the Pelagonia Region in Ancient Macedonia. Its site is tentatively located near modern Bučin (Buchin) in North Macedonia. The main produce of the village is onions. Peppers, tomatoes, leeks, tobacco, garlic and beans are also grown.

== Demographics ==
According to the 2021 census, the village had a total of 502 inhabitants. Ethnic groups in the village include:

- Macedonians 502

Year	Macedonian	Albanian	Turks	Romani	Vlachs	Serbs	Bosniaks	Others	Total
2002	738	...	...	...	...	...	...	...	738
2021	502	...	...	...	1	...	...	19	522
