= Obrad =

Obrad (Serbian Cyrillic: Обрад) is a Serbian masculine given name. It may refer to:

- Obrad Belošević (1928–1986), Serbian basketball referee
- Obrad Gluščević (1913–1980), Yugoslav film director
- Obrad Piljak (1933–2013), Bosnian politician and economist
- Obrad Stanojević (1934–2011), Serbian legal historian and professor
- Obrad Zelić (born 1946), Serbian dentist and professor
- Obrad (veliki tepčija), Serbian nobleman
- Obrad Dragoslalić, Serbian nobleman

== See also ==
- Obradović
- Obradovce
