= Obradović =

Obradović (Serbian Cyrillic: Обрадовић, pronounced [obrǎːdoʋitɕ]) is a Serbian patronymic surname derived from a masculine given name Obrad. It may refer to:

- Aleksandar Obradović (1927-2001), Serbian composer
- Bogdan Obradović, Serbian tennis coach
- Dositej Obradović, Serbian author
- Đorđe Obradović-Ćurčija (died 1804), Serbian rebel
- Goran Obradović (born 1976), Serbian footballer
- Goran Obradović (born 1986), Serbian footballer
- Hristina Obradović, (1931-2026), Serbian abbess
- Iva Obradović, Serbian rower
- Ivan Obradović, Serbian footballer
- Marija Obradović (handballer), Serbian handball player
- Milan Obradović, Serbian footballer
- Miloš Obradović, Serbian footballer
- Milovan Obradović, Serbian footballer
- Radojko Obradović, Serbian politician
- Saša Obradović, Serbian basketball coach and former player
- Srđan Obradović, Serbian footballer
- Svetozar Obradović, Serbian writer
- Vuk Obradović, Serbian general
- Žarko Obradović, Serbian politician
- Željko Obradović, Serbian basketball coach

== In popular culture ==
- Mess O'Bradovich, a character in a video game Cadillacs and Dinosaurs
