= Preslap =

Preslap Преслап (Serbian)
- Village
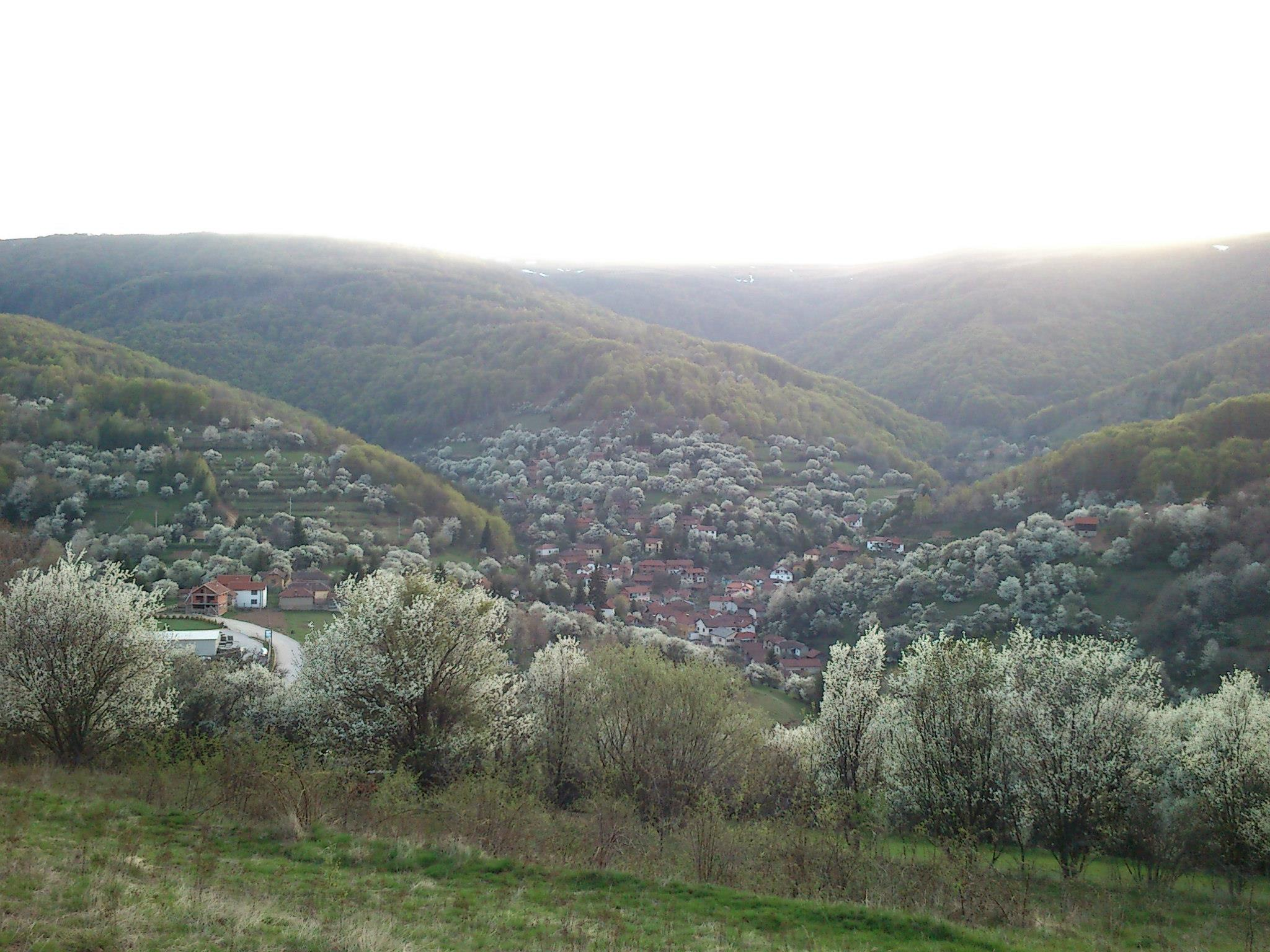

- Location within Serbia
- Coordinates: 42°49′21″N 22°24′29″E
- Country: Serbia
- District: Jablanica District
- Municipality: Crna Trava

Population (2002)
  - Total: 251
- Time zone: UTC+1 (CET)
  - Summer (DST): UTC+2 (CEST)

Preslap (Serbian Cyrillic: Преслап) is a village in the municipality of Crna Trava, Serbia. According to the 2002 census, the village has a population of 251 people.
