= Bajinci =

Bajinci Бајинци (Serbian)
- Village
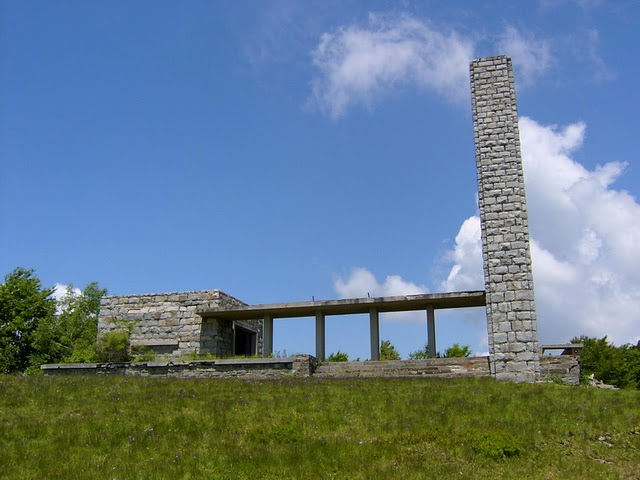
- World War II monument in Bajinci

- Location within Serbia
- Coordinates: 42°47′N 22°15′E
- Country: Serbia
- District: Jablanica District
- Municipality: Crna Trava

Population (2002)
  - Total: 23
- Time zone: UTC+1 (CET)
  - Summer (DST): UTC+2 (CEST)

Bajinci (Serbian: Бајинци) is a village in the municipality of Crna Trava, Serbia. According to the 2002 census, the village has a population of 23 people.
