= Dobro Polje, Crna Trava =

Dobro Polje Добро Поље (Serbian)
- Village
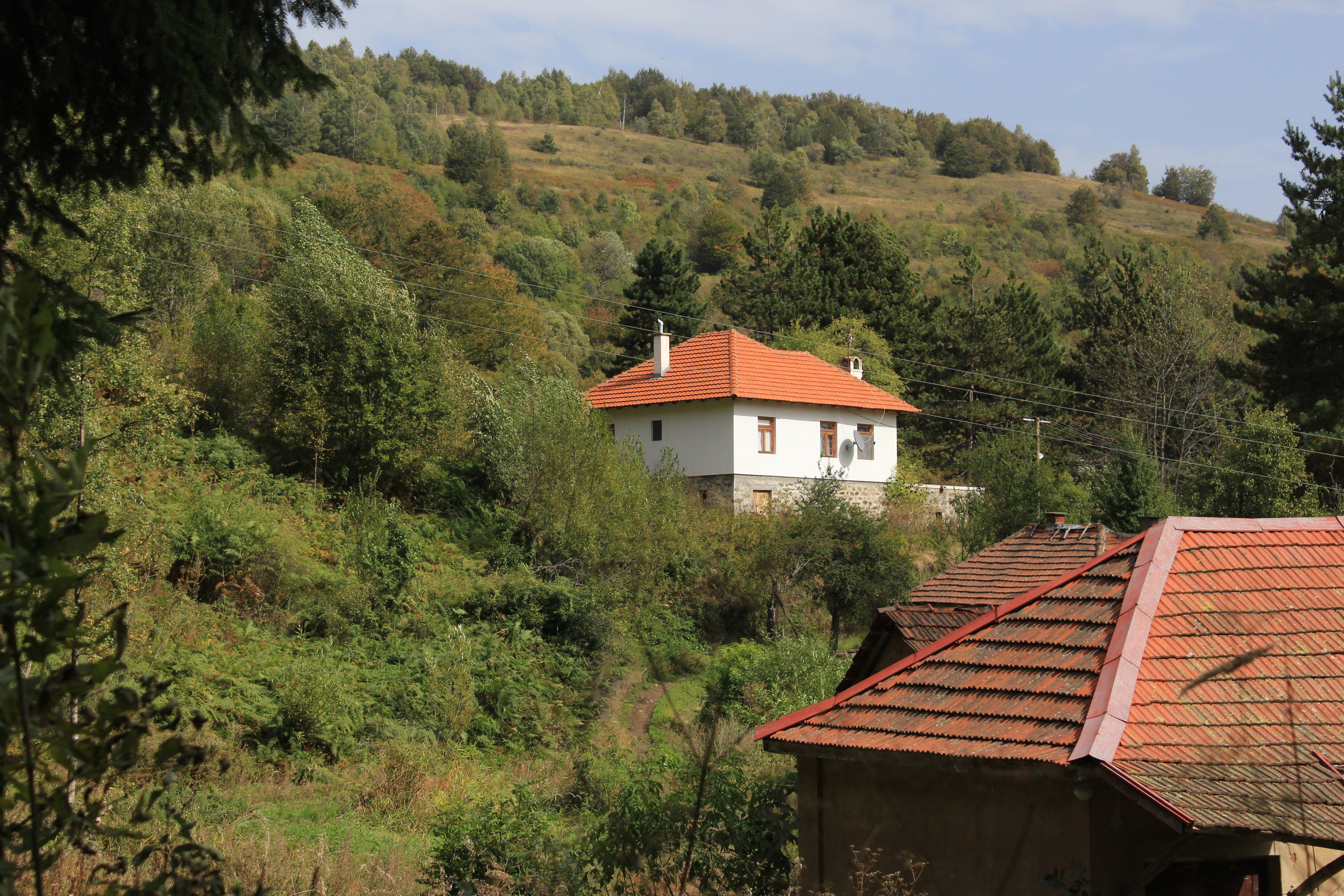
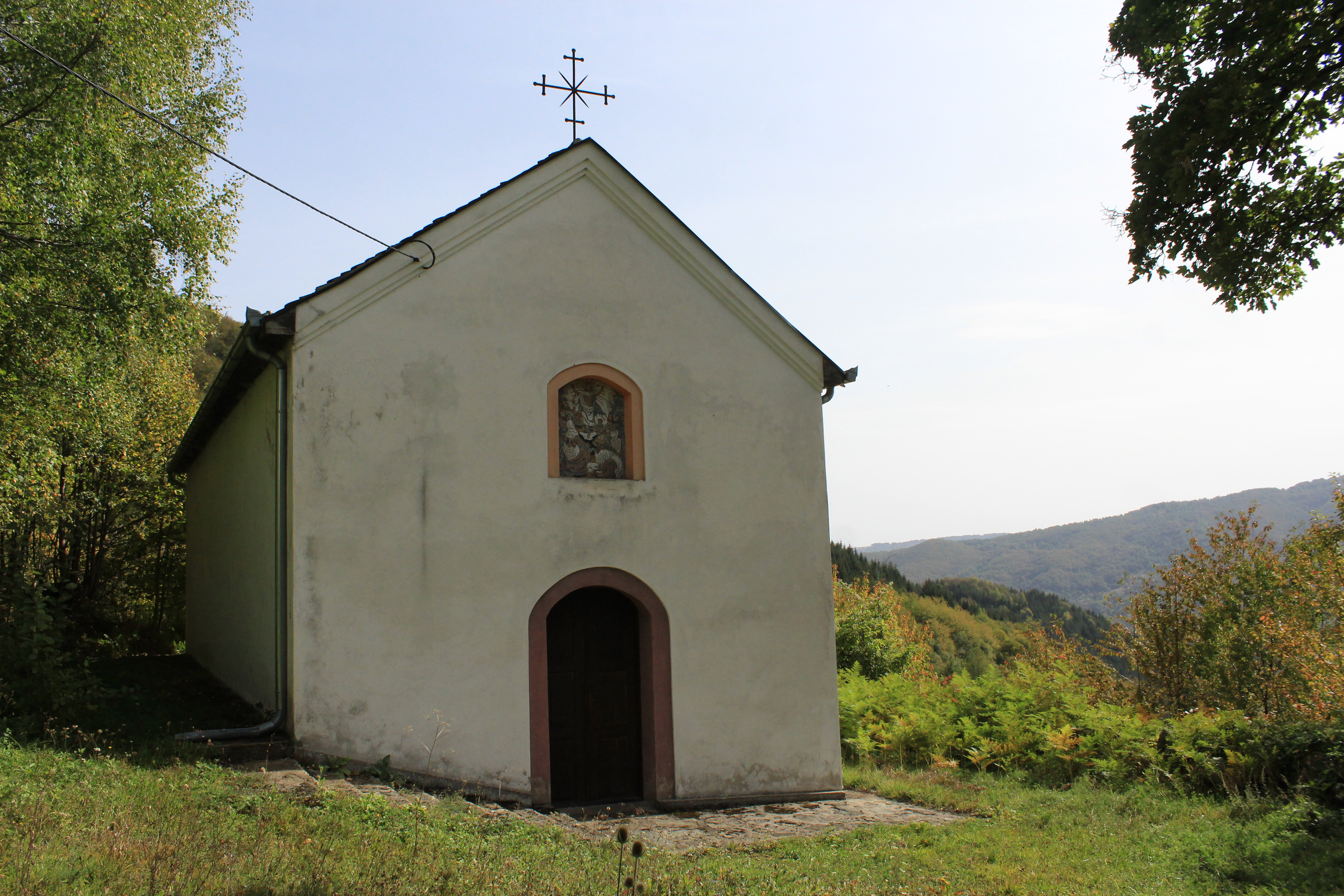
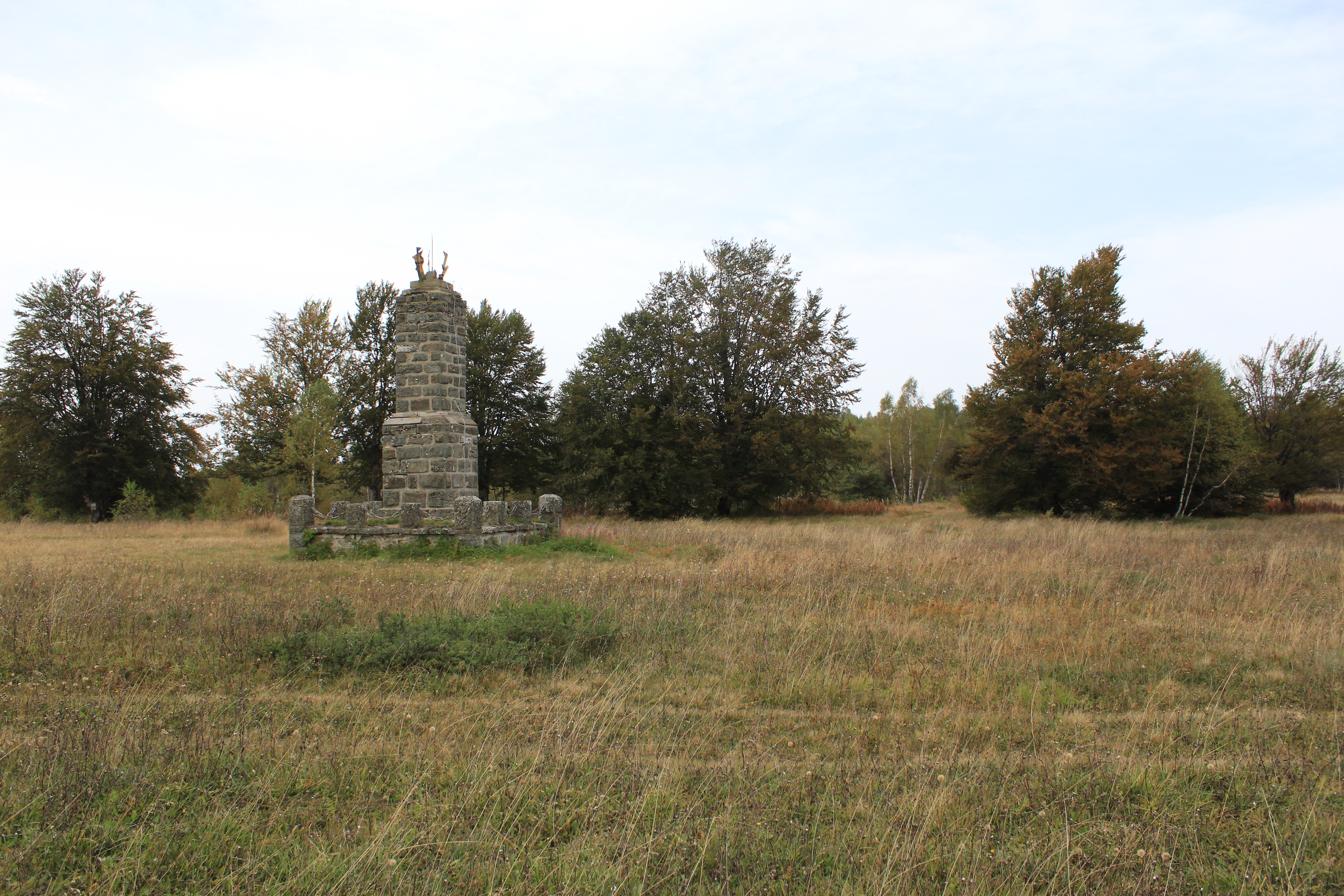
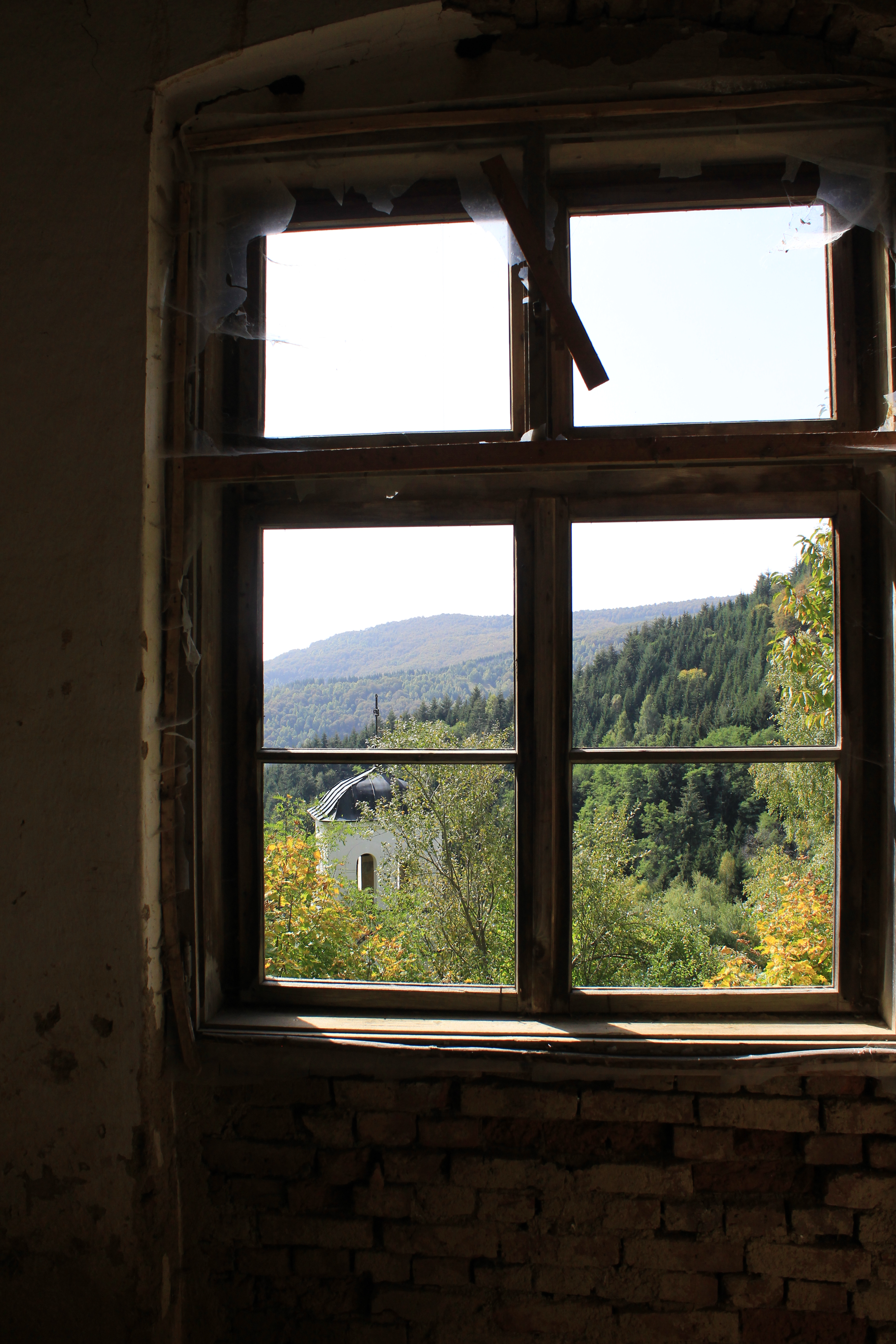
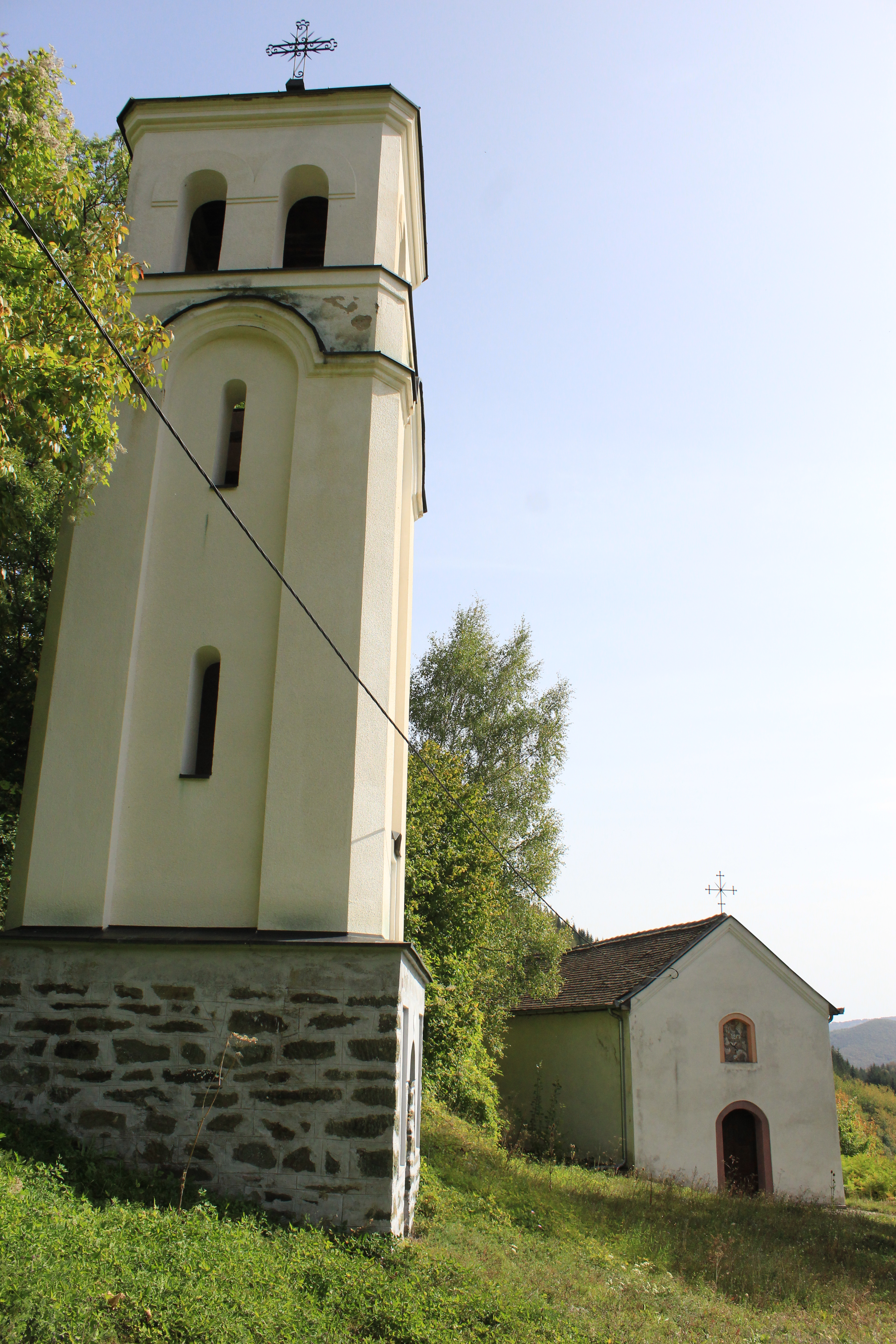
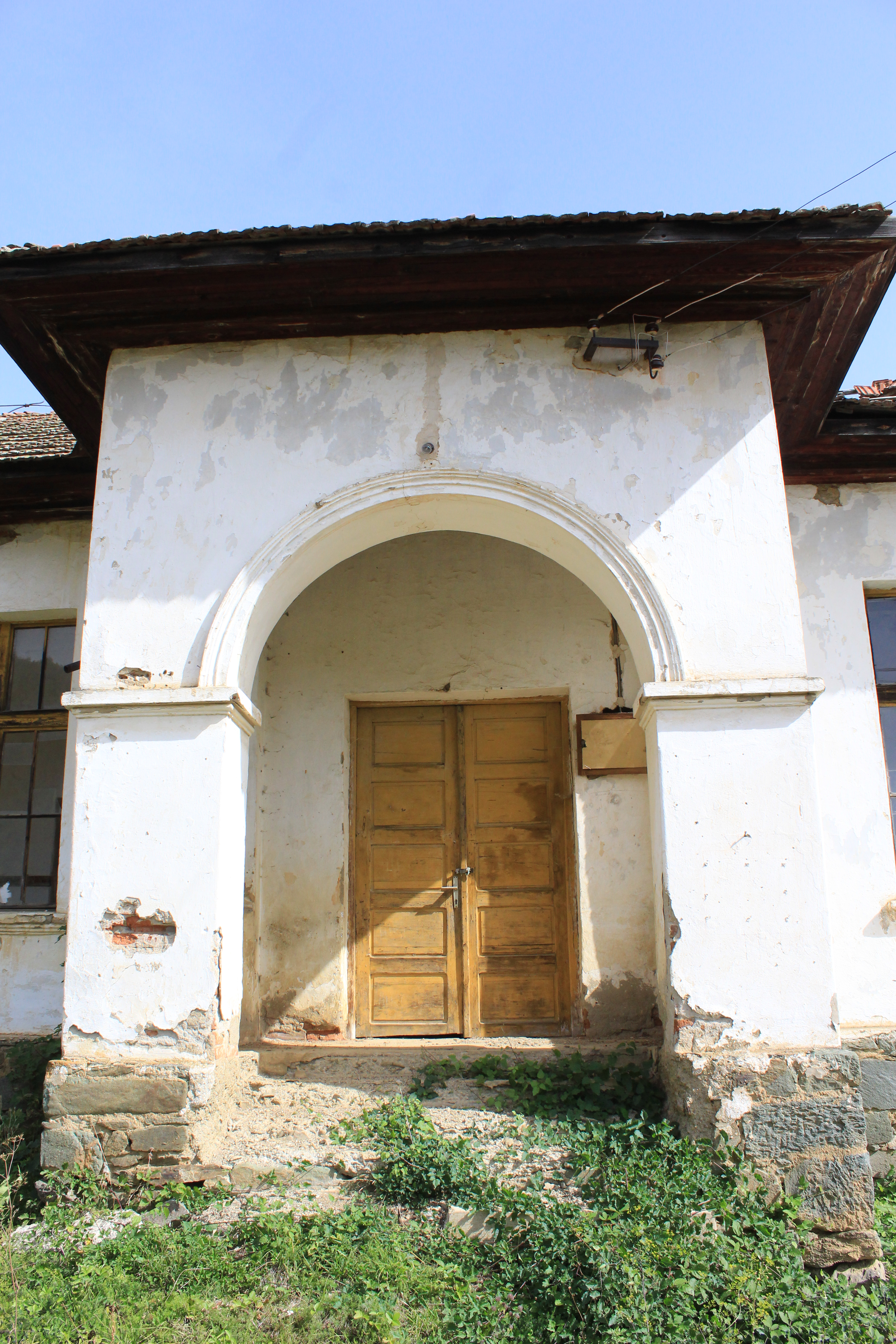
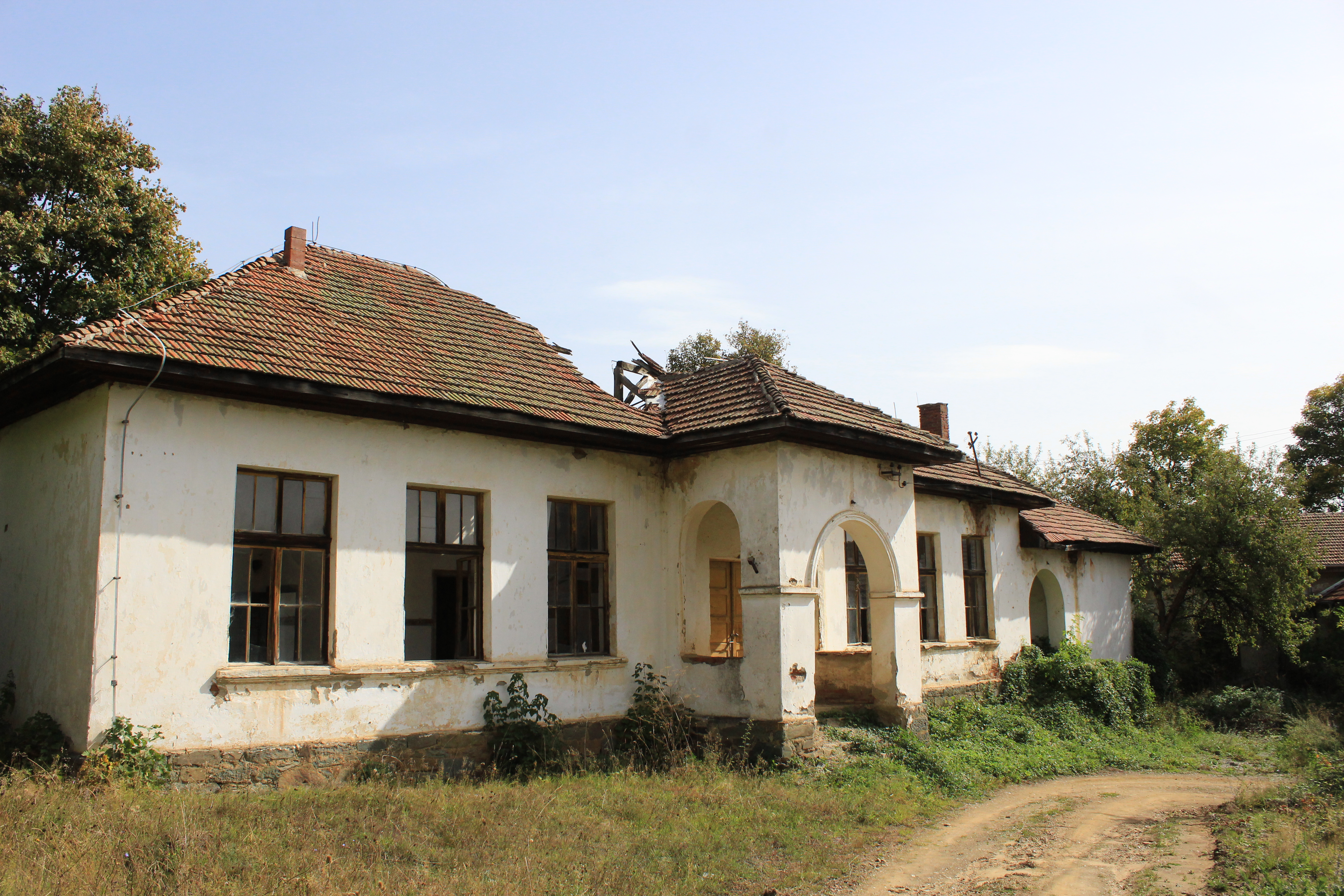
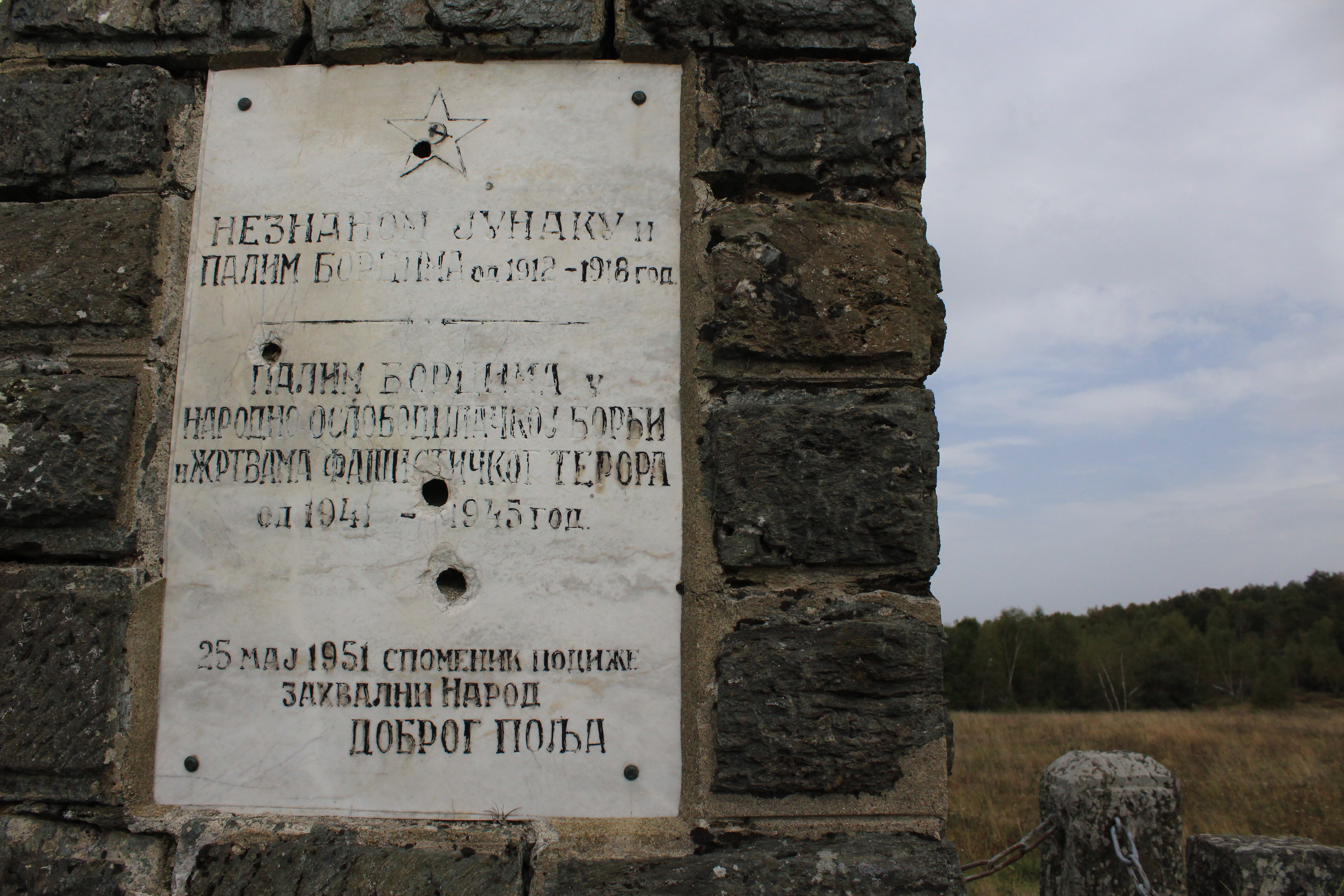

- Location within Serbia
- Coordinates: 42°53′N 22°17′E
- Country: Serbia
- District: Jablanica District
- Municipality: Crna Trava

Population (2002)
  - Total: 16
- Time zone: UTC+1 (CET)
  - Summer (DST): UTC+2 (CEST)

Dobro Polje (Serbian Cyrillic: Добро Поље) is a village in the municipality of Crna Trava, Serbia. According to the 2002 census, the village has a population of 16 people.

== Gallery ==
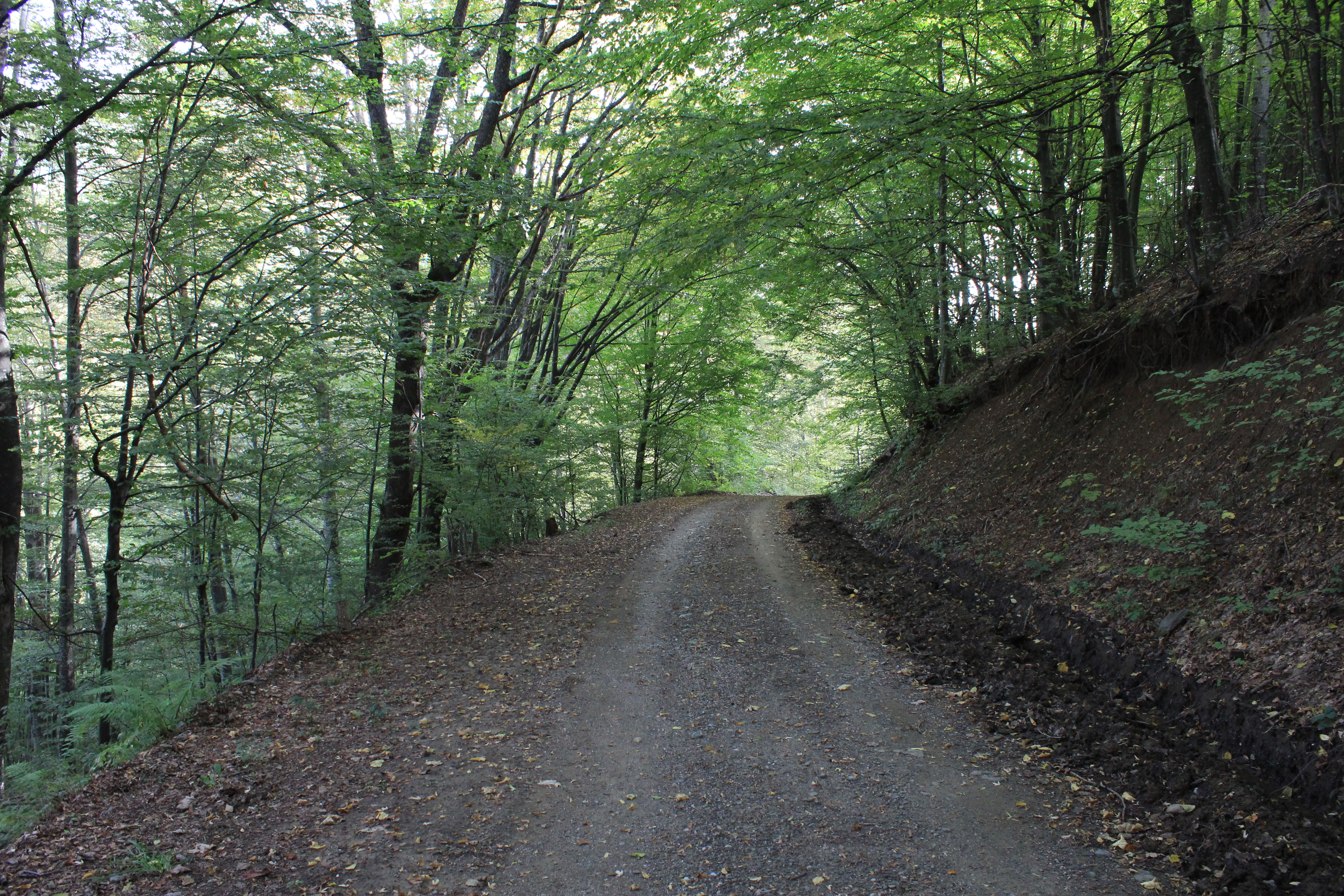

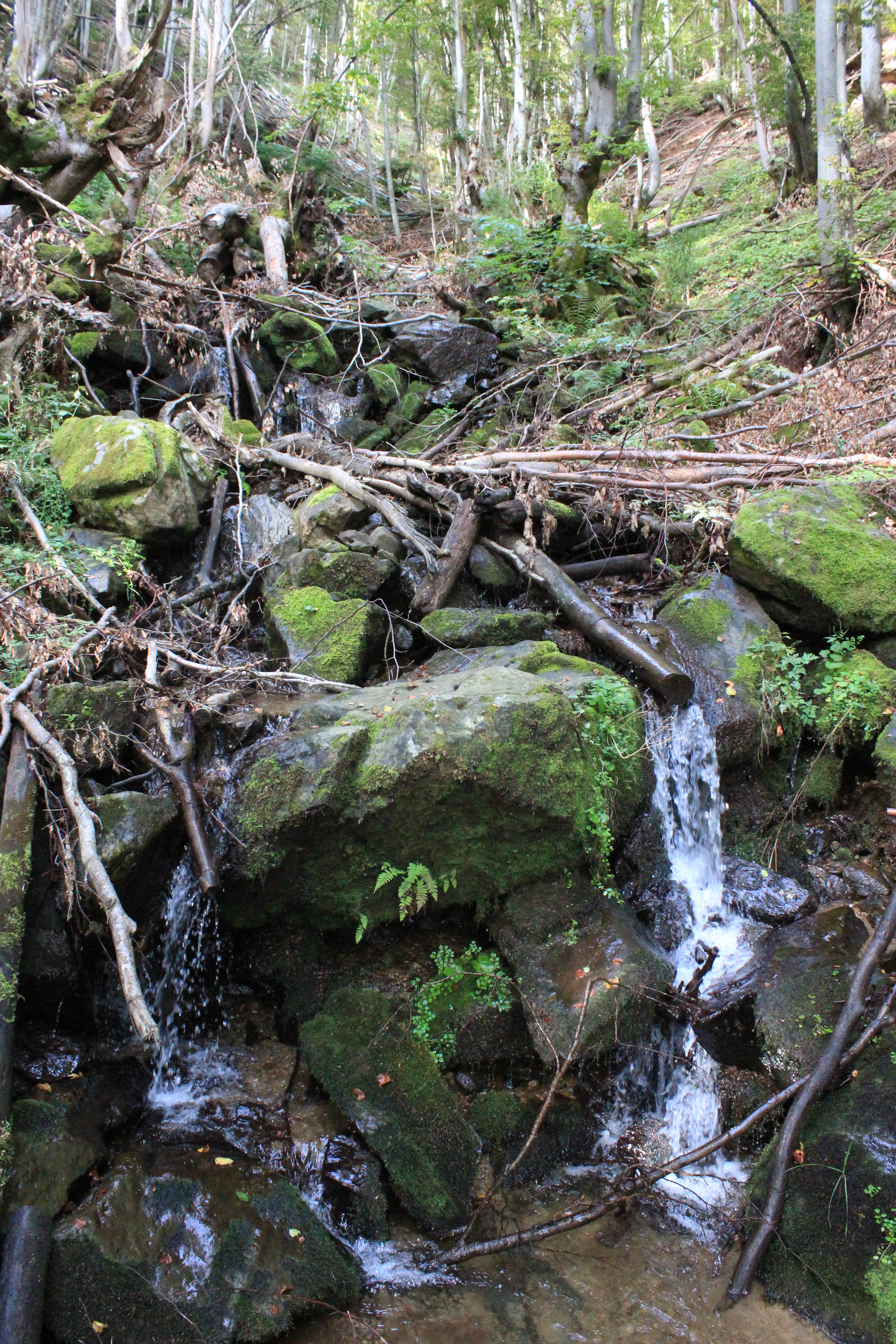

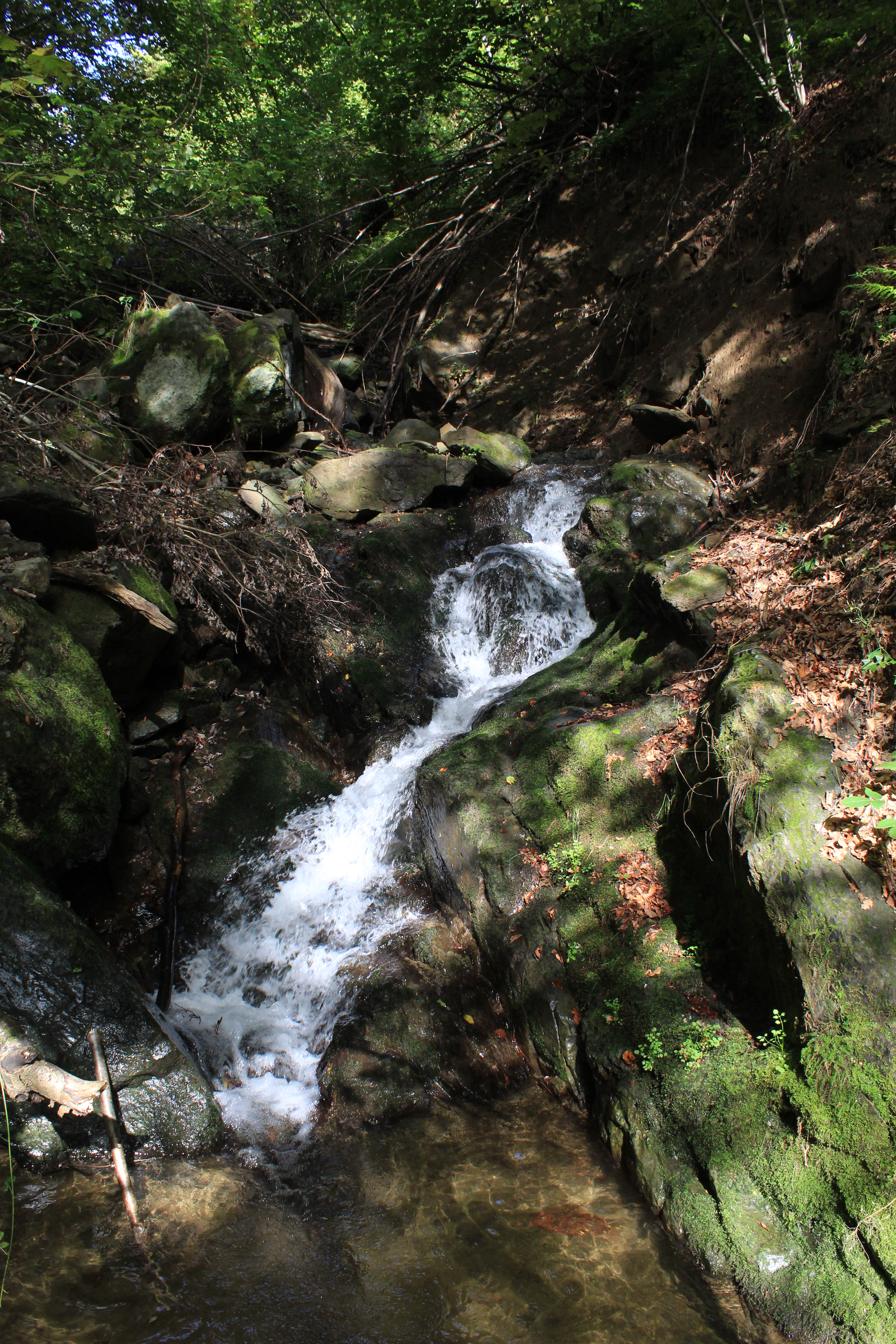

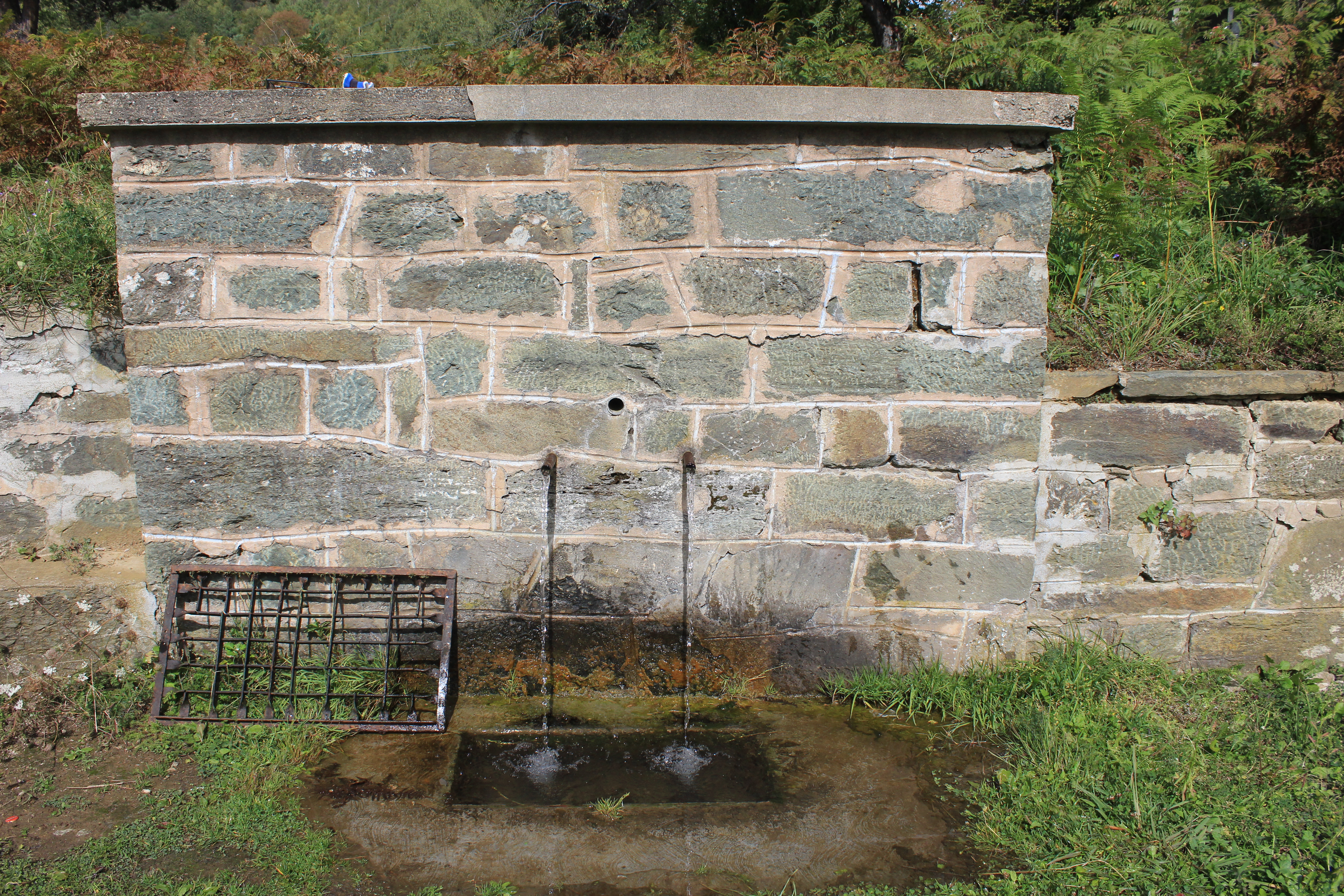

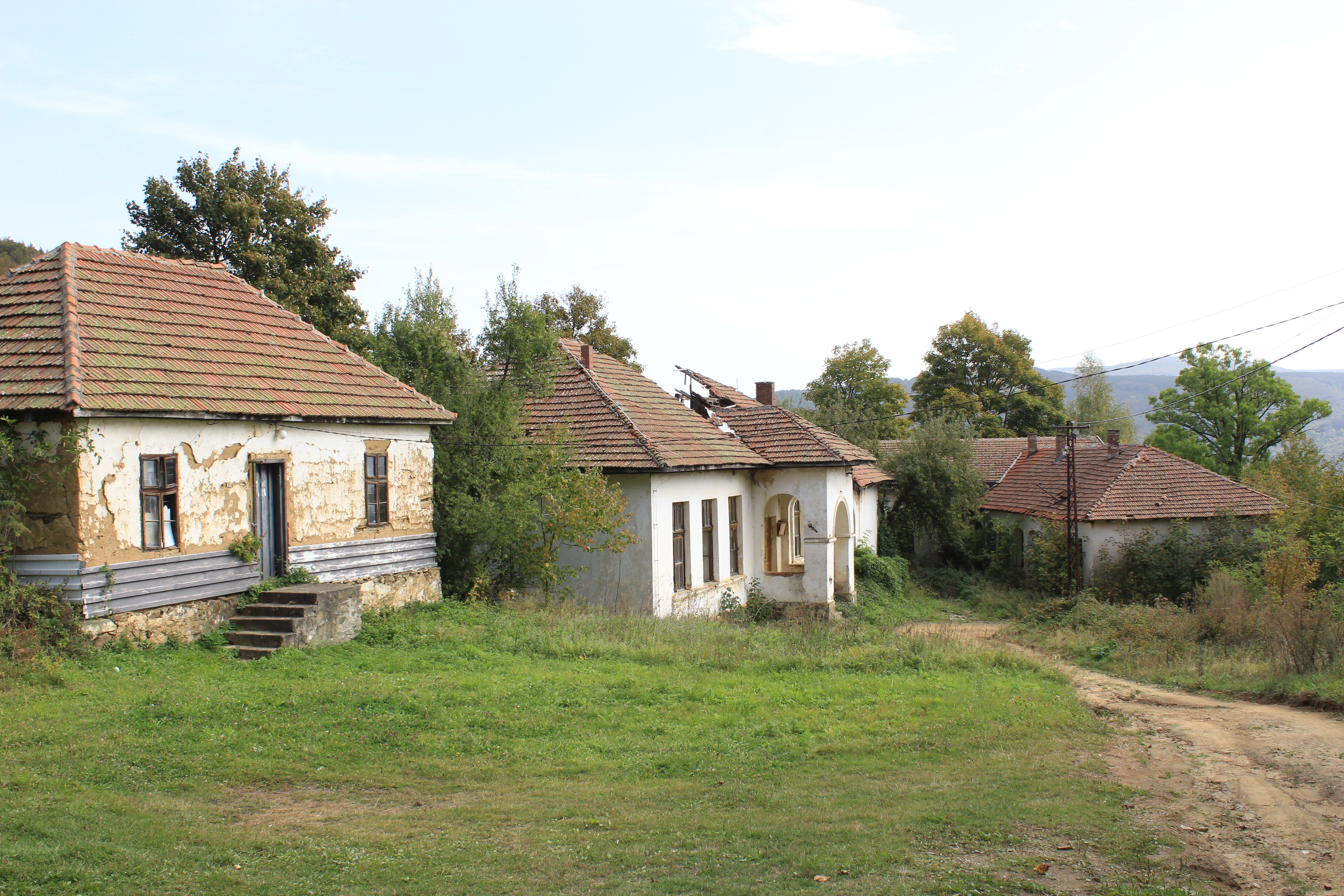
