= Vus, Crna Trava =

Vus Вус (Serbian)
- Village
- Location within Serbia
- Country: Serbia
- District: Jablanica District
- Municipality: Crna Trava

Population (2011)
  - Total: 8
- Time zone: UTC+1 (CET)
  - Summer (DST): UTC+2 (CEST)

Vus (Serbian Cyrillic: Вус) is a village in the municipality of Crna Trava, Serbia. According to the 2011 census, the village has a population of 8 people.
