= Jabukovik =

Jabukovik Јабуковик (Serbian)
- Village
- Location within Serbia
- Coordinates: 42°54′20″N 22°22′09″E
- Country: Serbia
- District: Jablanica District
- Municipality: Crna Trava

Population (2002)
  - Total: 97
- Time zone: UTC+1 (CET)
  - Summer (DST): UTC+2 (CEST)

Jabukovik (Serbian Cyrillic: Јабуковик) (pronounced [jâbukoʋiːk]) is a village in the municipality of Crna Trava, Serbia. According to the 2002 census, the village has a population of 97 people.
