= Bistrica (Crna Trava) =

Bistrica Бистрица (Serbian)
- Village
- Location within Serbia
- Coordinates: 42°53′47″N 22°13′56″E
- Country: Serbia
- District: Jablanica District
- Municipality: Crna Trava

Population (2002)
  - Total: 8
- Time zone: UTC+1 (CET)
  - Summer (DST): UTC+2 (CEST)

Bistrica (Serbian Cyrillic: Бистрица) is a village in the municipality of Crna Trava, Serbia. According to the 2002 census, the village has a population of 8 people.
