= Čuka =

Čuka Чука (Serbian)
- Village
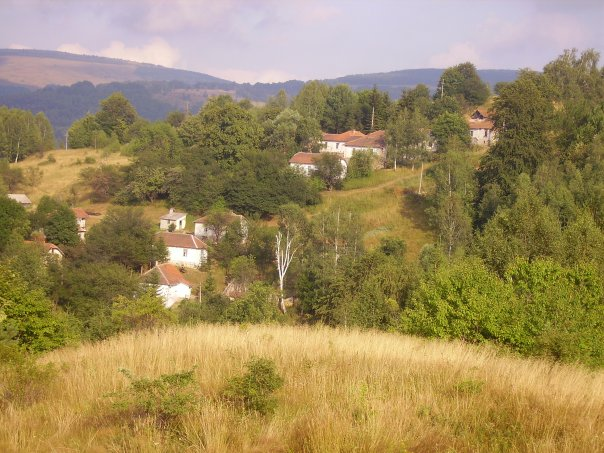

- Location within Serbia
- Coordinates: 43°30′N 22°21′E
- Country: Serbia
- District: Jablanica District
- Municipality: Crna Trava

Population (2002)
  - Total: 25
- Time zone: UTC+1 (CET)
  - Summer (DST): UTC+2 (CEST)

Čuka (Serbian Cyrillic: Чука) is a village in the municipality of Crna Trava, Serbia. According to the 2002 census, the village has a population of 25 people.
