= Darkovce =

Darkovce Дарковце (Serbian)
- Village
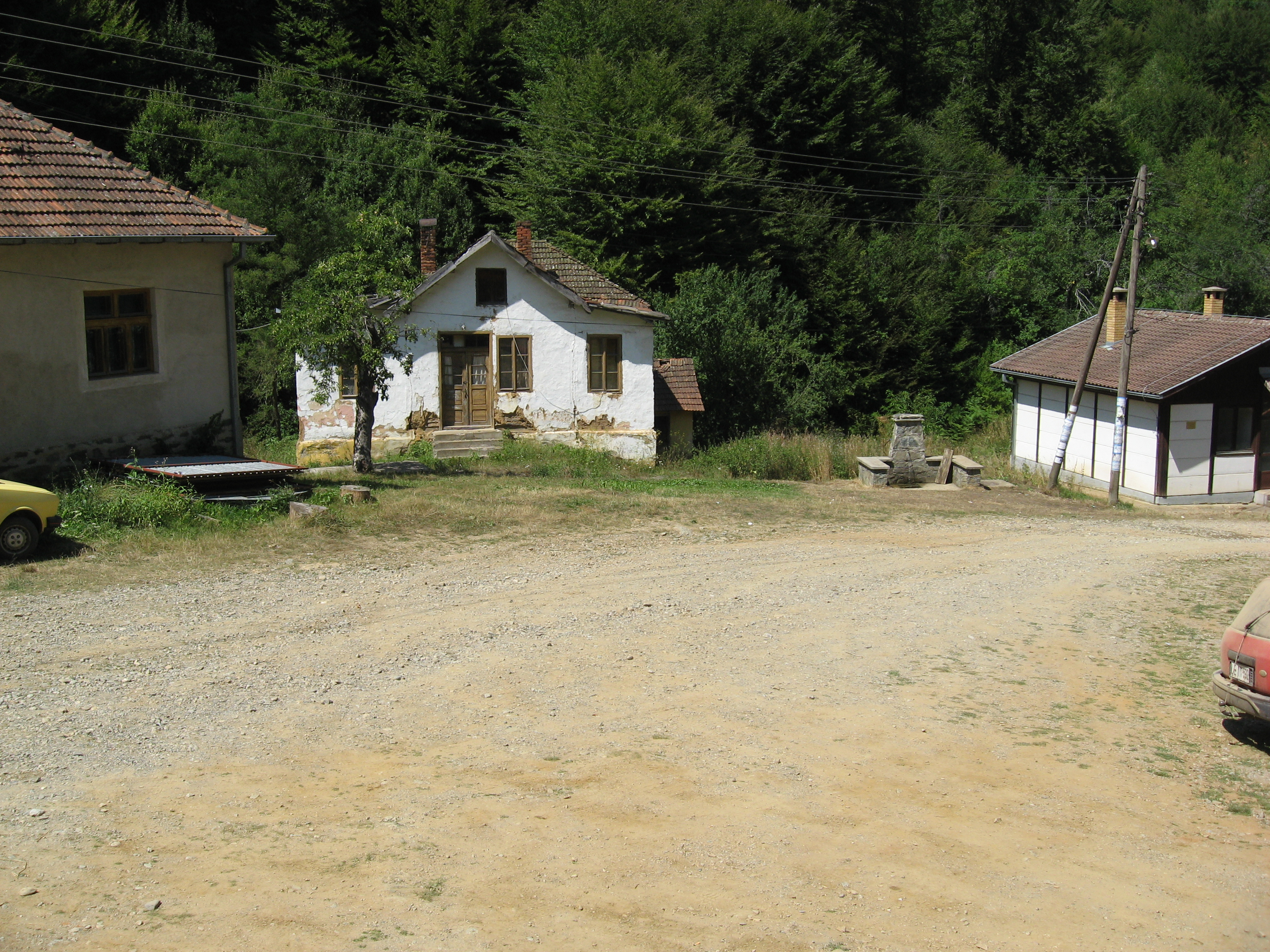

- Location within Serbia
- Coordinates: 42°52′47″N 22°21′06″E
- Country: Serbia
- District: Jablanica District
- Municipality: Crna Trava

Population (2002)
  - Total: 205
- Time zone: UTC+1 (CET)
  - Summer (DST): UTC+2 (CEST)

Darkovce (Serbian Cyrillic: Дарковце) is a village in the municipality of Crna Trava, Serbia. According to the 2002 census, the village has a population of 205 people.
