= Crna Trava =

Crna Trava Црна Трава (Serbian)
- Village and municipality
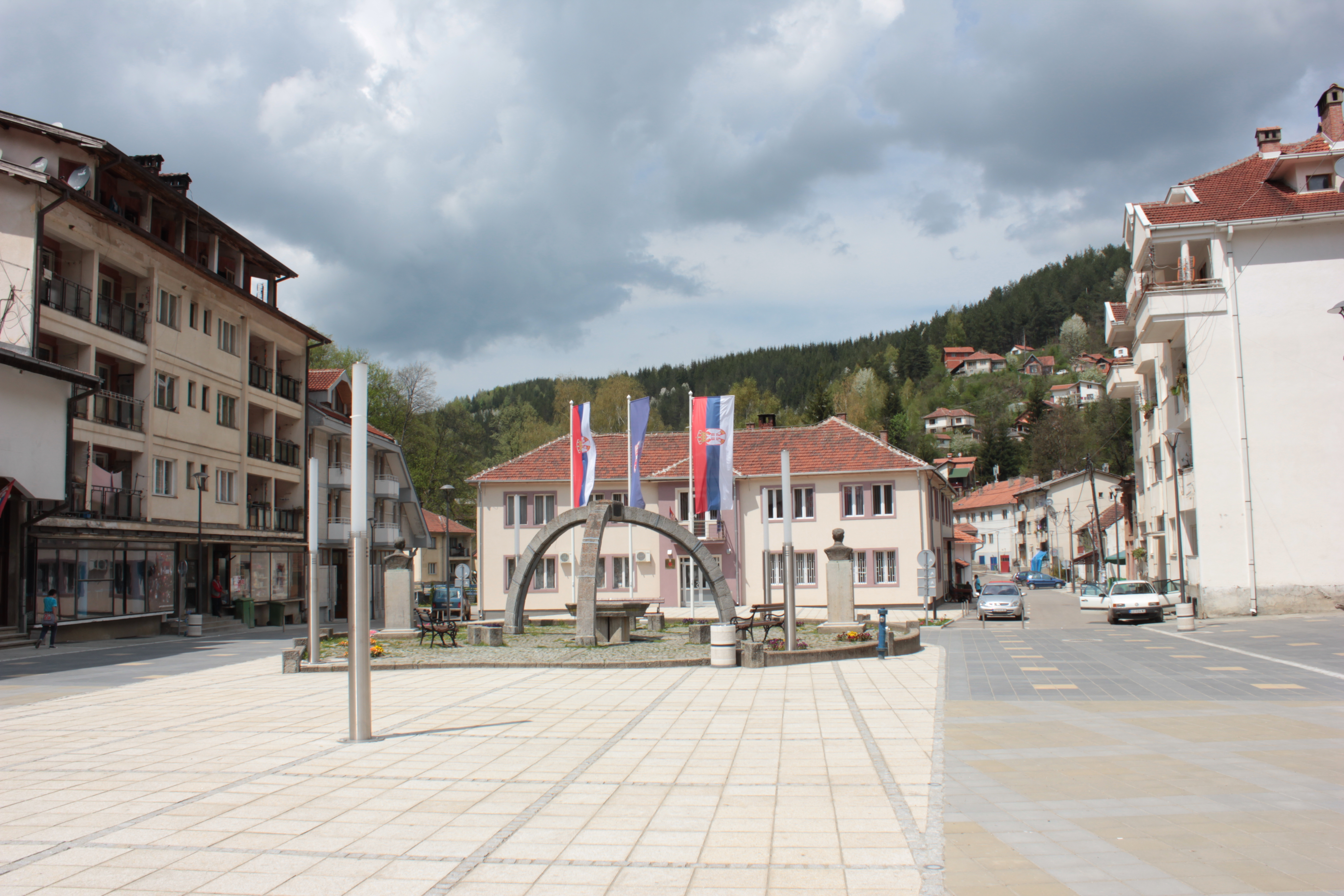
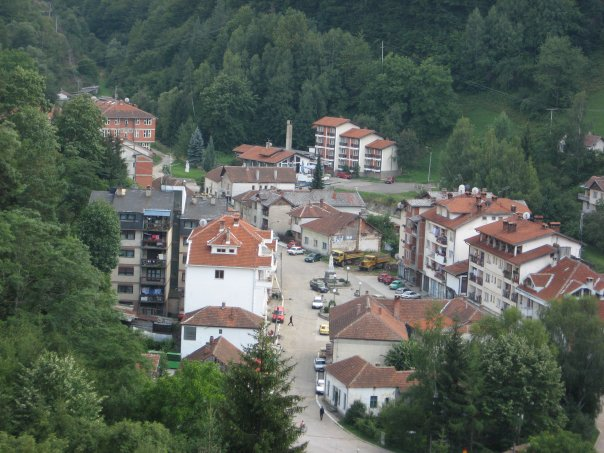
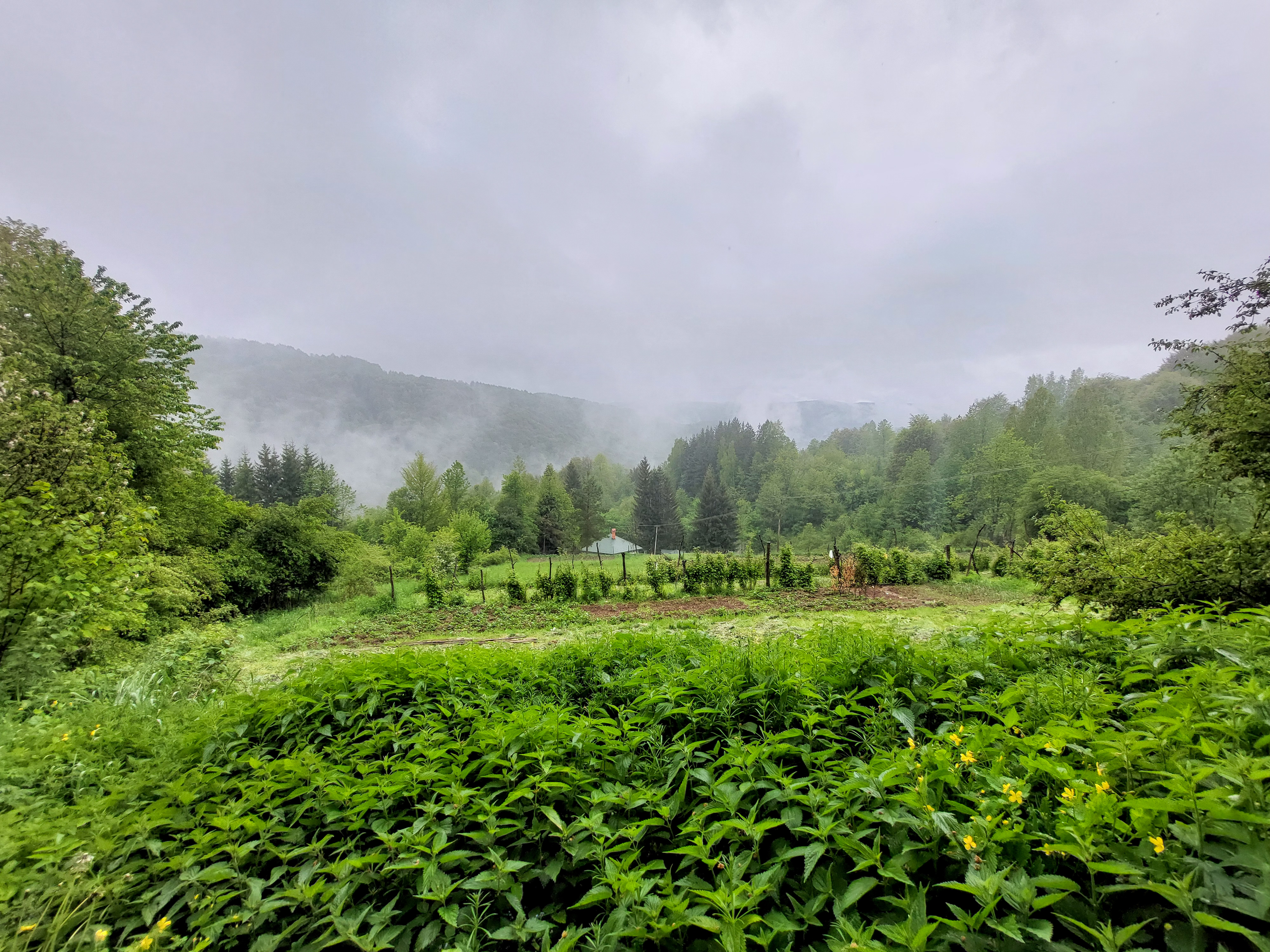
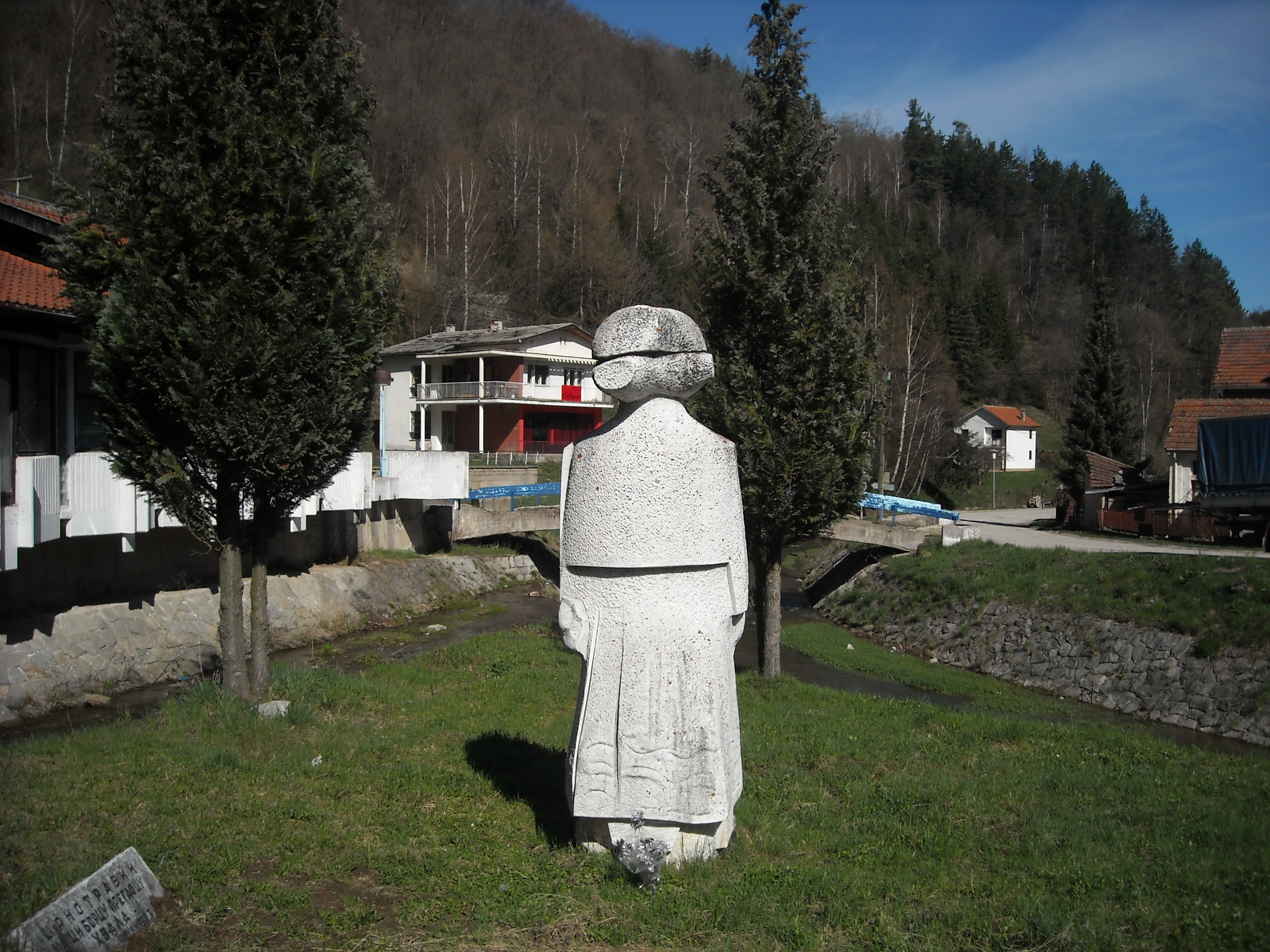
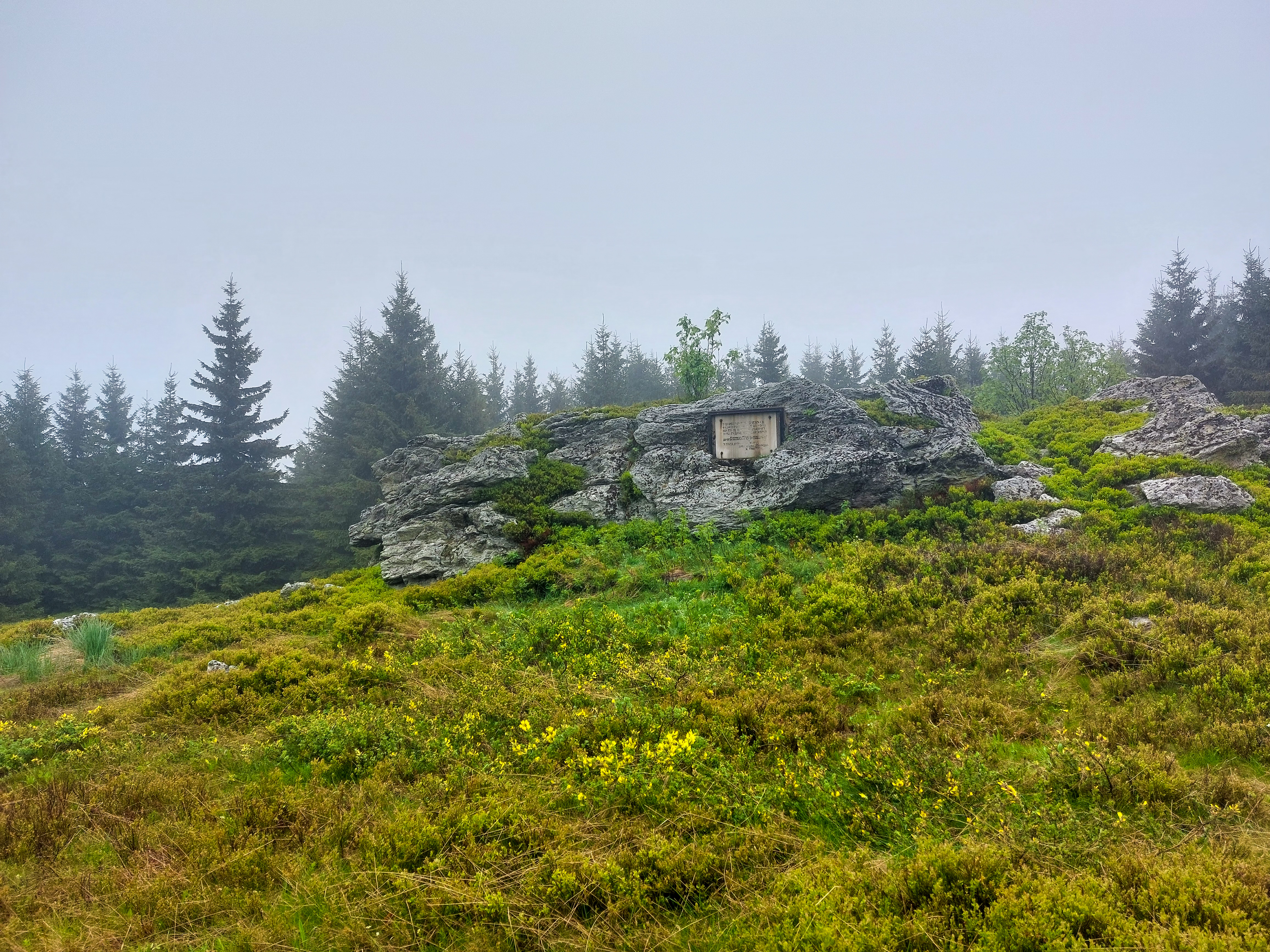
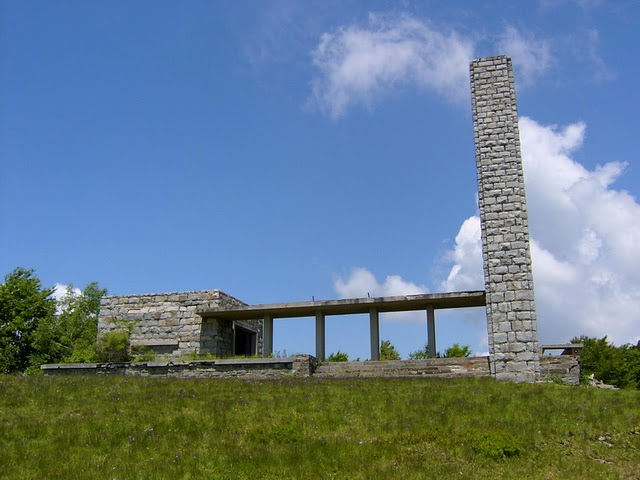

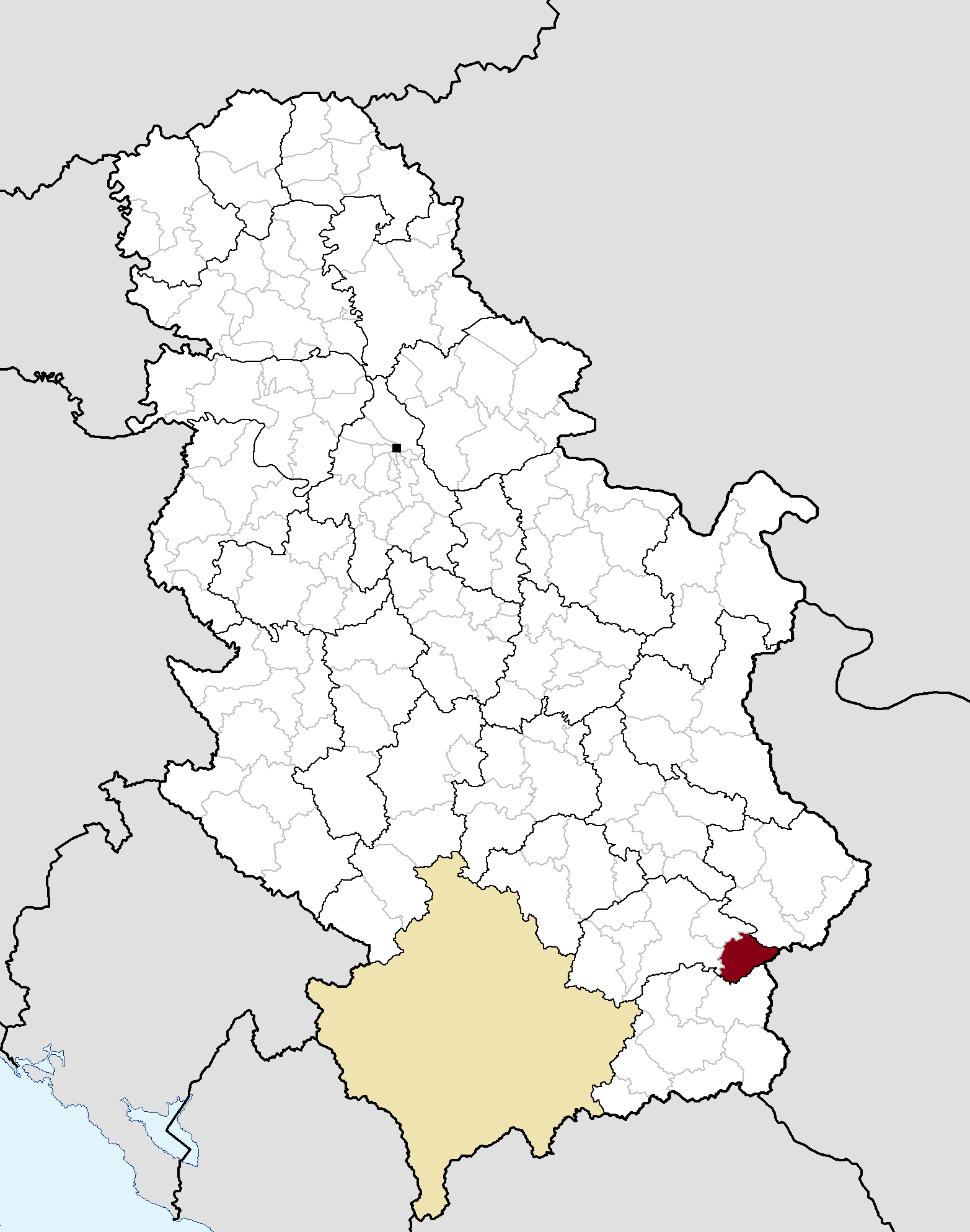
- Location of the municipality of Crna Trava within Serbia
- Coordinates: 42°48′36.53″N 22°17′56.43″E
- Country: Serbia
- Region: Southern and Eastern Serbia
- District: Jablanica
- Settlements: 25

Government
  - Mayor: Slavoljub Blagojević (PSS)

Area
  - Town: 12.23 km^{2} (4.72 sq mi)
  - Municipality: 312 km^{2} (120 sq mi)
- Elevation: 964 m (3,163 ft)

Population (2022 census)
  - Town: 338
  - Town density: 27.6/km^{2} (71.6/sq mi)
  - Municipality: 1,063
  - Municipality density: 3.41/km^{2} (8.82/sq mi)
- Time zone: UTC+1 (CET)
  - Summer (DST): UTC+2 (CEST)
- Postal code: 16215
- Area code: +381(0)16
- Car plates: LE
- Website: www.opstinacrnatrava.org.rs

Crna Trava (Serbian Cyrillic: Црна Трава, pronounced [tsr̩̂ːnaː trǎːʋa]) is a small town and municipality located in the Jablanica District of southern Serbia. According to the 2022 census, the population of the village is 338 inhabitants, while population of the municipality is 1,063. This is the smallest by population and poorest municipality in Serbia.

Crna Trava is famous for its migrant builders, who are considered the best in the region and are colloquially described as "building half of Yugoslavia".

== Name ==
The name of the village in Serbian translates to Black Grass. According to the local myth, the origin of the name dates back to 1389, when Battle of Kosovo took place. A Serbian reserve army unit, composed of Serbian archers and cavaliers, decided to take a rest on a grass field of Vilin Lug ("Fairy Grove") while travelling to the battlefield. Since the flowers and other herbs covering the field were highly poisonous, the soldiers became intoxicated, thereby they did not wake up on time for the battle. Realizing that fact, they cursed the grass that poisoned them, branding it "black" grass. However, there is no historical trace of how the settlement got its name. Variant "Kara kaş" (Turkish for black grass) appeared during the Ottoman period.

== Geography ==
Crna Trava is located 66 km (41 mi) southeast from Leskovac, seat of the Jablanica District. It is situated at the mouth of the Čemernica river into the Vlasina river. The settlement lays in the hollow between the mountains of Čemernik, Ostrozub and Plana. The surrounding landscape is mostly untouched by the urbanization, covered with grass and thick forests which create pleasant micro-climate. The winters, however, are usually harsh in the region. The snowdrifts, especially on the Čemernik mountain, can be up to 3 m (9.8 ft) tall, cutting off the surrounding villages.

== History ==
Illyrian tribes inhabited the area in the 5th century BC. Romans occupied the region in the 2nd century BC and exploited the ores in the vicinity, mining for gold, iron and clay. The region of Crna Trava especially developed during the reign of King Milutin in the 13th and 14th century. The original Church of Saint Nicholas was built in that period, so as the important Crna Trava Monastery. During the reign of Ottoman sultan Suleiman the Magnificent, the monastery was a metochion of Hagia Sophia and Crna Trava had certain benefits from that, as the region was considered a waqf so it wasn't directly ruled by the Turks as the others regions were. The monastery did not survive for long and it is not known to whom it was dedicated. It is speculated that it was located near the Čuka hill, below the Crni Vrh peak.

Surveys began in 2018 and in November 2020 it was announced that the remains of some old monastery were discovered at Orlovac Hill. Remains include altar section, walls and several objects surrounding the central church, in what was apparently a vast religious complex. Some parts were covered by overgrowth, while the rest of the complex was discovered by the underground scanning. It is situated on the barely accessible location, and at an altitude of some 1,400 m (4,600 ft), which would make it one of the highest in Serbia. Local myths kept the memory of the monastery dedicated to Saint Nicholas, like the modern one and even the cadastre books called this locality manastirište ("monastery land"). The location points to the defensive position. The proper archaeological survey will be conducted, but initial conclusions are that the supporting walls along the paths to the monastery are from the Roman period, and that the monastery itself, which likely included a settlement, originates from the 10th century.

== Settlements ==
Aside from the village of Crna Trava, the municipality contains the following villages:

- Bajinci
- Bankovci
- Bistrica
- Brod
- Vus
- Gornje Gare
- Gradska
- Darkovce
- Dobro Polje
- Zlatance
- Jabukovik
- Jovanovce
- Kalna
- Krivi Del
- Krstićevo
- Mlačište
- Obradovce
- Ostrozub
- Pavličina
- Preslap
- Rajčetine
- Ruplje
- Sastav Reka
- Čuka

== Demographics ==
Historical population
Year	Pop.	±% p.a.
1948	13,614	—
1953	12,902	−1.07%
1961	12,319	−0.58%
1971	9,672	−2.39%
1981	6,366	−4.10%
1991	3,789	−5.06%
2002	2,563	−3.49%
2011	1,663	−4.69%
2022	1,063	−3.99%

Crna Trava, along with the rest of Vlasina region, suffers from heavy depopulation, chiefly for economic reasons. The municipality had a population of 13,614 in 1948 and 1,339 in 2016. The settlement had a population of 2,798 in 1921 and 434 in 2011.

Though achieving a municipal status already in 1876 and being famous for its construction workers, Crna Trava gained a notoriety of being the most depopulated part of Serbia for decades. It is estimated that in 2017 there are 30,000 people originating from Crna Trava who today live in the capital of Serbia, Belgrade.

=== Ethnic groups ===
The ethnic composition of the municipality:

Ethnic group	Census 2011		Census 2022	
Ethnic group	Population	%	Population	%
Serbs	1,641	98.7	1,034	97.3
Bulgarians	5	0.30	1	0.10
Gorani	3	0.18	..	..
Russians	2	0.12	1	0.10
Others	12	0.72	27	2.54
Total	1,663		1,063	

== Economy ==
The following table gives a preview of total number of registered people employed in legal entities per their core activity (as of 2022):

Activity	Total
Agriculture, forestry and fishing	25
Mining and quarrying	-
Manufacturing	54
Electricity, gas, steam and air conditioning supply	10
Water supply; sewerage, waste management and remediation activities	8
Construction	448
Wholesale and retail trade, repair of motor vehicles and motorcycles	13
Transportation and storage	8
Accommodation and food services	-
Information and communication	13
Financial and insurance activities	-
Real estate activities	-
Professional, scientific and technical activities	28
Administrative and support service activities	1
Public administration and defense; compulsory social security	70
Education	75
Human health and social work activities	32
Arts, entertainment and recreation	2
Other service activities	6
Individual agricultural workers	8
Total	804

=== Builders ===
Crna Trava is famous for its construction workers. For decades they travelled through Serbia and Yugoslavia, worked on the construction sites and the male variant of the demonym, Crnotravac (plural Crnotravci), became a synonym for a good builder. Many companies bare that name, even though they are not located in Crna Trava. They became known as dunđeri (singular dunđer; after Turkish dülger [from Persian durūger] meaning builder) and the word in time entered Serbian language as a synonym for builder.

Crnotravci excelled in all types of construction works, like carpentry or bricklaying. For the most part they were self-educated, passing the skills from generation to generation. The craft originated from the Ottoman period, when there several metal mines, including iron and lead. Local residents began to construct the facilities needed to treat the ore and extract metals, and then began building houses for themselves. In the first half of the 19th century, the Ottoman allowed the Serbs to restore damaged and build new churches so the builders from Crna Trava began to migrate and work on construction sites. Originally, they spread in the surrounding, southern region (Vlasotince, Leskovac, Niš, Aleksinac), but then they began to move to central and northern part of Serbia (Paraćin, Kragujevac, Belgrade), but also worked in Romania and Bulgaria. They arrived in Belgrade in 1820.

They built everything, from kafanas to public and government buildings. Their central gathering point was Belgrade, where they gathered in the kafana "Kikevac" in the Čubura neighborhood. Belgrade has the oldest attested construction done by the Crnotravci: building of the kafana "Dva Jelena" in the neighborhood of Skadarlija, with the surviving inscription "this building was built by the big-mustached Đorđe Crnotravac in 1832". Number of migrant workers continued to grow in the next decades, and in 1906 it was recorded that the Crnotravci made 80% of all construction workers in Belgrade.

State decided to utilize the already existing craftsmanship of the population, so it organized annual building-stonecutting course in Crna Trava, from 1920 to 1926. The courses, headed by the professors and engineers from Belgrade, later grew into the State Construction-Artisan School which was operation until World War II. It was reopened in 1947 as the Secondary Construction High School, which was closed in 1956. It was then reopened again in 1964.

On the location of the former "Kikevac" kafana, where Čubura Park is located today, a monument dedicated to the builders was erected in June 2019. The 2.25 m (7 ft 5 in) tall sculpture on the stone pedestal represents nameless "Crna Trava builder" (Crnotravac neimar). Work of Zoran Kuzmanović, the duplicate was dedicated in Crna Trava itself.

Some of the numerous object built by the Crnotravci are:

- Princess Ljubica's Residence (1830; Belgrade)
- Kafana Dva Jelena (1832; Belgrade)
- Banovina (1882; Niš)
- Stari dvor (1884; Belgrade)
- Belgrade Main railway station (1884; Belgrade)
- National Theatre in Niš (1906; Niš)
- Hotel Moskva (1908; Belgrade)
- Hotel Bristol (1912; Belgrade)
- Novi dvor (1922; Belgrade)
- University of Belgrade Faculty of Philology (1922; Belgrade)
- Military Museum (1924; Belgrade)
- Students Polyclinic (1924; Belgrade)
- Belgrade University Library (1926; Belgrade)
- Government of Serbia (1928; Belgrade)
- Archive of Serbia (1928; Belgrade)
- Oplenac (1930; Topola)
- Guards Home (1931; Belgrade)
- National Bank in Bitola (1931; Bitola, North Macedonia)
- Radio Belgrade (1933; Belgrade)
- Historical Museum of Serbia (1934; Belgrade)
- Air Force Command Building, Belgrade (1935; Zemun)
- Small Church of Saint Sava (1935; Belgrade)
- High School of Mechanical Engineering (1936; Sarajevo, Bosnia and Herzegovina)
- House of the National Assembly of the Republic of Serbia (1936; Belgrade)
- University of Belgrade Faculty of Law (1937; Belgrade)
- Royal Compound (1937; Belgrade)
- Belgrade University Faculty of Veterinary Medicine (1939; Belgrade)
- University Children's Clinic (1940; Belgrade)
- University of Belgrade Faculty of Philosophy (1974; Belgrade)
- Memorial Ossuary in Bizerte (Bizerte, Tunisia)

== Tourism ==
Tourism is not developed, even though Crna Trava is only 10 km (6.2 mi) away from the Lake Vlasina. The average altitude of the surrounding area is 1,300 m (4,300 ft) and combined with the climate, produces a clean, fresh air and the growth of the still wild grown strawberries, raspberries and blueberries so as mushrooms and herbal plants. The forests are rich in game and the mountains are suitable for winter sports, but these types of tourism are not developed either.

=== Church of Saint Nicholas ===
The Church of Saint Nicholas was originally built during the reign of King Milutin, c. 1300, but was destroyed later. The new church was built on its foundations in 1635. In 2011 bishop of Niš, Jovan Purić, gave his blessing for restoration of the church and continuance of the service. It had no service held from 1942 to 2012 and no resident priest from 1946 to 2019. On the day of Saint Procopius of Scythopolis, on 21 July, an annual regional festivity is held at the church. Construction of the clergy house next to the church began.

=== Monuments ===
Crnotravka

In order to mark the devotion of the wives of the Crnotravac builders, who stayed at home and took care of children and households, a monument was erected. Work of Sava Halugin, officially named Zahvalnost ("gratitude"), it is colloquially often referred to as Crnotravka, the female demonym. The monument is located at the confluence of the Čemerčica river into the Vlasina, in front of the "Vilin Lug" hotel, and was dedicated on 4 July 1983. The inscription says: Woman of Crna Trava, mother, fighter, striver.

Crnotravac

On 29 October 2019 a monument dedicated to the builders was erected in the village. The 2.25 m (7 ft 5 in) tall sculpture on the stone pedestal represents nameless "Crna Trava builder" (Crnotravac neimar).It was sculptured by Zoran Kuzmanović. In June 2019 the original was dedicated in Belgrade's Čubura Park, when it was announced that the duplicate of the same monument will be erected in Crna Travam too.

== Culture and education ==
The first school, succeeded today by the modern elementary school "Aleksandar Stojanović", was founded in the first half of the 19th century. The school has outposts in the surrounding villages of Krivi Del, Gradska and Sastav Reka. There is also the secondary school "Milentije Popović", founded in 1919. It is a technical vocational school for construction-geodetic technicians - geometers. The school has a dormitory for its students. In order to revive the settlement, because of the massive depopulation, the schoolbooks, lodging and food are free for all students.

The only cultural institution in the village is the library "Sestre Stojanović", with 26,000 books. Since 2017, the library has an electronic classroom. The first reading room in Crna Trava was founded in 1804, while the present library was formed in 1996.

== Gallery ==
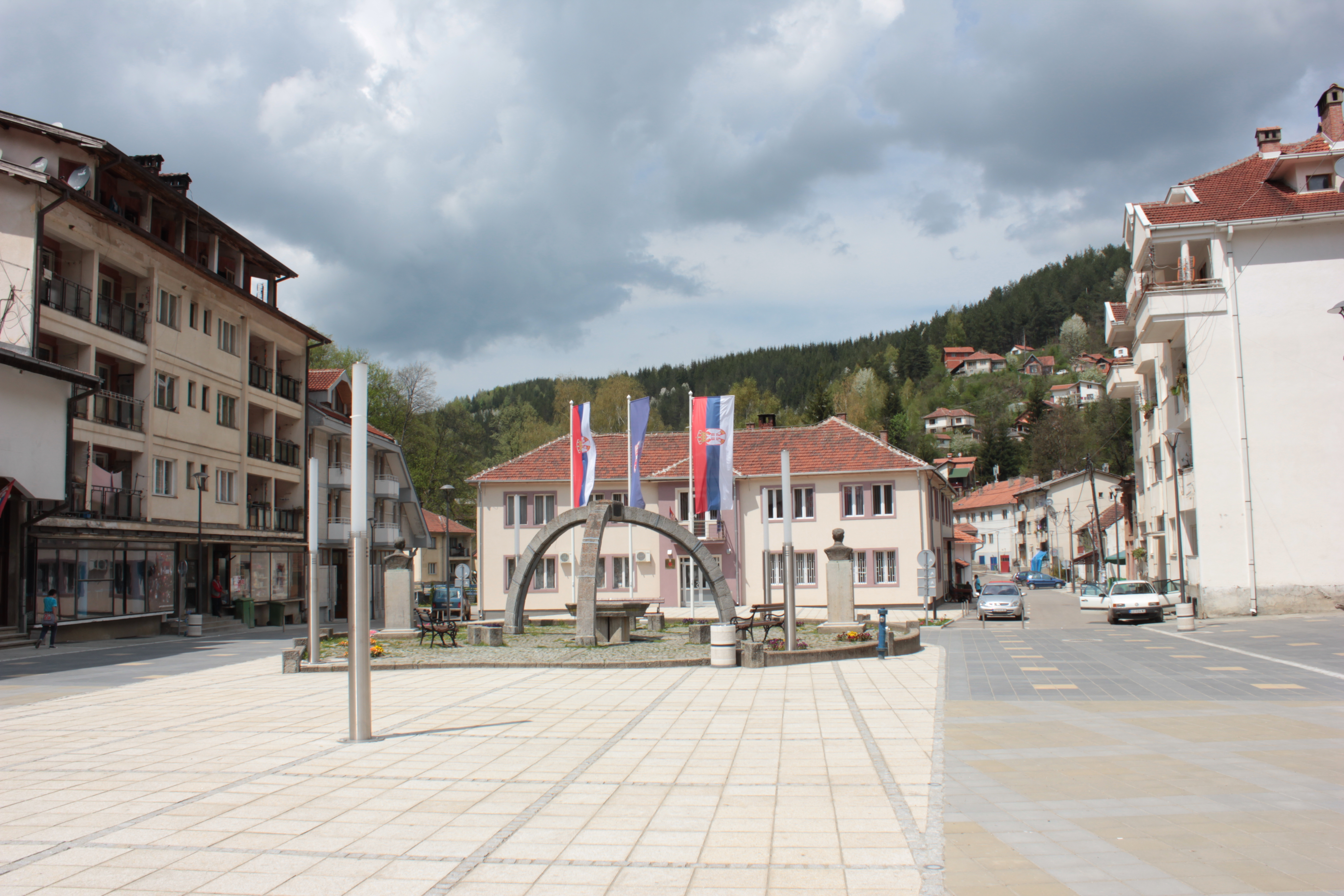
Village center

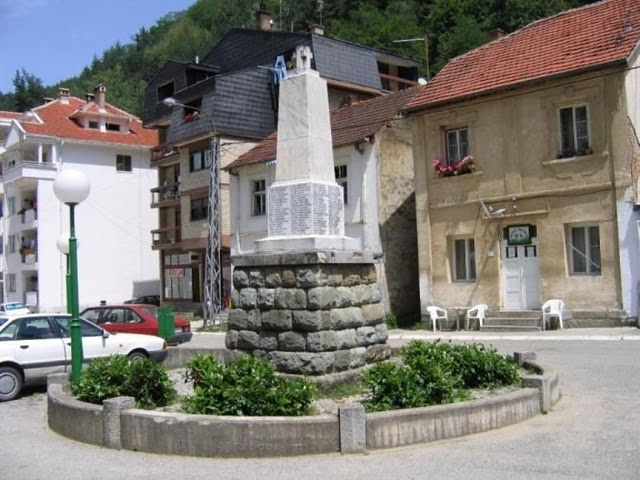
Monument in village center

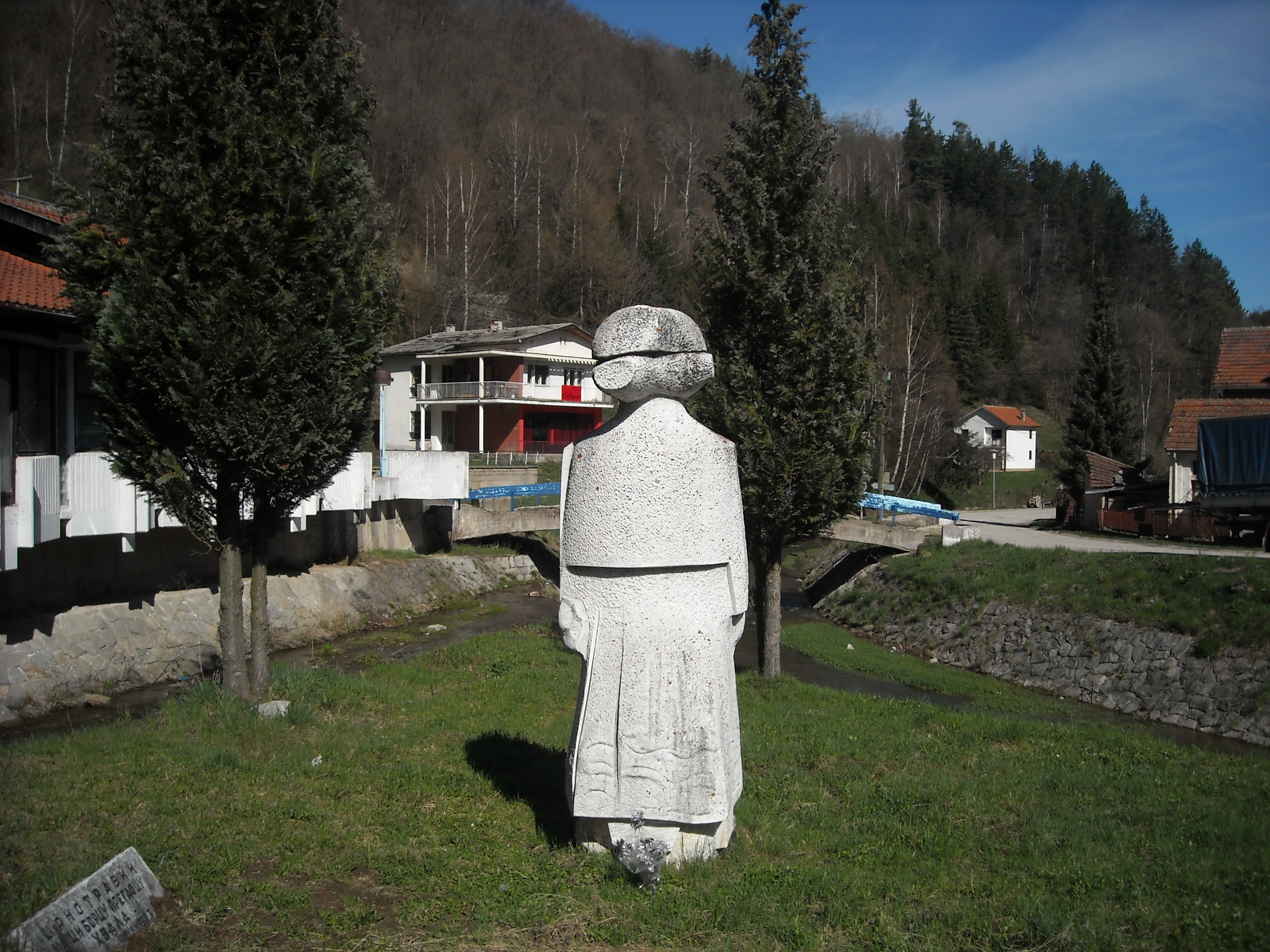
Monument "Zahvalnost" ("Crnotravka")

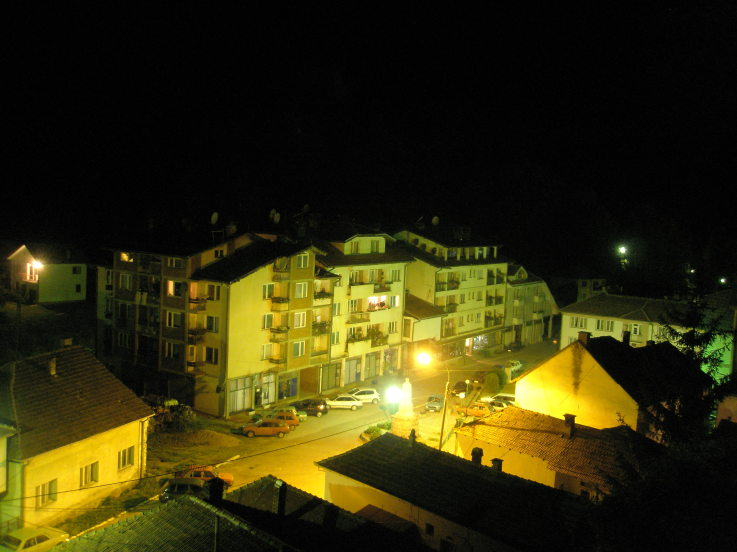
Village center at night

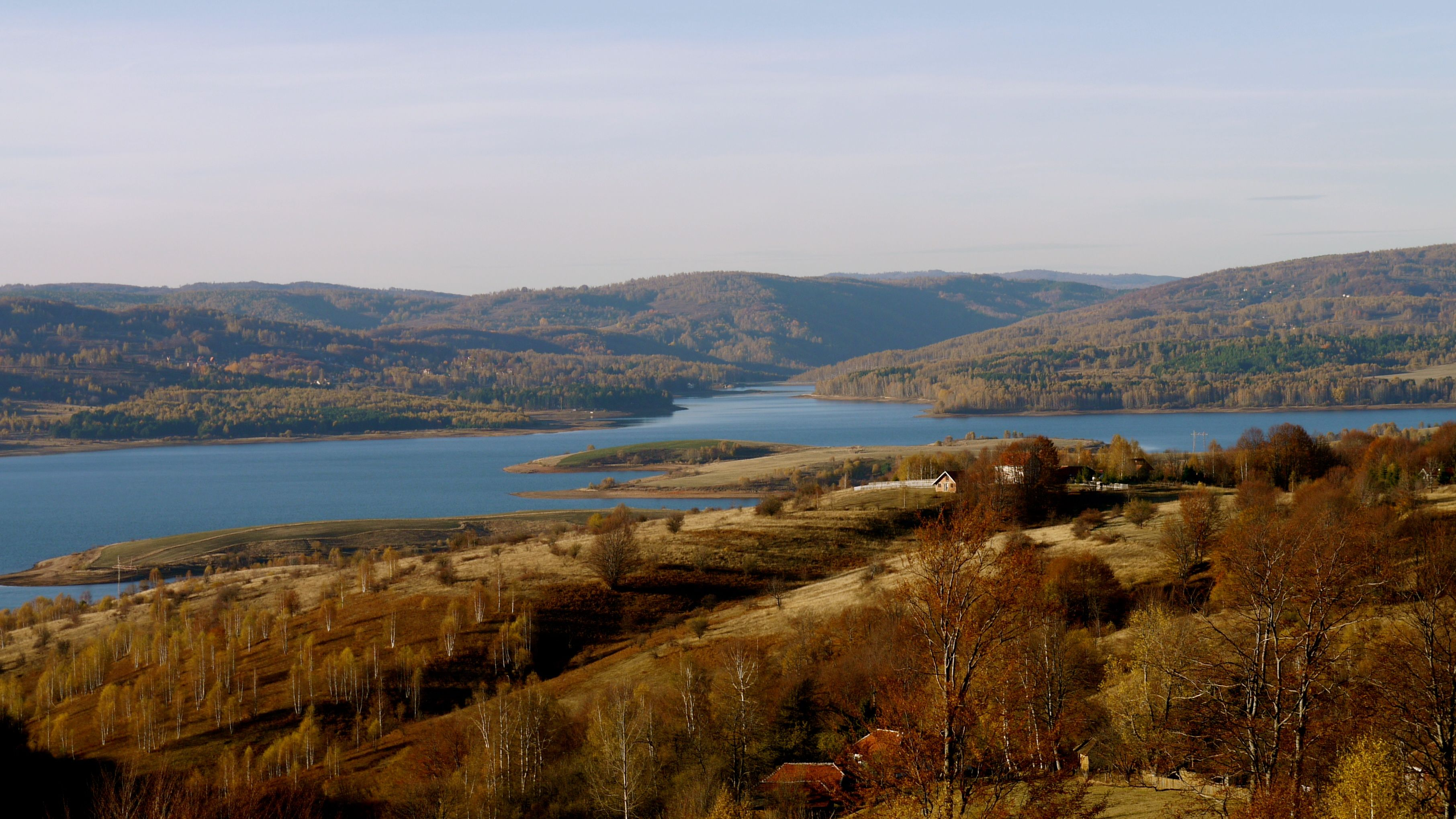
Vlasina Lake near Crna Trava

== See also ==
- Subdivisions of Serbia
