= Gradska (Crna Trava) =

Gradska Градска (Serbian)
- Village
- Location within Serbia
- Coordinates: 42°52′30″N 21°23′55″E
- Country: Serbia
- District: Jablanica District
- Municipality: Crna Trava

Population (2011)
  - Total: 254
- Time zone: UTC+1 (CET)
  - Summer (DST): UTC+2 (CEST)

Gradska is a village in the municipality of Crna Trava, Serbia. According to the 2011 census, the village has a population of 254 people, down from 337 in 2002.
