= Ostrozub =

Mountain in Serbia

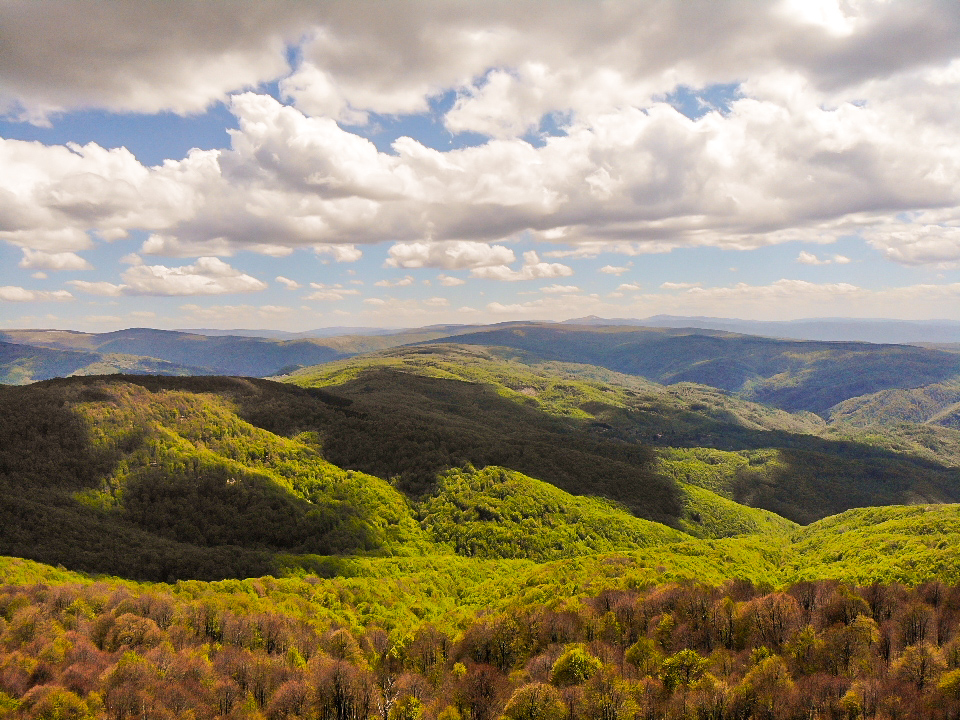

Highest point
- Elevation: 1,546 m (5,072 ft)
- Coordinates: 42°52′56″N 22°14′51″E

Geography
- Location within Serbia
- Location: Southern Serbia
- Parent range: Rhodope Mountains

Ostrozub (Serbian Cyrillic: Острозуб) is a mountain in southern Serbia, near the town of Crna Trava. It forms a continuous range with Čemernik mountain. Its highest peak, Ostrozupska čuka, has an elevation of 1,546 meters above sea level.

== Gallery ==
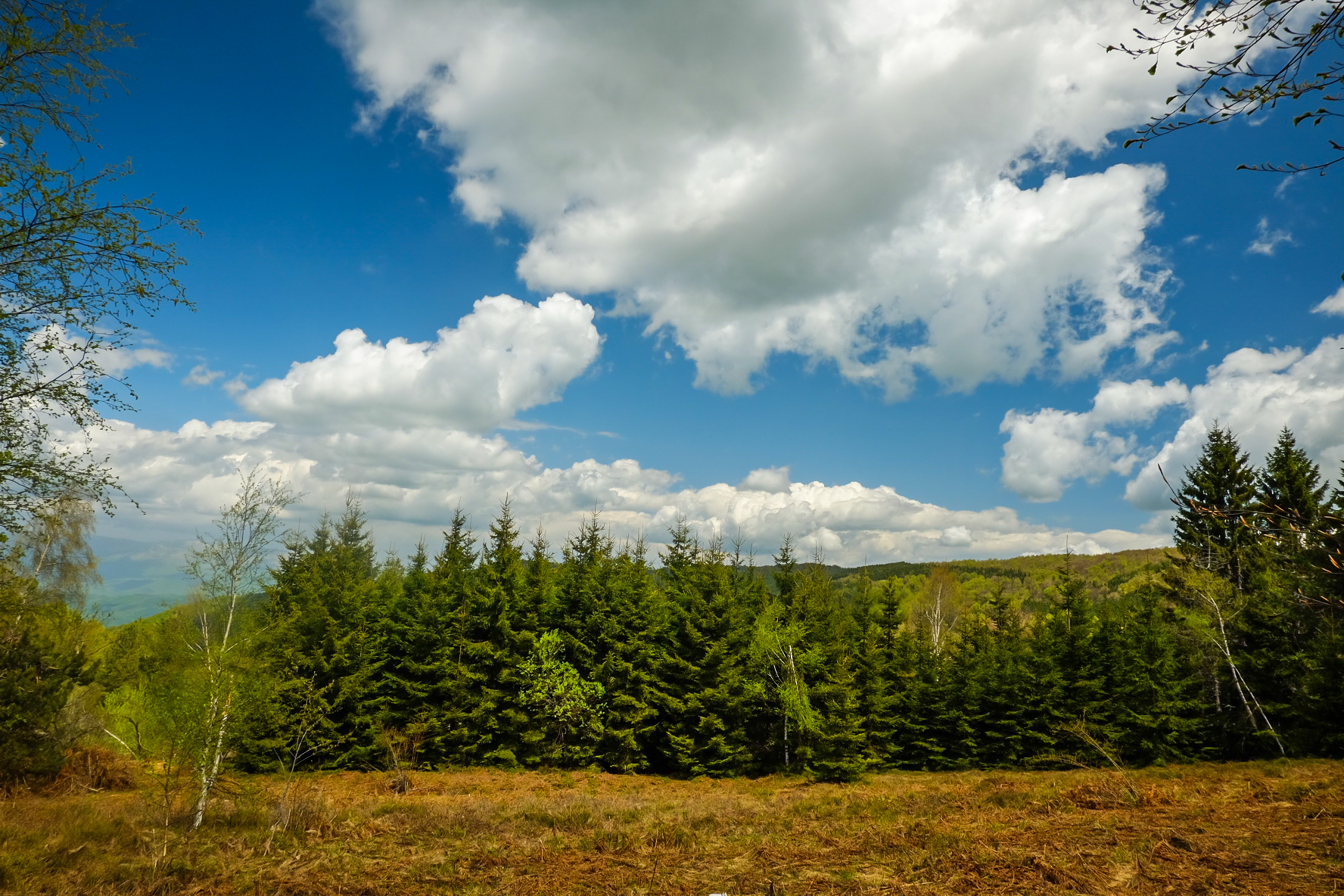

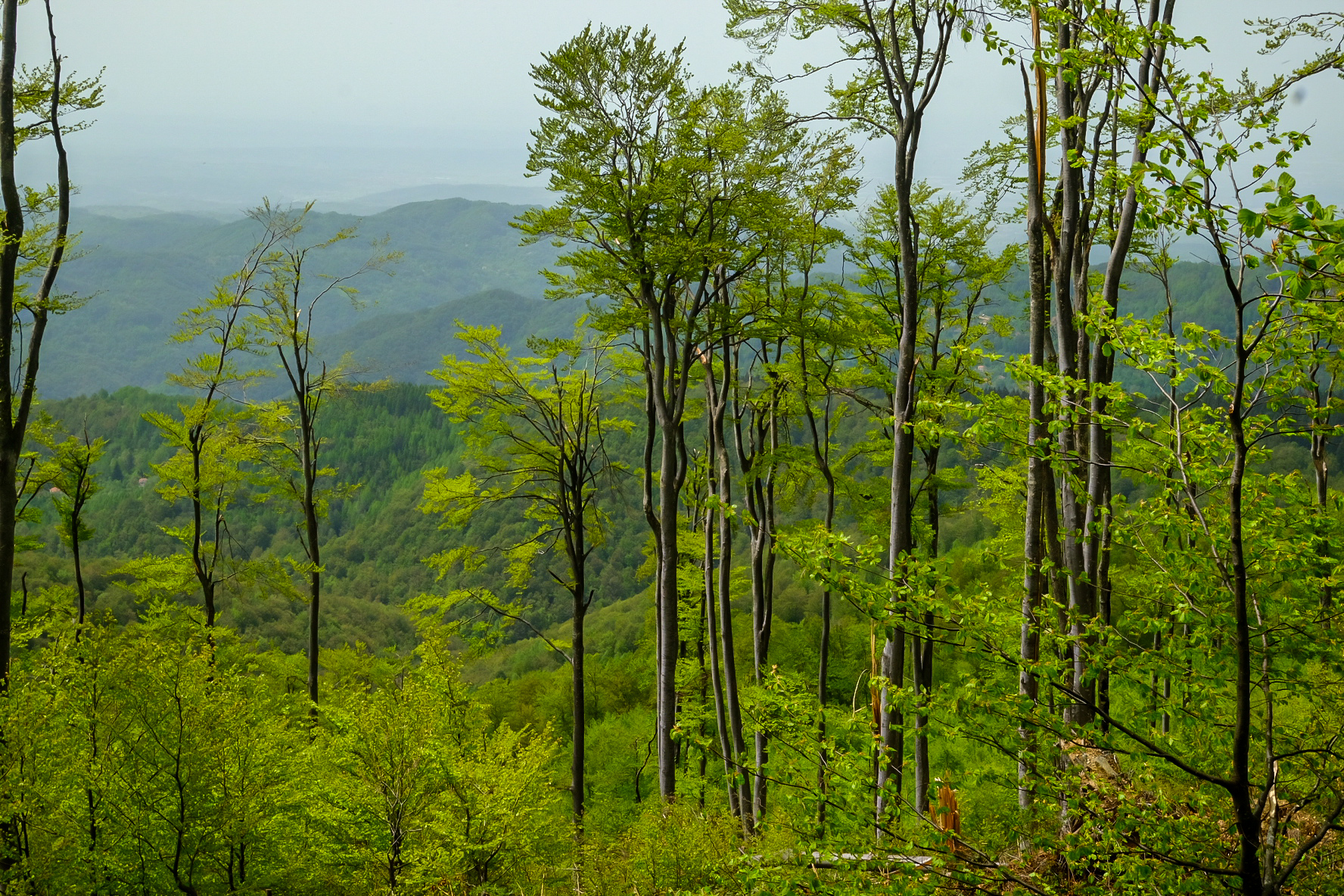

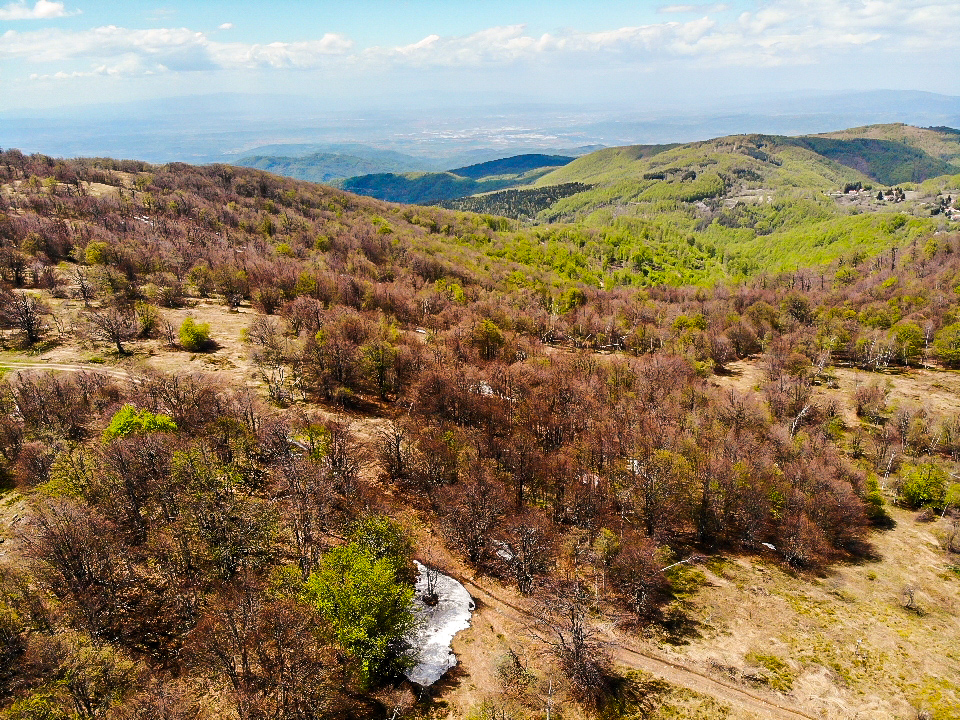

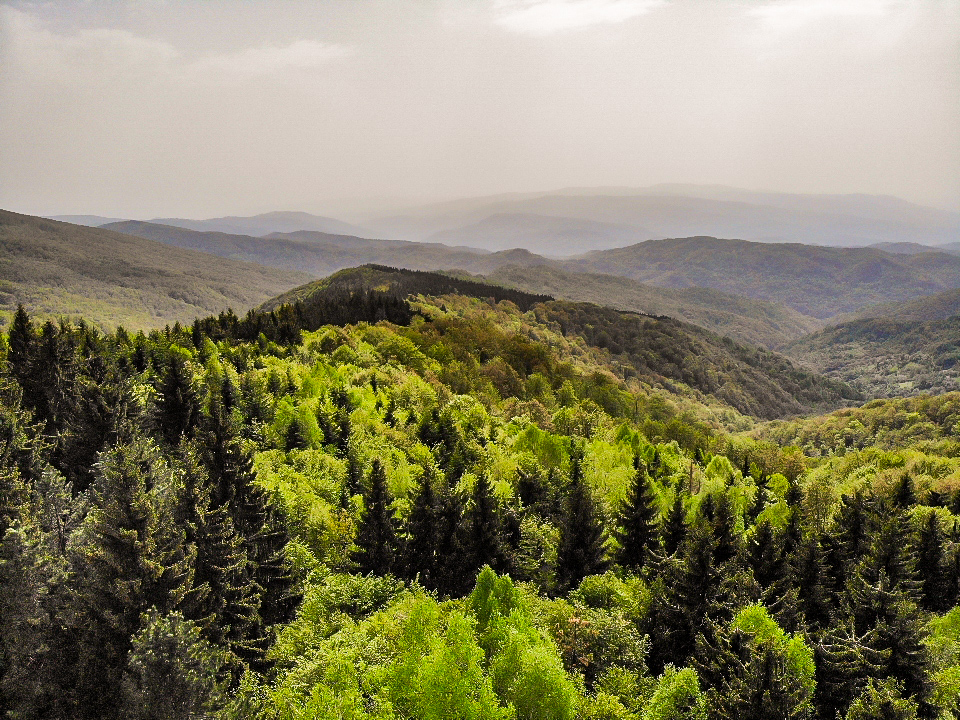

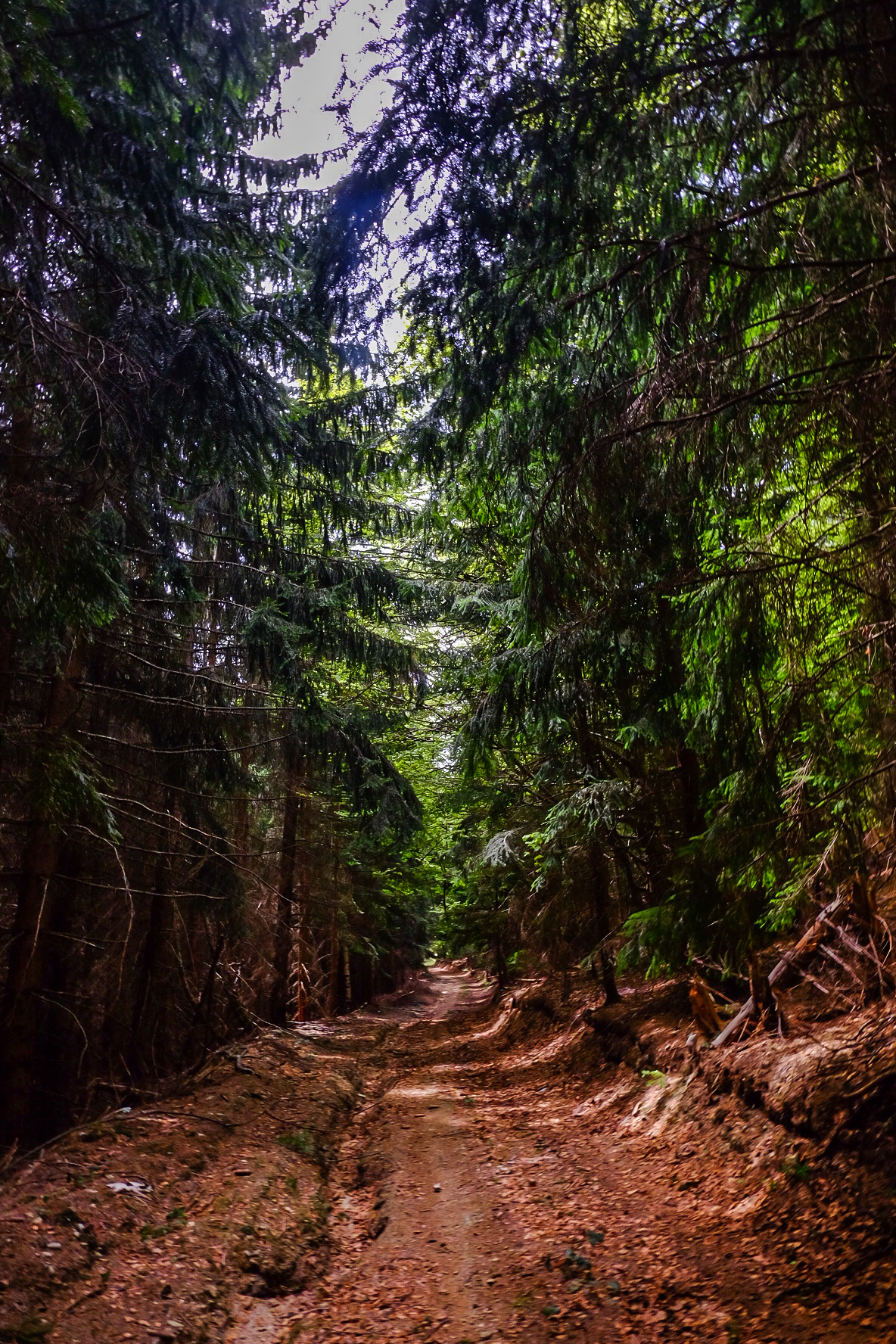

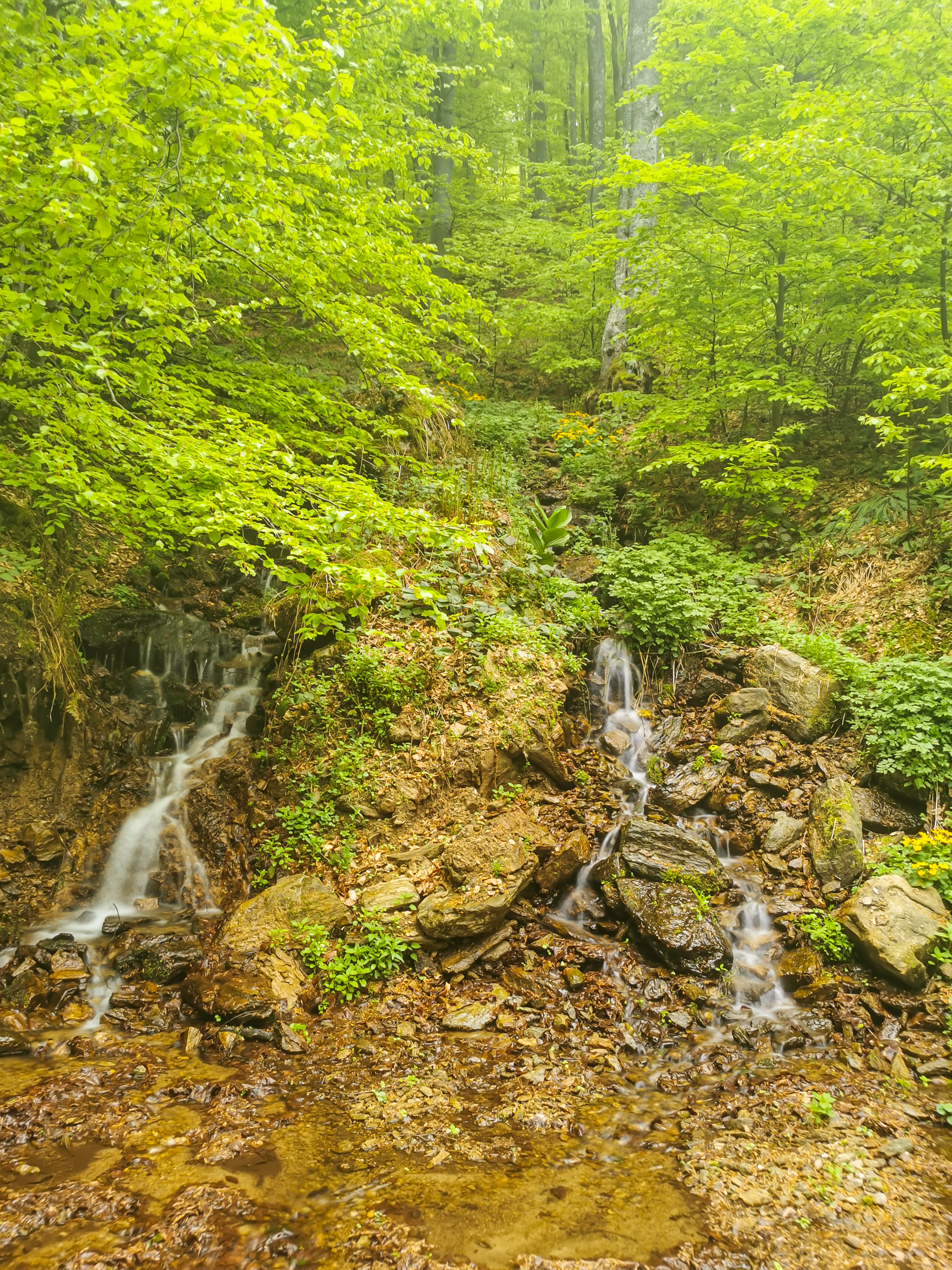

== See also ==
- List of mountains in Serbia
