= Krivi Del =

Krivi Del Криви Дел (Serbian)
- Village
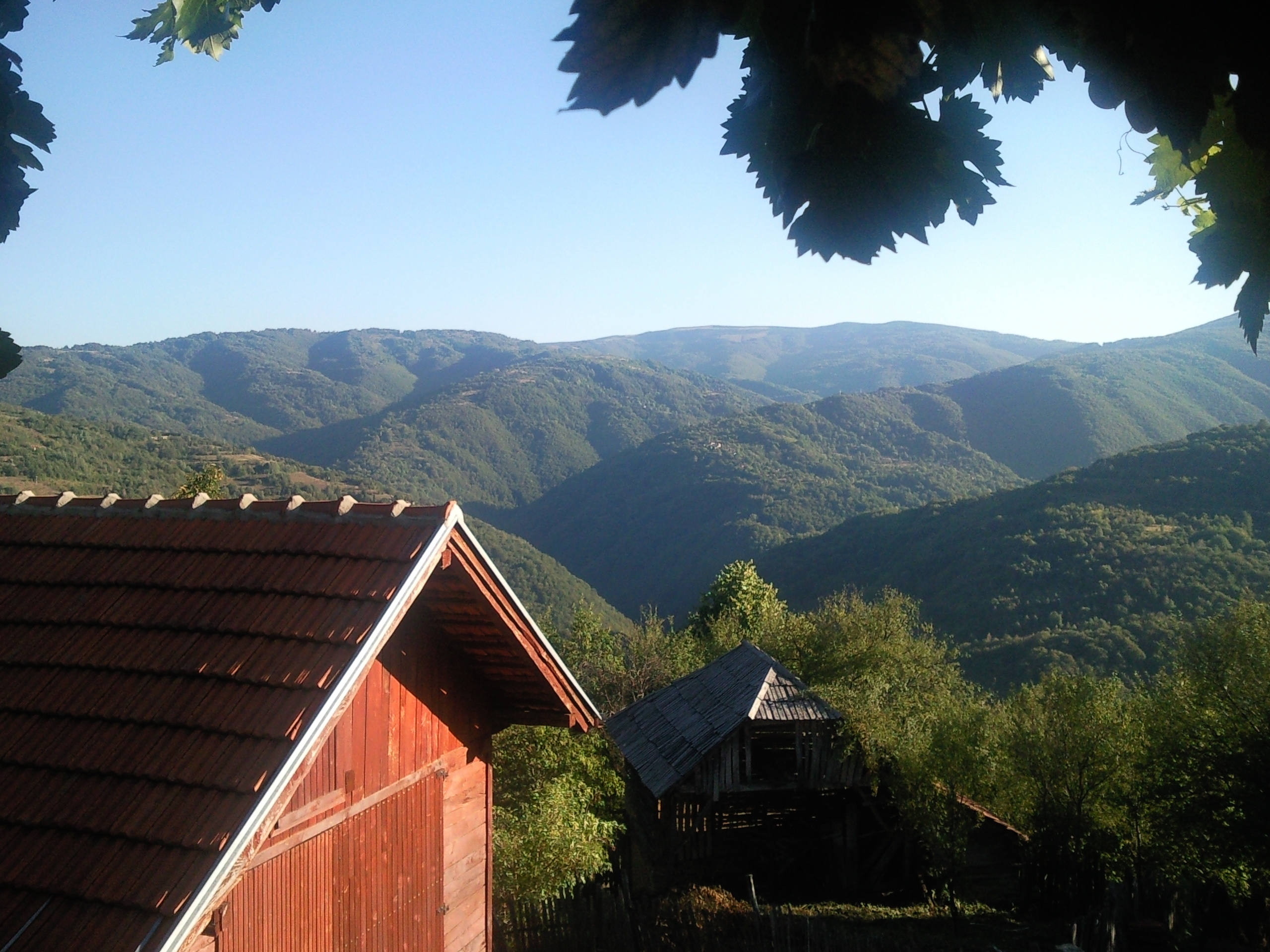
- View of the Vlasine Valley from Krivi Del

- Location within Serbia
- Coordinates: 42°55′14″N 22°20′31″E
- Country: Serbia
- District: Jablanica District
- Municipality: Crna Trava

Population (2002)
  - Total: 198
- Time zone: UTC+1 (CET)
  - Summer (DST): UTC+2 (CEST)

Krivi Del (Serbian Cyrillic: Криви Дел) is a village in the municipality of Crna Trava, Serbia. According to the 2002 census, the village has a population of 198 people.
