= Gornje Gare =

Gornje Gare Горње Гаре (Serbian)
- Village
- Location within Serbia
- Coordinates: 42°55′26″N 22°19′48″E
- Country: Serbia
- District: Jablanica District
- Municipality: Crna Trava

Population (2002)
  - Total: 80
- Time zone: UTC+1 (CET)
  - Summer (DST): UTC+2 (CEST)

Gornje Gare (Serbian Cyrillic: Горње Гаре) is a village in the municipality of Crna Trava, Serbia. According to the 2002 census, the village has a population of 80 people.
