= Krstićevo =

Krstićevo Крстићево (Serbian)
- Village
- Location within Serbia
- Coordinates: 42°52′34″N 22°17′27″E
- Country: Serbia
- District: Jablanica District
- Municipality: Crna Trava

Population (2002)
  - Total: 24
- Time zone: UTC+1 (CET)
  - Summer (DST): UTC+2 (CEST)

Krstićevo (Serbian Cyrillic: Крстићево) is a village in the municipality of Crna Trava, Serbia. According to the 2002 census, the village has a population of 24 people.
