= Jovanovce =

Jovanovce Јовановце (Serbian)
- Village
- Location within Serbia
- Coordinates: 42°47′03″N 22°17′13″E
- Country: Serbia
- District: Jablanica District
- Municipality: Crna Trava

Population (2011)
  - Total: 27
- Time zone: UTC+1 (CET)
  - Summer (DST): UTC+2 (CEST)

Jovanovce (Serbian Cyrillic: Јовановце) is a village in the municipality of Crna Trava, Serbia. According to the 2002 census, the village has a population of 27 people.
