= Srđan Obradović =

Serbian footballer

Personal information
- Full name: Srđan Obradović
- Date of birth: 16 March 1970 (age 56)
- Place of birth: Belgrade, FPR Yugoslavia
- Height: 1.88 m (6 ft 2 in)
- Position: Defender

Senior career*
Years	Team	Apps	(Gls)
1988–1995	OFK Beograd	128	(0)
1995–1996	Braga	11	(0)
1996–1998	Utrecht	13	(0)
1998–1999	OFK Beograd	7	(0)
1999–2000	Panserraikos	15	(3)
2000	Rabotnički Kometal	12	(0)
2001	Lombard Tatabánya	11	(0)
2001	Napredak Kruševac	15	(3)
2002	Lombard-Pápa		
2002	Haladás	4	(0)
2003	Radnički Pirot		
2003–2004	Morava		
2004–2007	SFS Borac		
- * Club domestic league appearances and goals

Srđan Obradović (Serbian Cyrillic: Cpђaн Oбpaдoвић; born 16 March 1970 in Belgrade) is a Serbian former football defender.

== Career ==
Besides Serbian top league club OFK Beograd where he played most of his career, he also played for several other clubs, including Serbian Napredak and Radnički Pirot, Portuguese Liga club Braga, Eredivisie club FC Utrecht, Greek Beta Ethniki club Panserraikos, Macedonian First League club Rabotnički Kometal and Hungarian First and Second league clubs Lombard FC Tatabánya, Lombard-Pápa and Haladás Szombathelyi.

== External sources ==
- Srđan Obradović at Magyar Futball (in Hungarian)
- Srđan Obradović at ForaDeJogo (archived)
