= Obradovce =

Obradovce Обрадовце (Serbian)
- Village
- Location within Serbia
- Coordinates: 42°49′18″N 22°16′39″E
- Country: Serbia
- District: Jablanica District
- Municipality: Crna Trava

Population (2002)
  - Total: 31
- Time zone: UTC+1 (CET)
  - Summer (DST): UTC+2 (CEST)

Obradovce (Serbian Cyrillic: Обрадовце) is a village in the municipality of Crna Trava, Serbia. According to the 2002 census, the village has a population of 31 people.
