= Vardenik (mountain) =

Mountain in Serbia

Highest point
- Elevation: 1,875 m (6,152 ft)
- Coordinates: 42°37′36″N 22°16′02″E

Geography
- Location within Serbia
- Location: Southern Serbia
- Parent range: Rhodope Mountains

Vardenik (Serbian Cyrillic: Варденик) is a mountain in southern Serbia, near the town of Surdulica. Its highest peak, Veliki Strešer, has an elevation of 1,875 meters above sea level. Vardenik surrounds the Vlasina plateau and Vlasina Lake along with Čemernik and Gramada.

== See also ==
- List of mountains in Serbia
