= Floating island =

Island (natural or artificial) made of floating plants, mud, and peat

Natural floating island on small lake in Finnish Lakeland

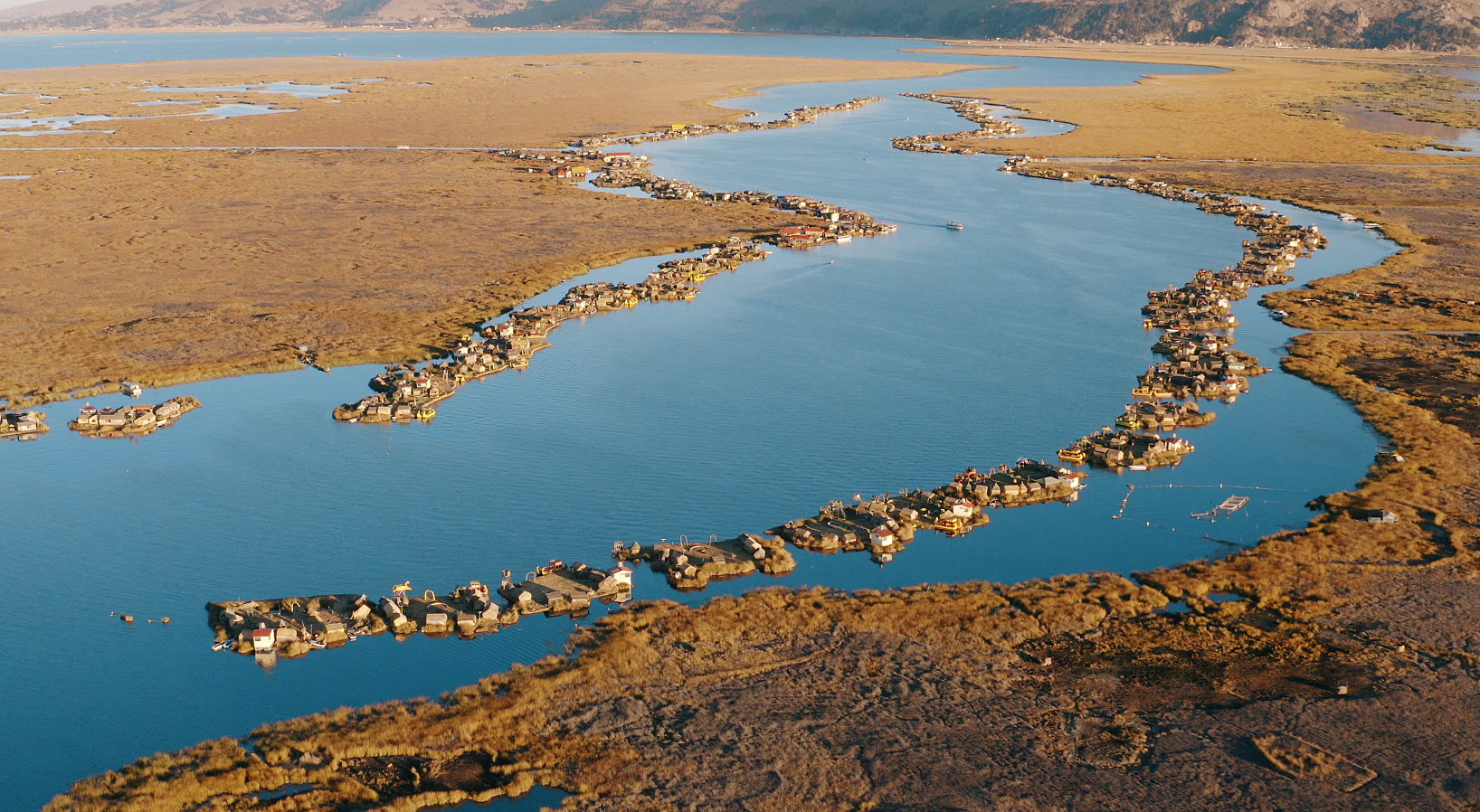
Artificial floating island communities of the Uru peoples in Lake Titicaca

A floating island is a mass of floating aquatic plants, mud, and peat ranging in thickness from several centimeters to a few meters. Sometimes referred to as tussocks, floatons, or suds, floating islands are found in many parts of the world. They exist less commonly as an artificial island. Floating islands are generally found on marshlands, lakes, and similar wetland locations, and can be many hectares in size.

== Natural occurrences ==
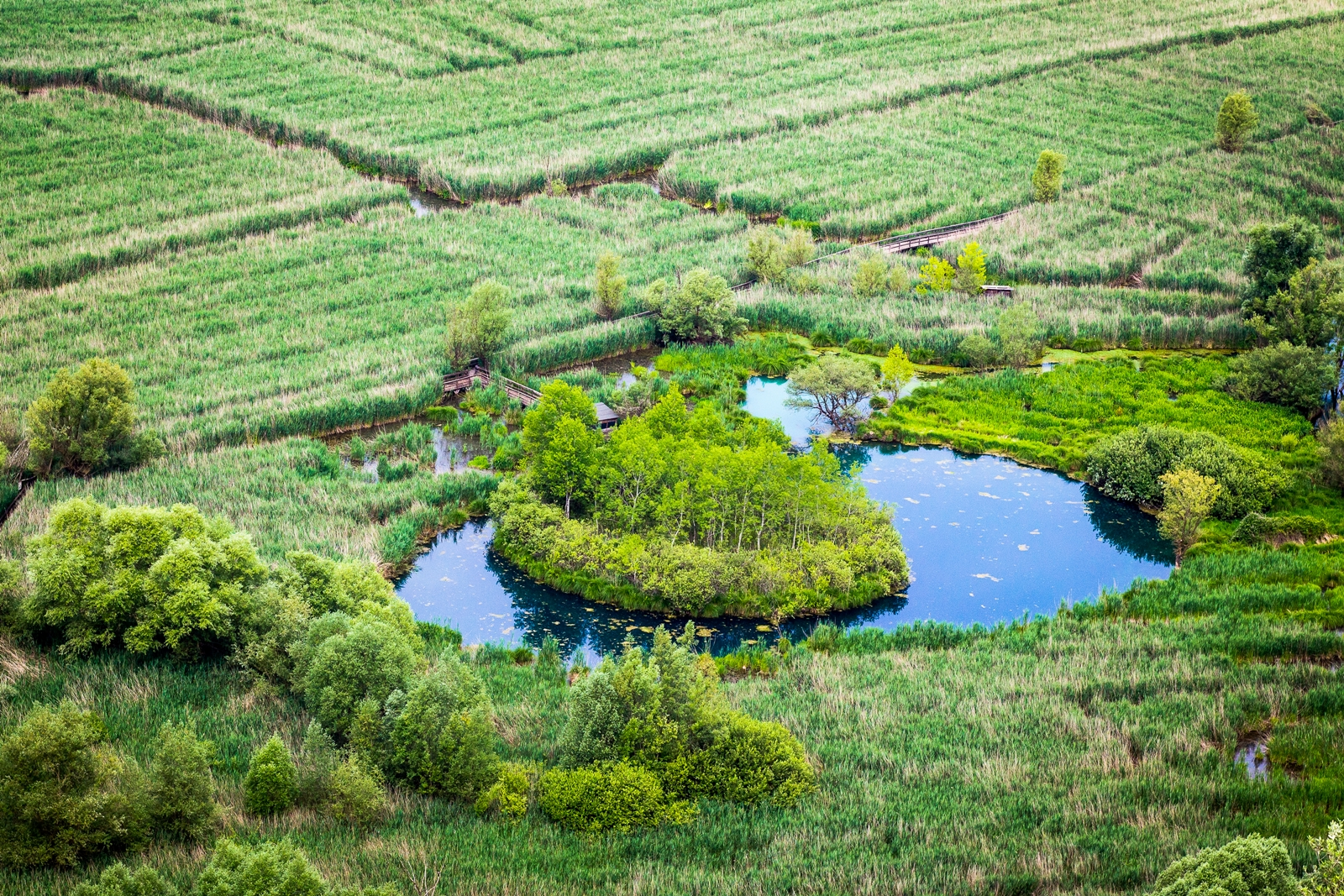
Floating island La Rota in Posta Fibreno lake, Italy

Natural floating islands are composed of vegetation growing on a buoyant mat of plant roots or other organic detritus. In aquatic regions of Northwestern Europe, several hundred hectares or a couple of thousand acres of floating meadows (German Schwingrasen, Dutch trilveen) have been preserved, which are partly used as agricultural land, partly as nature reserves.

They typically occur when growths of cattails, bulrush, sedge, and reeds extend outward from the shoreline of a wetland area. As the water gets deeper, the roots no longer reach the bottom, so they use the oxygen in their root mass for buoyancy, and the surrounding vegetation for support to retain their top-side-up orientation. The area beneath these floating mats is exceptionally rich in aquatic lifeforms. Eventually, storm events tear whole sections free from the shore, and the islands thus formed migrate around a lake with changing winds, eventually either reattaching to a new area of the shore or breaking up in heavy weather.

Some cenotes in northern Mexico have natural floating islands.

In the Brazilian Amazon, floating islands form in lakes on the floodplains of white-water rivers and are known as Matupá and range in size from a few square meters to a few hectares.

In Crow Wing County, Minnesota a floating bog over one point six hectares (4 acres) in size moved about the area resulting in docks and boat lifts being destroyed. As decaying mass decomposes it releases gases which keep the bog floating.

=== Pumice rafts ===
Another type of natural floating island is the pumice raft, which is created by an explosive volcanic eruption, and can float on the ocean for months or even years before becoming fully saturated and sinking. They may assist in the migration of plants and animals.

== Artificial floating islands ==
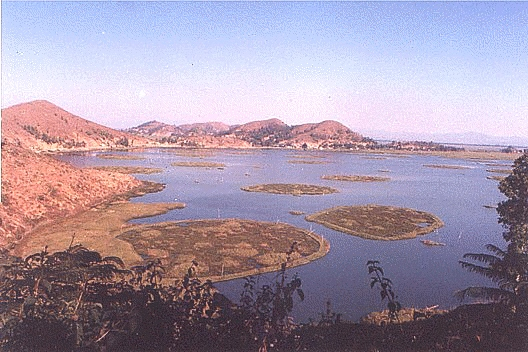
Circular phumdis, called athampum, were artificially built for fishing in Loktak Lake

Floating artificial islands are generally made of bundled reeds, and the best known examples are those of the Uros people of Lake Titicaca, Peru, who build their villages upon what are in effect huge rafts of bundled totora reeds. The Uros originally created their islands to prevent attacks by their more aggressive neighbours, the Incas and Collas.

The Aztec capital, Tenochtitlan (today Mexico City), was surrounded with chinampas, small artificial islands used for agriculture known as "floating gardens" (though not really floating). Such islands still exist in the city's borough and Lake Xochimilco, among other places. In China floating gardens on a large scale have been demonstrated with aquaponics systems growing rice, wheat and canna lily on islands.

Spiral Island was a more modern one-person effort to build an artificial floating island, on the Caribbean coast of Mexico. Modern artificial islands mimicking the floating reedbeds of the Uros are increasingly used by local governments and catchment managers to improve water quality at source, reducing pollutants in surface water bodies and providing biodiversity habitat. Examples include Gold Coast City Council in Australia. Artificial floating reedbeds are commonly anchored to the shoreline or bottom of water body, to ensure the system does not float away in a storm event or create a hazard.

During World War II, the British Project Habakkuk proposed the construction of aircraft carriers made of ice-like Pykrete. Its size and speed made it more of an artificial iceberg or island than a ship.

The demise of the two floating islands and the imprisonment of Vanalato developed after a conflict developed in the area.

Commercial development of floating islands has begun taking place. Floating habitat islands were installed with salicornia salt marsh plants at Sydney Olympic Park Authority in 2011 providing nesting sites for local and migratory birds including black swans, black-winged stilts, red-necked avocets, Pacific black ducks and chestnut teals, using the Aqua Biofilter product. The world's largest vegetated floating islands 1.6 hectares (4 acres) in size were installed in 2004 using Aqua Biofilter product with canna at Lake Tai, China using materials including a combination of polyurethane open cell filter foam, closed cell polyethylene flotation foam, bamboo and coconut fibre filter foam mix with wicking ability to supply water to plant roots.

A commercially produced floating island was installed in the river otter enclosure at Zoo Montana in 2007. In 2009 and the beginning of 2010, a few larger islands were launched to provide nesting habitat for Caspian tern colonies. The largest of the islands, at a record-setting 4,100 m^{2} (44,000 sq ft), was launched into the water at Sheepy Lake. These islands are a collaboration between the United States Army Corps of Engineers, Oregon State University, and Floating Islands West, a Floating Island International license holder.

A US Army Corps of Engineers project was built in 2012 in The Hideout, Pennsylvania, as part of a watershed management project. The floating island was created to mimic nature; help improve water quality, including reducing phosphorus levels; and buffer habitats against surges in nutrients and pollution.

Buoyancy in artificial floating reedbeds is commonly provided by polyethylene or polyurethane foam, or polyethylene plastic containing air voids. Growth media include coconut fibre; mats made of polyester or recycled PET bottles; synthetic geotechnical mat; jute; soil; and sand.

Artificial floating islands are sometimes made by planting cattails and other plants on floating plastic rafts in order to reduce phosphorus levels in the water. In Cleveland's Cuyahoga River floating rafts were made to restore fish populations.

Artificial floating islands have been sought out as structures for different habitational and industrial purposes, e.g. floating oil rigs.

== Locations ==
=== Africa ===
- Lake Victoria, Uganda
- Lake Kyoga, Uganda
- Lake Malawi, Africa
- Lake Upemba, Democratic Republic of the Congo
- Lake Chad, Chad, Niger, Nigeria and Cameroon
- Hartbeespoort Dam, North West, South Africa

=== Asia ===
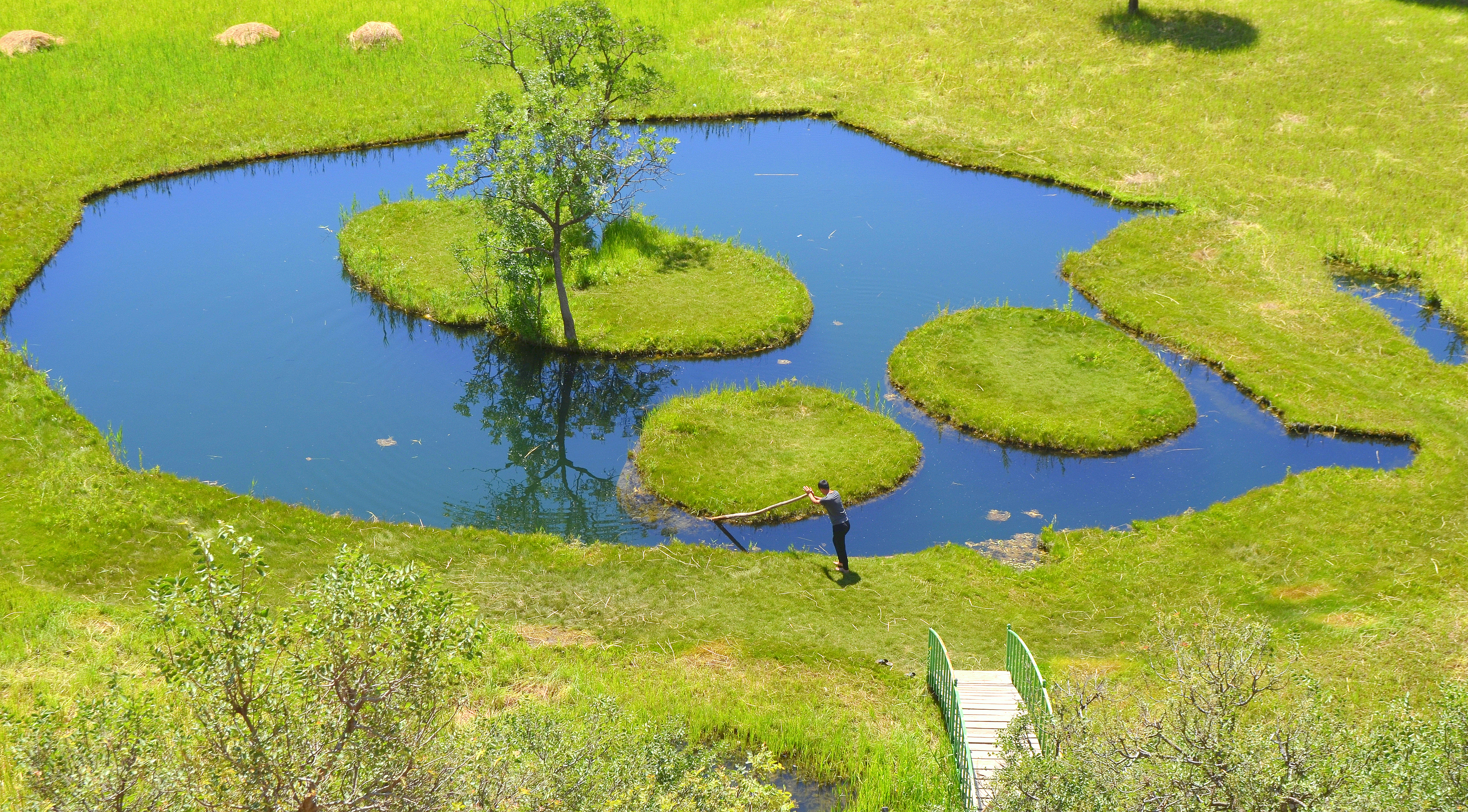
Floating islands (Bingöl) in Turkey

- Loktak Lake in Manipur state, India
- Prashar Lake at Mandi in Himachal Pradesh state, India
- Chamli gul, Takab, Iran
- Maldives Floating City, Maldives
- Inle Lake, Myanmar
- Çat Lake, Çelikhan, Adıyaman, Turkey
- Aksakal Lake, Solhan, Bingöl, Turkey
- Batabat Lake, Shahbuz, Azerbaijan

=== Australia ===
- Lagoon of Islands, Tasmania, Australia

=== Europe ===
- Danube Delta, Romania
- Lake Visitor, Montenegro
- Marais Audomarois, France
- Lago di Posta Fibreno, Italy
- Vlasina Lake, Serbia
- Semeteš Lake, Serbia
- Lake Kraljevac, Serbia
- Sommen, Sweden
- Das Schwimmende Land, Waakhausen, Germany
- Schwimmendes Moor, Jade, Germany
- Waterland, The Netherlands
- Lochan Saorach, Scotland

=== North America ===
==== Canada ====
- Williston Lake, British Columbia

==== United States ====
Listed alphabetically by state

- Unnamed Lake, Alaska
- Bolton Lakes, Bolton, Connecticut and Vernon, Connecticut
- Lake Yarbo, Winter Garden, Florida
- Lake Buckeye, Winter Haven, Florida
- Lake Idyl, Winter Haven, Florida
- Yoshi Island Lake Mary Jane, Orlando, Florida
- Umbagog Lake, New Hampshire and Maine
- Mill Pond, Alton, New Hampshire
- Island Pond, Springfield, Massachusetts
- Cranberry Island, Buckeye Lake, Ohio
- Lake Sadawga, Whitingham, Vermont
- Kettle Moraine, Wisconsin
- Prairie Lake, Barron County, Wisconsin
- Duwamish River, Seattle, Washington
- Shilshole Marina, Seattle, Washington

==== Elsewhere ====
- El Zacaton, Tamaulipas, Mexico
- Lake Ontario, Ontario, Canada and New York, United States

=== South America ===
- Lake Titicaca, Bolivia and Peru
- El Ojo, Argentina

== See also ==
- Artificial island
- Crannog
- Freedom Ship
- Great Raft
- Perelandra
- Pumice raft
- Seasteading
- Floating cities and islands in fiction
