= Vlasina (disambiguation) =

Vlasina may refer to:

- Vlasina, a region in southeastern Serbia
- Vlasina (river), a river in Serbia
- Vlasina Lake, a lake in Serbia
- WASP-60b, an exoplanet named Vlasina
