= Azerbaijani nomadic life =

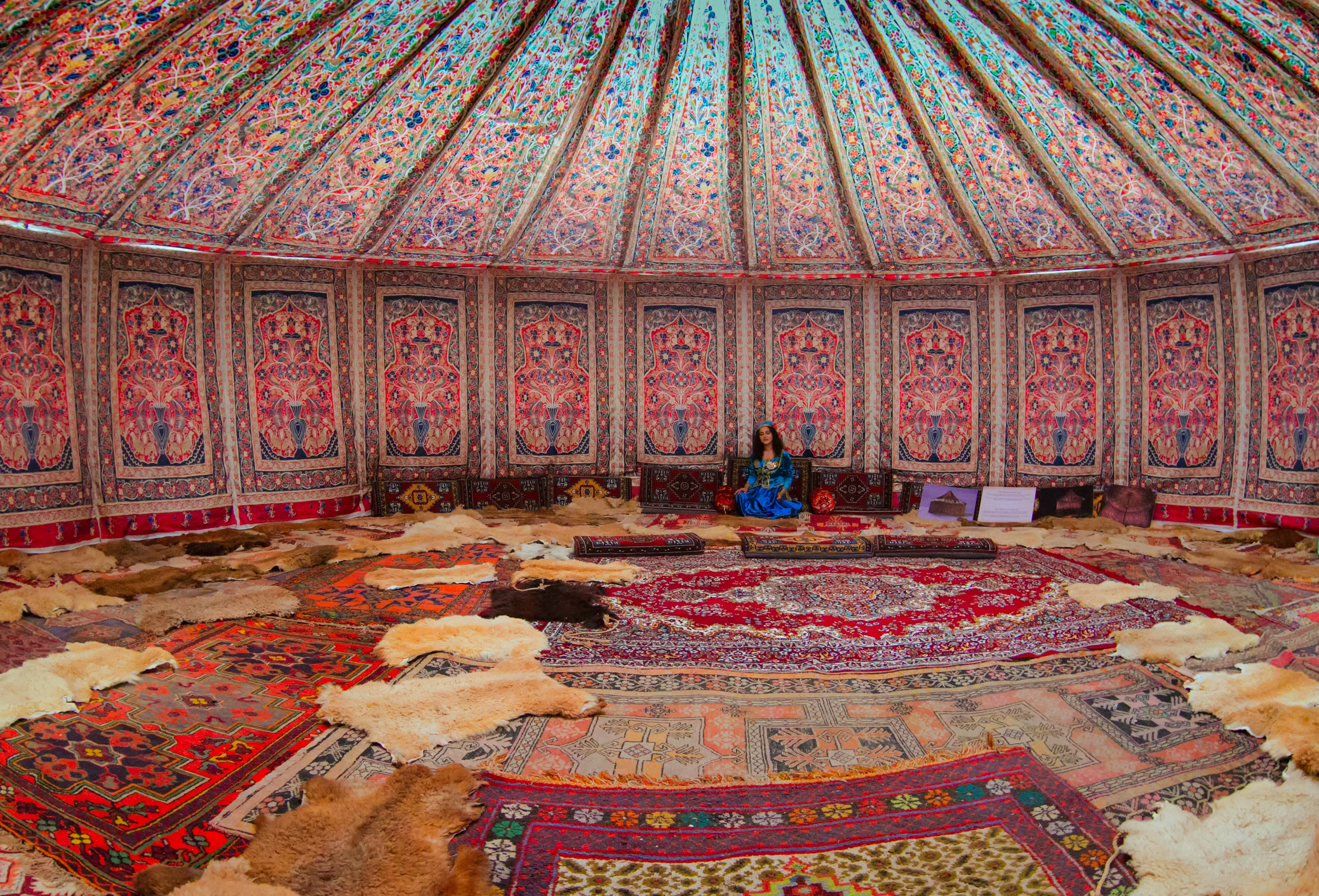
Traditional Azerbaijani yurt (tent)

Azerbaijani nomadic life- refers to the historical and contemporary practice of individuals or groups living a nomadic (tərəkəmə) or semi-nomadic (elat) lifestyle within the cultural environment of Azerbaijan, along with its historical, cultural, and customary aspects. Temporary dwellings used by nomads in Azerbaijan include various types such as "oba, shenlik, sığırxana, yataq, binə, yurd, düşərgə, qışlaq, dəkkə, dəngə, yaylaq, etc". During the summer season, nomadic homes such as "alaçıq, coma, dəyə, muxuru, qarakeçə, dünnüklü ev, kolux, mağardəyə, etc.," are used.

In 2023, the cultural environment of nomadic life and the migration route in Azerbaijan were recognized as part of the World Heritage.

== Terminology ==
- Elat: An Arabic-origin term used to describe nomadic peoples, many of whom are of Turkic descent, predominantly in Iran and Azerbaijan.
- Tərəkəmə: Used in the 19th to early 20th centuries to refer to nomadic lifestyle, specifically among the Turkic peoples of Azerbaijan. In modern times, this term is used for tribes (tərəkəmələr, qarapapaqlar).
- Tat: In its first meaning, used to refer to non-Turkic-speaking populations (Tats) in and outside Iranian Azerbaijan. In its second meaning, used to describe Turkic-speaking populations leading settled lives not affiliated with any tribe, observed only in Iranian Azerbaijan.

== Physical and human geography ==
=== Plains ===
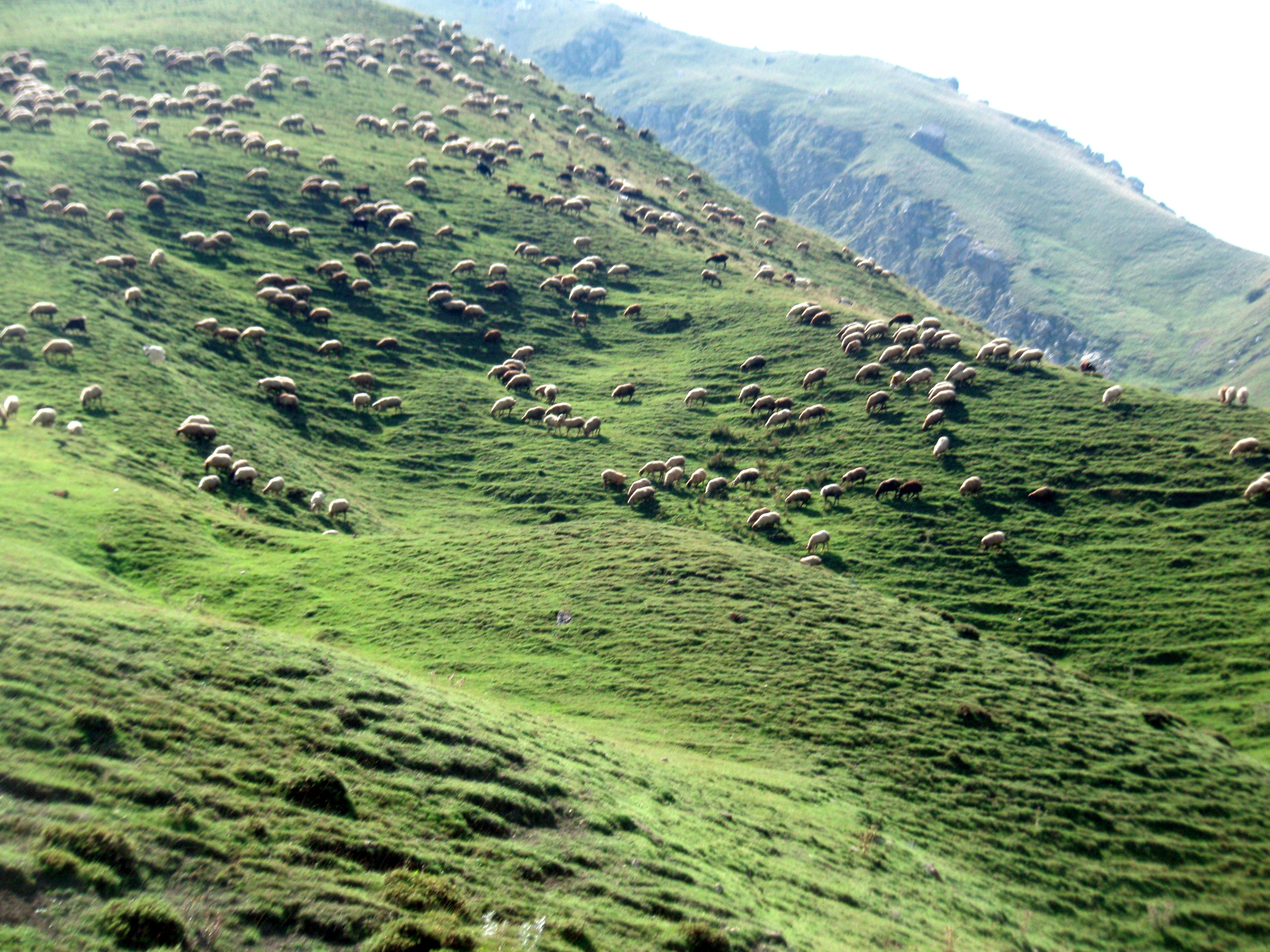
A herd of sheep on a meadow in Guba district

In Azerbaijan, as in other Turkic-speaking regions, highland pastures used for nomadic animal husbandry are called "yaylaq." Many of these yaylaqs are located at an altitude of up to 2800 meters above sea level. The ancient yaylaqs where sheep grazed were traditionally situated in the alpine and subalpine meadows of the Greater and Lesser Caucasus mountains. Yaylaq husbandry, known as a profession, emerged during the Early Bronze Age in the Transcaucasian region, particularly in modern Azerbaijan, and had formed by the early millennia BCE.

Yaylaq husbandry was primarily practiced by the population owning pasture lands in mountainous regions. Evidence of this can be seen in the form of cyclopean, sturdy stone structures built for seasonal habitation and defense against sudden attacks from neighboring tribes. Similar constructions to those inhabited by individuals engaged in animal husbandry during the Late Bronze Age can often be found in the yaylaqs of the Lesser Caucasus, such as Xaçbulaq, Kalbajar, Gadabay, Laçın, Batabat, as well as in the Ordubad mountains. Yaylaqs in Azerbaijan were extensively utilized until the 1980s.

Comparing archaeological data with the ethnography of Azerbaijan allows us to form an understanding of the nomadic migration pattern and the lifestyle in the yaylaq during ancient times. The population would gather their belongings onto carts and move along with their herds. Upon reaching the designated stop where the road turned into tracks, the property would be unloaded from the carts and loaded onto pack animals. According to historian Teymur Bunyadov, such movements to the yaylaq were already present during the Bronze Age.

The main reason for the settlement of Turks in Azerbaijan was the abundance of pastures, vineyards, and orchards, along with favorable conditions for animal husbandry. As a result, Azerbaijan and the region of Iraqi Azerbaijan became yaylaqs and qışlaqs for two million nomads.

=== Historical migration routes ===
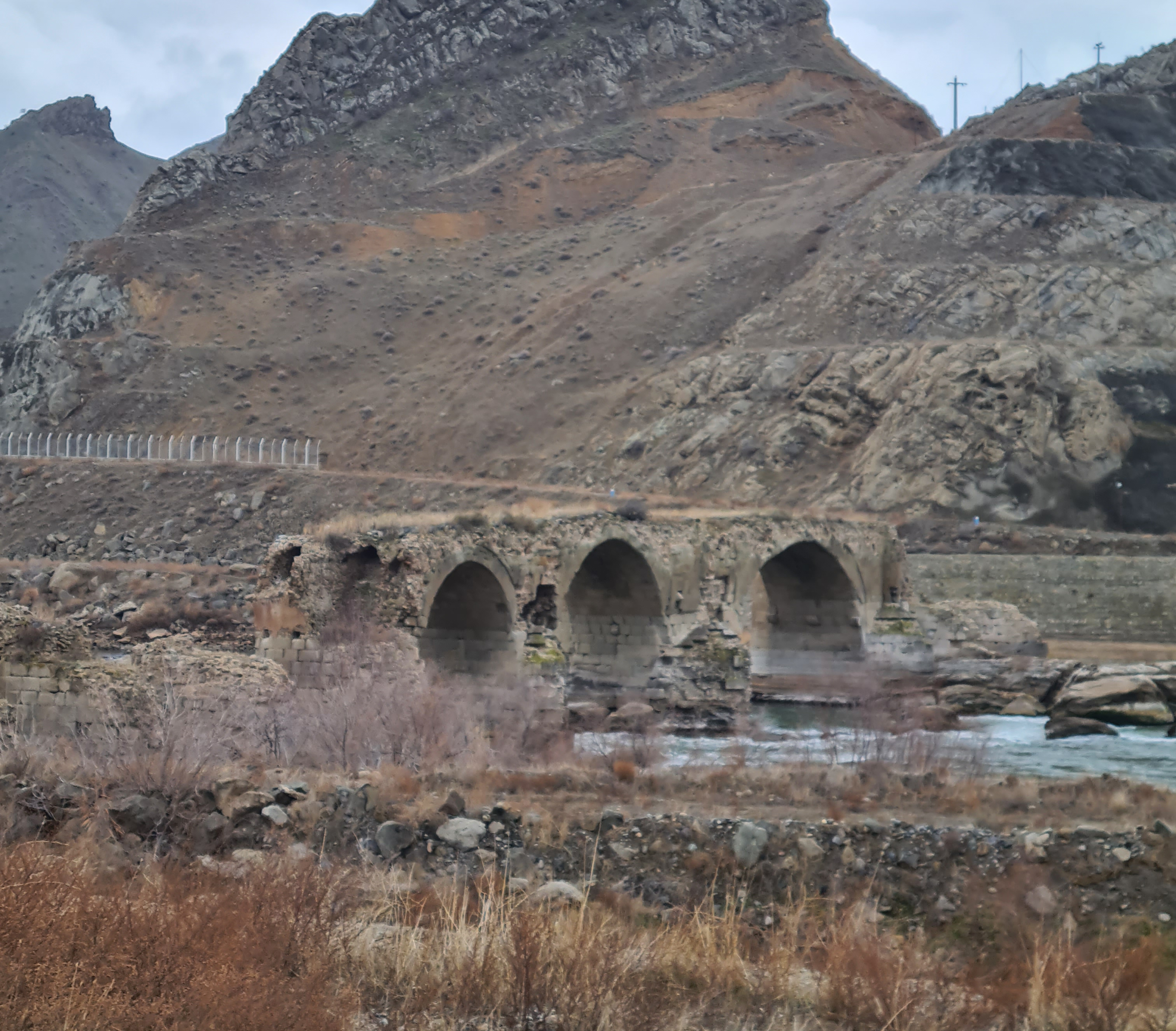
Khoda Afarin bridge with 11 arches. XIII century

The nomadic routes of the Western region of Azerbaijan began with crossings over the Kura River and continued along the flatlands, switching to mountain trails upon reaching the yaylaqs. Since the Western region's nomadic routes crossed the Kura River, livestock and sheep were ferried across the river using small boats, hence the presence of sailors on the river. The winter quarters of the Western region were located in Garayazi and Jeyranchol, while the summer pastures were in the Shahdag and Murguz ranges. By the late 19th century, the main roads used by the nomads of Gazakh and Elisabethpol districts were primarily Yasamal, Zeyem Valley, Kiran, Sari Yoxush, Qosha Deyirman roads, the road leading to Qizilbulaq yaylaq, and Zada roads. Villagers in the Western region who used the yaylaqs (Poylu, Salahli, Kesaman, and Qarabagli) independently moved via the Jeyranchol-Qedili pass, Annefeld, the German colony, to Morul village, and from there to the yaylaqs via the Yasamal road. In the Shusha district, there were two nomadic routes: along the Kura River, through the Asgeran Valley to Qirqqiz yaylaq, and the road from Khachin to Aylishli, Shusha village, and Kirs mountain. The inhabitants of Javanshir district also used the latter route.

The migration routes of the Shirvan nomads extended from the Küdru winter quarters to the Great Caucasus summer pastures. The directions of these nomadic routes are as follows: Hərmidağ—Paşalı—Udulu—Yavannı mountain—Mərəzə—Hilmilli—Dibrar, Girdə-Pirsaat valley—Təsi village—Sündüqozlu river—Dibrar, Kələqaya (Döymə road)—Ləngəbiz—Çarhan—Mərzəndigə—Kurdamir—Astraxanka—Sarıdaş yaylaq (Dibrar), Gödəkambarə winter quarters—Kolanı—Göylər—Ortabulaq valley—Shamakhi—Pirsaat valley—Çaylı village—Kurdamir—Astraxanka—Dibrar.

The summer pastures for the Mugan nomads were the Savalan, Qaradag, and Talysh mountains. The migration routes to the Savalan pastures included Bilasuvar—Bagrovdag—Agh evlər—Gəlin yurdu—Xatınbulaq—Qaraşiran direction. The Shahseven nomads, especially the Meşkin communities, utilized these routes when migrating to the pastures: Downstream of the Araz river—Xoruzlu mountain range—Bərzəng river, Ziyvə village (Mugan)—Sambur river—Ləngənd—Savalan, Upper reaches of the Qarasu river, Göytəpə-Səfidağ area—Talysh mountains—Çiçəkli mountain range.

== History ==
=== Modern era ===
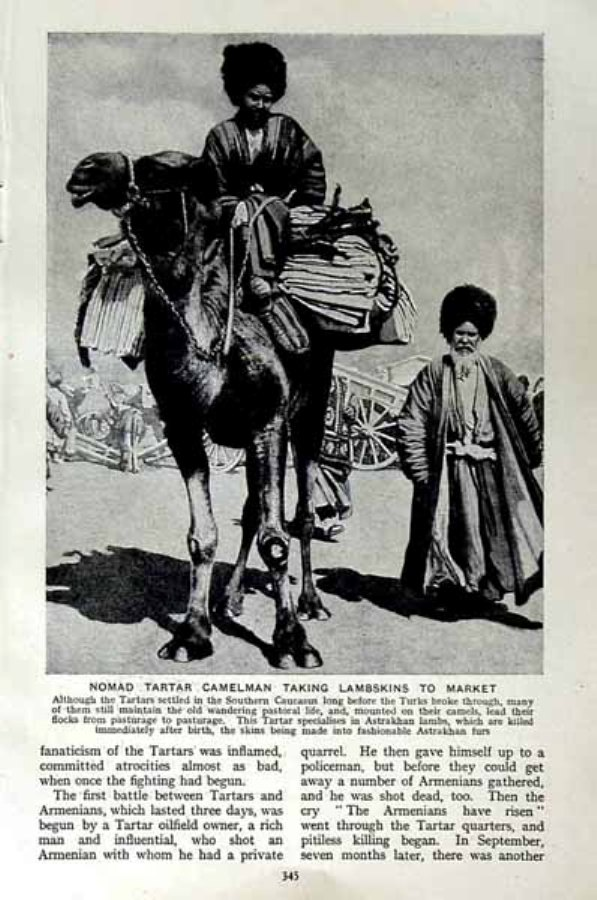
Azerbaijani nomad

In the 19th to early 20th centuries, the term "terekeme" was used to refer to nomads. A.D. Yeritsov noted that the term "terekeme" was not used to denote a specific ethnicity or tribe; rather, it was attributed to all Azerbaijani Turks. The terekeme (nomadic) tribes recorded in the Gazakh district and other districts included various groups such as Ayrımlı, Bayat, Qədirli, Qaraqoyunlu, Qaraxanlı, Kengerli, Salaxlı, Sofulu, and Tatlı. According to N.A. Abelova, the local population referred to nomadic tribes (such as those in the Goychay and Shamakhi districts) as terekeme or nomads.

Before the emergence of Azerbaijani national identity, inhabitants who led a semi-nomadic lifestyle and preserved patriarchal-tribal relations would identify themselves based on their tribe or ancestral affiliation (such as Avshars, Tekellers, Kengerlis, Ayrums, etc.). In Soviet Azerbaijan, there were four nomadic groups (Ayrımlar, Padarlar, Shahsevens, Qarapapaqs). Ayrımlar lived in the western part of Azerbaijan, while Shahsevens resided in the south of Azerbaijan along the Iranian border.

The fact that the summer pastures of the Saxurs were in Dagestan while their winter quarters were in Azerbaijan contributed to the Saxur-Azerbaijani bilingualism (Saxurs speaking their own language along with Azerbaijani). Russian-Swedish officer Ivan Gerber noted that the nomadic Arabs residing in Mugan during the winter months spoke in a "mixed Turkic-Arabic language."

=== Karabakh conflict ===
In the early 20th century, Zangezur served as a strategic corridor connecting Eastern Transcaucasia, Iravan Province, and Nakhchivan. In 1916, there were 120,000 Muslims and 101,000 Armenians living in the region (except for Azerbaijani shepherds from Karabakh's mountainous regions who migrated to the plains of Zangezur during the summer). A significant portion of Muslims resided in border areas. According to the administrative-territorial reform proposed by the Armenian side, except for the nomads, it was envisaged that 88,000 Armenians and 46,000 Muslims living in central Zangezur would be separated from the other peripheral areas of Zangezur.

Karabakh nomads were engaged in pastoralism, and their settlements depended on the high mountain pastures of Karabakh's mountainous regions. They traversed to these areas during the summer, crossing through the territories of the local population. The division of Karabakh's plains and mountainous regions between Azerbaijan and Armenia meant deprivation of the Azerbaijani nomads from summer pastures. The solutions proposed by Armenia—organizing irrigation works in Azerbaijani desert areas, migrating to new pastures in the north of Azerbaijan, or signing a special interstate agreement allowing nomads to use "Armenian" pastures in Karabakh—were not acceptable to Azerbaijan.

According to the report of Khosrov bey Sultanov on June 21, 1919, due to Armenian control of mountain passes in Karabakh, the 10,000 Muslim nomads with 150,000 head of livestock could not access summer pastures. Sultanov requested permission from the government to fulfill his duty towards tens of thousands of people. In 1922, according to the report of Gazanfar Musabekov, due to the Azerbaijan-Armenia war (1918–1920), nomads were unable to use summer pastures, leading to many deaths from malaria among both people and livestock.

== Residential settlements ==
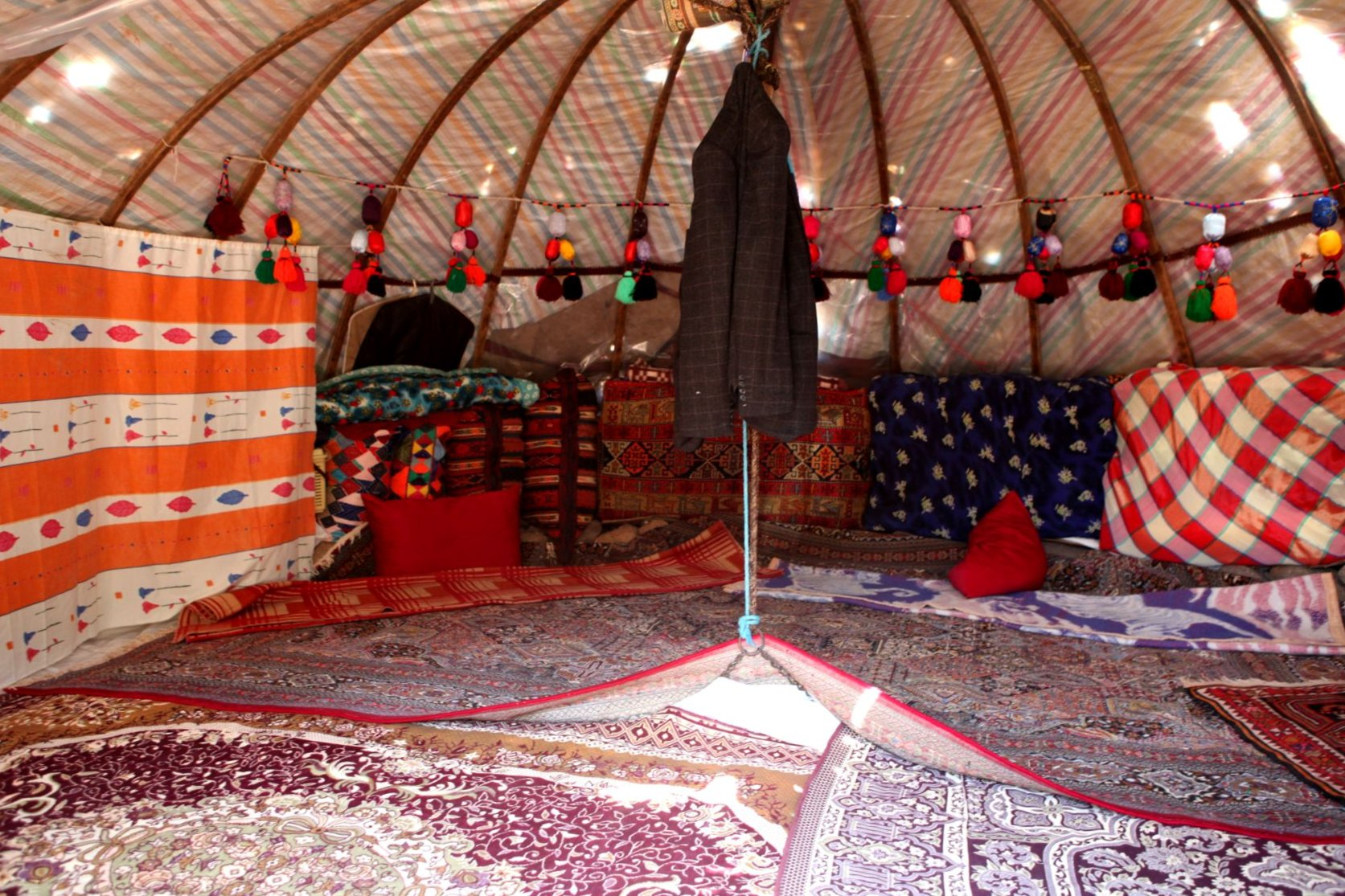
Shahsavan tent

The temporary residential settlements used by the nomads (semi-nomads) included "oba", "şenlik", "sığırxana", "yataq", "binə", "yurd", "düşərgə", "qışlaq", "dəkkə", "dəngə", "yaylaq", etc. During the establishment of the encampments, the dwellings of the tribal leader or elder (ağsaqqal) were placed in the center, surrounded by close relatives, while in the pastures, the makeshift shelters of the grazing shepherds and humble families were set up.

The "oba" was formed in connection with the migration of livestock farming to winter and summer pastures, divided into small units called "dəngələr" and separated from each other by pastures called "otarası". In the 19th century, although the "oba" was used by both livestock owners and settled residents, it gradually turned into a permanent residential settlement—a village.

In the second half of the 19th century, N. A. Abelov noted that the nomadic communities inhabited by different generations and groups (tribes, clans) were referred to as "şenlik" by Muslims. The "şenlik" was relatively smaller in size compared to the "oba" and often served as a temporary gathering place.

In the mountainous regions of Azerbaijan during the 19th century, the predominant type of settlement found in many villages was the "binə" structure (consisting of a bed, table, platform, hearth, and roof). As the "binə" expanded, residential houses were built, gradually turning it into a permanent living area. The "binə" was named after the first settler or the name of the livestock farming areas (such as Qasımbinəsi, Malbinəsi, Qoyunbinəsi, etc.).

Livestock nomads spent 8–9 months of the year in winter pastures and 3–4 months in summer pastures. Winter pastures differed from other residential settlements in terms of permanence and were considered the final stage of transition to village life. Examples of such settlements in Azerbaijan include Böyükqışlaq (Tovuz), Köhəqışlaq (Laçın), Qışlaq (Laçın), Köhəqışlaq (Qazax), Düzqışlaq (Qazax), Yayqışlaq (Daşkəsən), Günqışlaq (Zəngilan), Aydınqışlaq (Qəbələ), and Başqışlaq (Goranboy).

The selection of summer pastures where nomads stayed was based on proximity to water sources and kinship relations. Summer pastures where several generations of related families stayed for several years were named after the family head and the villages where the nomads originated (such as Əmirəhmədin yurdu, Nəbi yurdu, Eldar yaylağı, etc.).

=== Temporary Residential settlements ===
In Azerbaijan, the types of houses used during the summer pasture season include "alaçıq," "coma," "dəyə," "muxuru," "qarakeçə," "dünnüklü ev," "kolux," "mağardəyə," and others. Among these, "dəyə" (known as "qarakeçə" in Shirvan) and "alaçıq" have been more commonly used. There is a difference in size and solidity between the two. Depending on the size of the "dəyə," it requires 30-50 poles and 4-6 felts (called "qəlib"). The felts are prepared by skilled craftsmen known as "həllac."

== Employment ==
When choosing a bride among the herders, her weaving skills were especially taken into account. The weaving frame used in weaving was the most suitable type of frame for the nomadic household moving between winter and summer pastures. Except for the part called "qılınc" (sword), it was possible to replace the remaining parts of the weaving frame with branches and materials.

The Fars province group of the Baharlu, an ethnographic group of Azerbaijanis, lived a nomadic lifestyle until 1860, but due to the decrease in population resulting from massacres, it was decided that the tribal population was not suitable for long seasonal migrations. The Baharlu settled in winter quarters and began to make a living from agriculture and animal husbandry, as well as from handicrafts.

== Culture ==
Azerbaijan's material culture is the result of a blend of symbiosis, local elements, and the contributions of migrants that have continued over the centuries. Depictions of sheep and goats in Azerbaijani carpets are indicative of a certain tribe's nomadic past.

In Iranian Azerbaijan, there are minor differences between nomadic and settled communities in dialects, religious beliefs, customs such as oral literature, and rituals belonging to various periods of human life. Although a systematic comparison of the regional Azerbaijani Turkic dialects has not been published, there is evidence in some aspects, such as the melodic harmony, that nomadic individuals in Iranian Azerbaijan speak a "cleaner" Turkish compared to their settled Turkish-speaking (Tati) neighbors.

While the mutual assistance form called "ziyanlıq" has formed in village communities in Azerbaijan, it has also passed down to the nomadic population through interdependence. Ivar Lassi, who studied the privacy customs of Azerbaijani Turks, likened the tents used by the Turkestan nomads to the "pirlər" (small tents). He noted that the forms of the pirlər and the openings in their upper parts are evidence of the preservation of nomadic Turkic architecture.

Azerbaijani nomadic dance reflects pastoral dance elements. Related to totemism in nomadic choreography, movements and rituals specific to animals demonstrate the archaic nature of the dance. In modern times, classic European and Asian wrestling traditions influenced by local wrestling customs exist among Azerbaijan's local communities and nomads.

== Literature ==
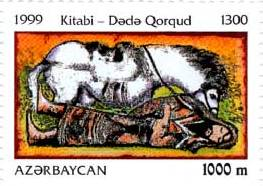
Azerbaijani postage stamp dedicated to "Kitabi-Dada Gorgud" saga

The art of Azerbaijani Ashiq combines poetry, storytelling, dance, and vocal-instrumental music, embodying the unity of poetical expression, storytelling, dance, and vocal-instrumental music. It is the continuation of the tradition of poets from ancient times, who later, under the influence of Uyghur-Mongolian and eventually Islamic culture, became known as Ashiqs, poet-musicians among the ancient Oghuz people. The arrival of Oghuz tribes to Iran and the South Caucasus territories after the Mongol invasion further strengthened these traditions. The prevalence of nomadic life among all Oghuz tribes in Iran, Iraq, and Eastern Anatolia significantly influenced the vitality and purity of these ancient traditions and narratives.

The epic "Kitabi-Dede Korkut" narrates the battles fought by Oghuz heroes in the Caucasus territories against the "infidels." Although its origins lie in Central Asia, it took shape in Azerbaijan, where the Oghuz people were densely settled. The final version of the epic was recorded in the modern Azerbaijani territory in the 15th century. The Dresden manuscript is in Azerbaijani, while the Vatican manuscript is in Anatolian Turkish.

The verses of the "Sayaçı" are a shining example of the literary creativity of Azerbaijani nomadic Turkic culture. During the winter and towards autumn, the Sayaçı would travel from village to village, soothing the souls of the nomads with their verses and collecting flour, cheese, wheat, barley, sheep, etc., in return. The verses of the Sayaçı are considered by the nomads as symbols of happiness and good fortune.

== Craftsmanship ==
The product made from pressed felt, called "qelib," had various types, such as "head qelib," "side qelib," and "door qelib." It required about 6 qelibs (head qelib) to cover the top of a felt tent. Additionally, a "door qelib" was applied to the tent's entrance. Generally, each felt tent required a total of 12-13 qelibs. Pressed felt without a frame, as well as felt made by tailors, was used by nomads, shepherds, and poor people.

The fur coat worn by nomadic herders was made from sheepskin with 4-5 layers of wool and remained unadorned. A felt coat, specifically for men, was a common seasonal garment. A "long-neck" coat (extending to the knees) was a distinctive feature among wealthy nomadic men.

To ensure comfort while riding horses and walking during migrations, nomadic women tied a "badisha" (a wrap without soles) with a "katma" (a tied cloth) inside their woolen socks within the felt boots. In rainy weather or during horse riding, Shirvan nomadic women adjusted the back of their wide cloak by pulling it forward between the layers, creating a makeshift cape to provide extra coverage. Wealthy nomadic women wore long-neck coats when embarking on a journey.

In the lives of nomadic herders, leather pouches were indispensable items.

=== Food ===
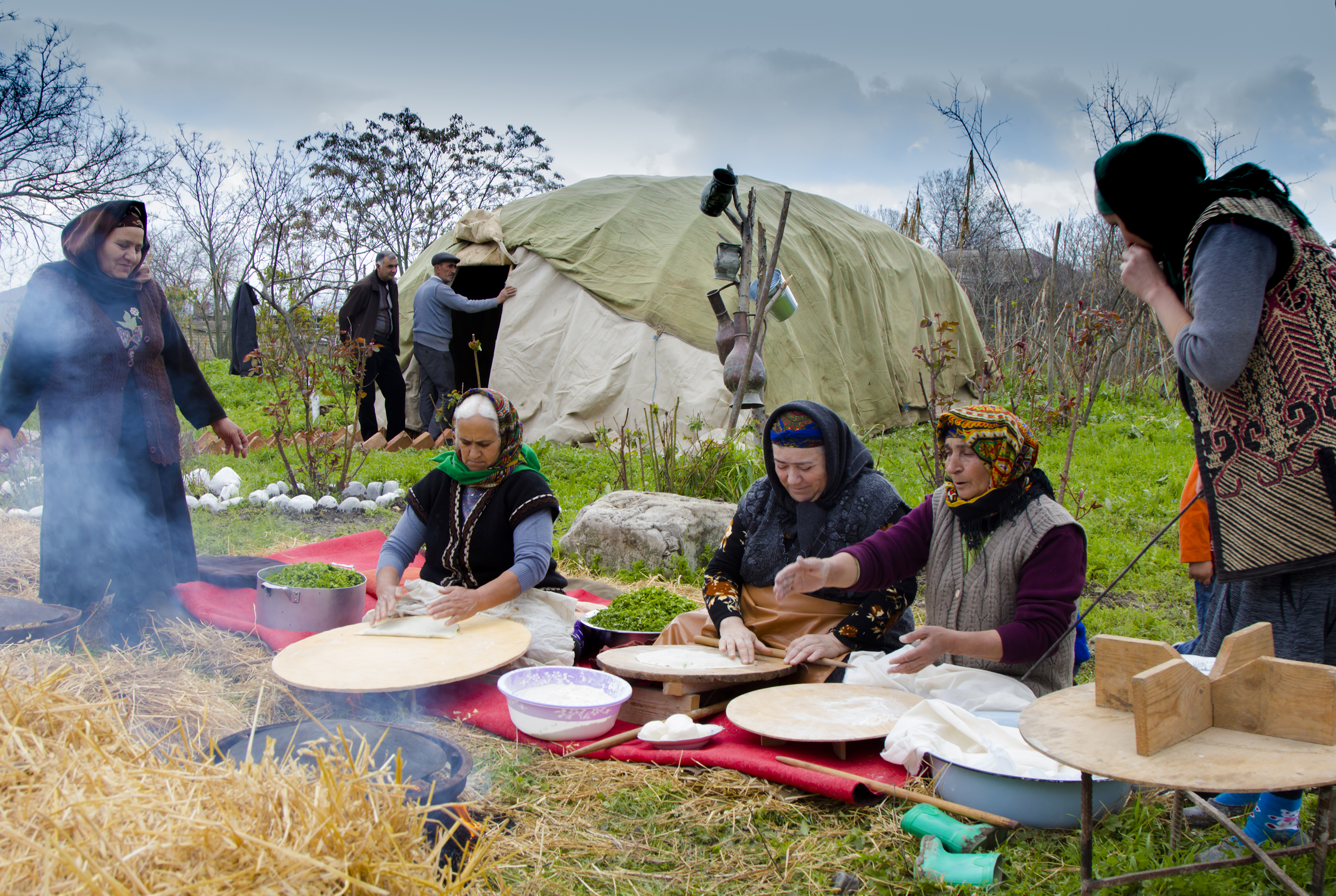
Tarakama festival. White

Mountain-dwelling nomadic herders had more meat and dairy-based meals in their diet compared to plant-based meals. Among them, preserving meat by frying was common. Dishes such as skewered kebabs, ground meat kebabs, grilled kebabs, stuffed kebabs, fried chicken, braised dishes, liver dishes, fried dishes, stews, stuffed vegetables, fried foods, soups, meat and vegetable stew, boiled meat, stone-cooked meat, and stew in a pot were widespread.

Griddle cakes were preferred among their bread options. A characteristic dish among nomads was a stew prepared from boiled meat and freshly milked dairy. Meals typically included dairy products (yogurt, cheese, cream, butter), and sometimes hot dishes.

== Folk calendar ==
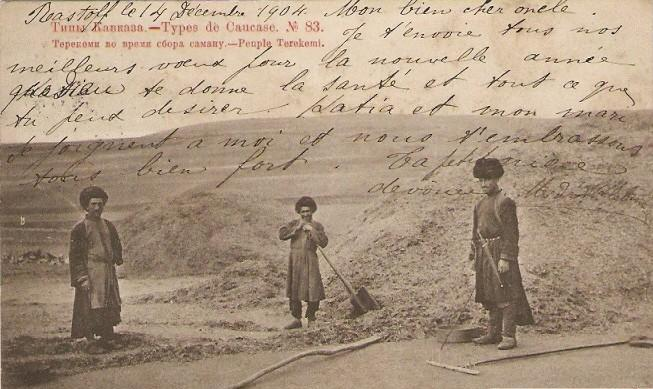
Tarekamas during the malt harvest. Postcard of the Russian Empire

The Qarayaz period posed challenges for the semi-nomadic herding population. Proverbs like "When Novruz arrives, it's summer, even if there are only 40 logs," or "After the holiday, 40 logs will burn" were not relevant during this time. The Qarayaz period was referred to by the herders as "restless," "unstable," or "erratic." The term "erratic" is associated with the inability of the livestock to rest due to insufficient grazing. The term "restless" implies the weakness of the livestock due to inadequate nutrition, preventing them from staying in one place.

Due to the scarcity of pasture during the Qarayaz period, nomadic herders had to preserve their reserves (food, flour, straw) and avoid venturing into the desert. There's a saying: "If Qarayaz becomes agitated, you need 40 bundles of firewood and 40 sacks of straw." According to the song "The exchange between Qarayaz and March," March was particularly harsh, and hunger was widespread. During such times, the herding community would express their concern upon seeing the southern slopes covered in snow.

During the Quyruqdoğdu period, herders would position their sheep behind a ridge or hill to shield them from the light of the stars. According to belief, the light of the stars causes animals to shed their wool. In the Azerbaijani folk calendar, the Quyruqdoğdu period is also referred to as "quyruqdondu." The explanation for this is that during this period, shepherds melt fat in the mountains and preserve it in the desert. If the fat freezes the next day, cold weather begins in the mountains, signaling the end of the warm season.

The Elqovan period is named after the practice of searching for those remaining in the highlands. The saying "When Elqovan comes, it's time to migrate" originates from this. When migrating from the highlands to the lowlands, a container consisting of butter churns is prepared after dismantling the yurt or tent. The container is thrown around the tent three times, first butter is thrown, then water is sprinkled over it.

The period when sheep are released into the flock by the herding community is called "Gochgarishan." Herders consider this time to fall in the last month of winter. Sheep are inspected, sheep fights are held, and prizes are awarded to the best sheep owners. Later, the sheep are released into the flock. If a white sheep joins the flock, it means that winter will be snowy and cold. If a red sheep comes, winter will not be too cold, and if a black sheep comes, it will be mild.

=== Iranian Azerbaijanis ===
In Iranian Azerbaijan, various ceremonies and festivals are celebrated with names like Mountain Migration, Shepherd's Festival, Sheep Day, Shepherds' Day, Grass Migration, and Lamb Day.

- Sheep Day: This ceremony was performed after the first birth in the sheep flock. Shepherds would dance and sing songs, and competitions would be held.
- Lamb Day: This festival took place ten days before migrating to the highlands. The young men would receive advice from the head shepherd or the leader of the community. The sheep would be adorned with various colored wool and bells would be hung around their necks.
- Grass Migration: This event was held to mark the completion of agricultural and village work. During this traditional temporary migration, the elderly, children, and livestock would be taken to the highlands.

=== Georgian Azerbaijanis ===
In the village of Armudlu in Dmanisi, Georgia, when Azerbaijani nomads return from the mountains to the plains, Elat Bayramı is celebrated on July 26. During this time, tents are set up, horse races are held, and bread is prepared. In the summer season, beekeepers also go up to the highlands because special flowers grow there, especially in cooler areas.

== Description in culture ==
- Abdulla Şaiq's work "Köç" depicts nomadic life, folk customs, neighbors in the highlands, entertainment, and games, as well as the love for the highlands. The sections of the work include "Our Migration to the Highlands," "Camp," "Kərim Baba and Ayrım's Daughter," "Pələng Ovu," and "Sümsü."
- The film "Çölçü," produced in 2012, explores the encounter between a boy living in the ancient world of the desert and a girl representing the modern world.

== UNESCO registration ==
The examples of intangible cultural heritage included in UNESCO's list in Azerbaijan under the theme of "Migration" or "Nomadic Culture" are: 1) Azerbaijani ashig art, 2) The heritage of Dede Korkut, including epic culture, legends, and music, 3) The game of Chovgan played with Karabakh horses, and 4) The cultural practice of preparing and sharing lavash.

In 2023, the cultural environment and migration route of the Khinalug people were registered as UNESCO World Heritage. This cultural environment includes the mountainous village of Khinalug in northern Azerbaijan, mountain pastures and rural areas in the Greater Caucasus mountains, as well as winter pastures in the central plains of Azerbaijan connected by a 200-kilometer migration route. The semi-nomadic lifestyle and culture of the Khinalug residents are characterized by seasonal migration between pastures and winter camps. This migration network includes temporary pastures and enclosures, as well as shrines and mosques.
