= Floating city =

Floating city may refer to:

== Settlements ==
- Aberdeen floating village, Hong Kong
- Floating cities and islands in fiction, the use of artificial floating cities as a speculative fiction trope
- Freedom Ship, a proposed floating city project (1990s)
- Maldives Floating City, a development designed to tackle rising sea levels
- Ocean colonization, the theory and practice of building structures to allow humans to live permanently in areas of Earth covered in water
- Seasteading, the concept of creating permanent dwellings at sea
- Very large floating structure, the theory and practice of building floating structures on the sea
- Vimana, a flying palace in Hinduism

== Entertainment ==
- "Floating City" (song), by Tori Amos' 1980s synthpop band
- Floating Cities, a 1991 book by Stephen Wiltshire
- Floating City, a 2012 film from Hong Kong

== See also ==
- Floating island
- Urban resilience § Flooding
- Stilt house
- Mobile offshore base (MOB)
- Walking city
- Fata morgana (mirage)
