= List of slums in Nigeria =

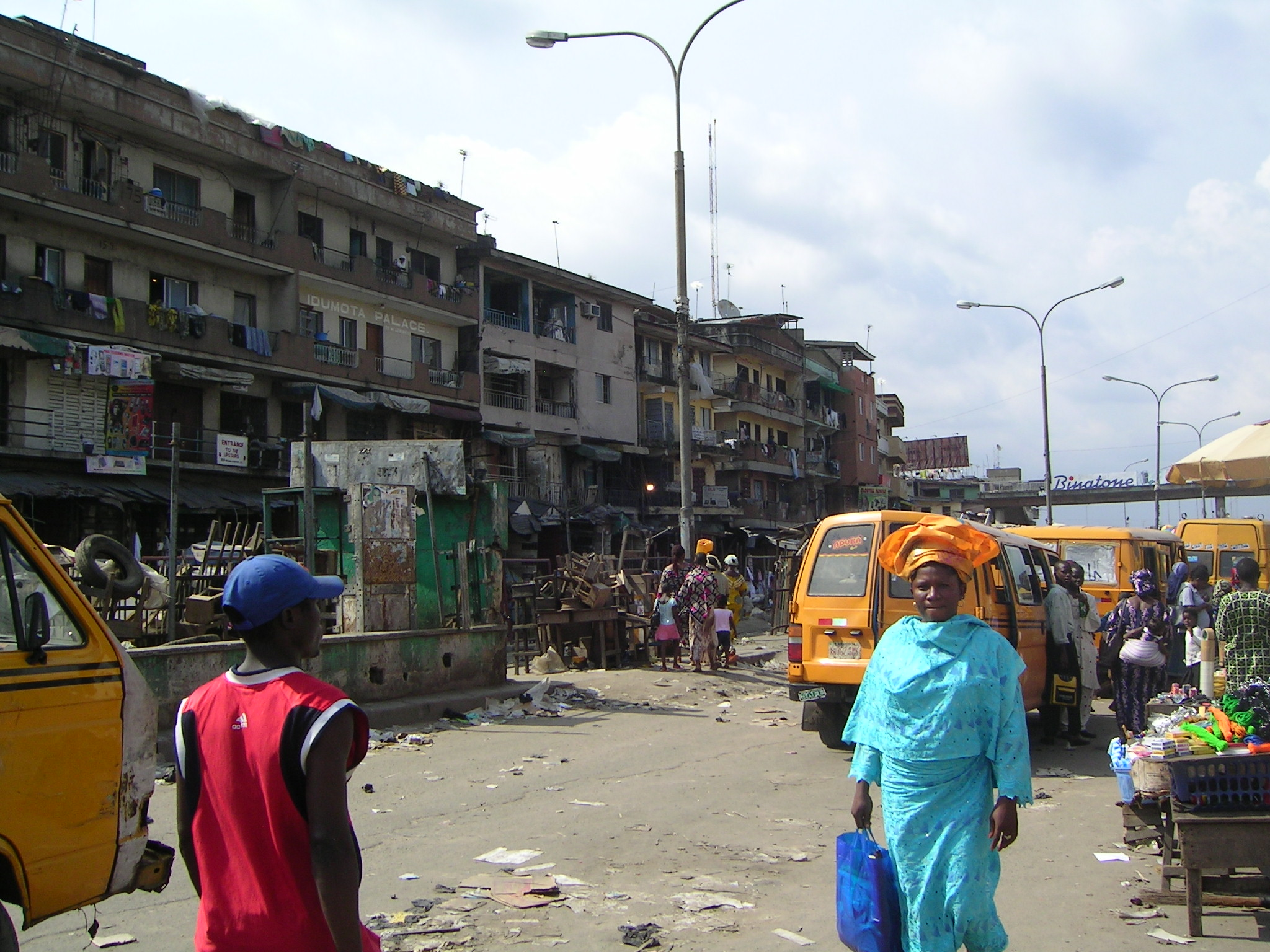
Broad Street in Lagos.

This is a list of slums in Nigeria.

The fishing community of Makoko in Lagos, known as the largest floating village in Africa, was home to up to 300,000 residents, until thousands were forcibly evicted starting in December 2025, as their houses on stilts were razed by the state government.

== Slums ==
- Ajah
- Agege
- Ajegunle
- Amukoko
- Badia
- Bariga
- Bodija
- Ijeshatedo/Itire
- Ilaje
- Iwaya
- Makoko
- Mushin
- Oke-Offa Babasale
- Somolu
- Ikorodu
- egbeda
- Ketu Ikosi (Boolar)
- Yaba

== See also ==
- List of slums
