= Lake Idyl =

- Location of Lake Idyl in Florida Location of Lake Idyl in the United States
- Location: Winter Haven, Florida
- Coordinates: 28.0420°N 81.7129°W
- Type: natural freshwater lake
- Basin countries: United States
- Max. length: 975 feet (297 m)
- Max. width: 905 feet (276 m)
- Surface area: 18.99 acres (8 ha)
- Surface elevation: 135 feet (41 m)
- Islands: a few floating islands

Lake Idyl, an oval-shaped lake, is a natural freshwater lake in northeast Winter Haven, Florida. This lake has a 18.99-acre (76,800 m^{2}) surface area. Much of its surface area is swamplike and it has at least a few floating islands. Lake Idyl is bordered on the north and west by residences, on the northeast by a citrus grove, on the southwest by woods, on the south by Colony Club Mobile Home Estates and on the southeast by woods.

This lake provides no public access, as it is completely surrounded by private land. A canal, not navigable, leads from the east side of Lake Idyl to nearby Lake Buckeye. Both the Hook and Bullet and the Take Me Fishing websites say Lake Idyl contains largemouth bass, bluegill and crappie.
