= Gramada (mountain) =

Mountain in Serbia

- Location within Serbia

Highest point
- Elevation: 1,721 m (5,646 ft)
- Coordinates: 42°47′33″N 22°22′20″E

Geography
- Location: Southern Serbia
- Parent range: Rhodope Mountains

Gramada or Crkvena planina (Serbian Cyrillic: Грамада or Црквена планина), is a mountain in southeastern Serbia, north of the Vlasina plateau and Vlasina Lake. Its highest peak, Vrtop, has an elevation of 1,721 meters above sea level.

== See also ==
- List of mountains in Serbia
