= Čemernik =

Mountain in Serbia

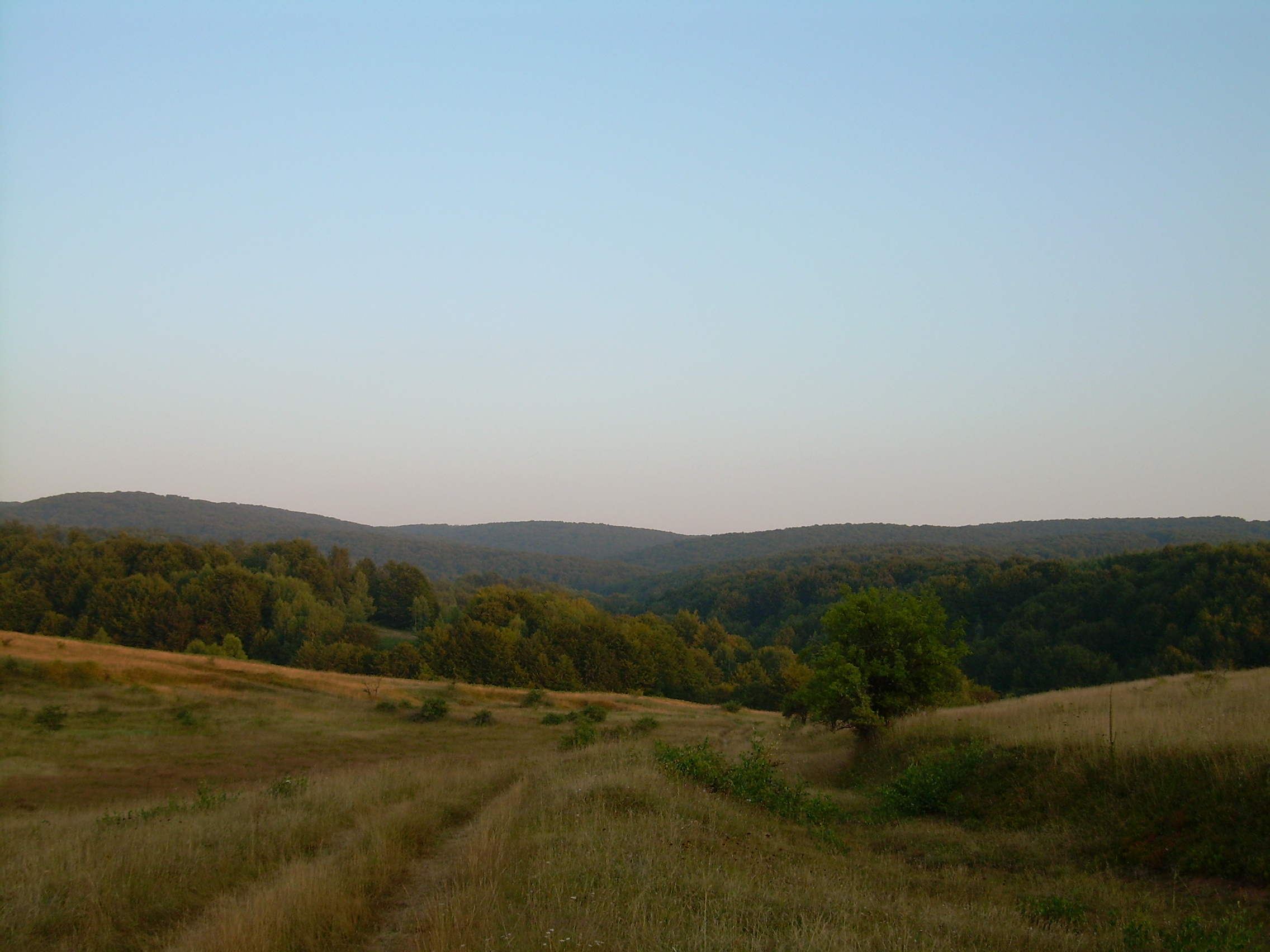

Highest point
- Elevation: 1,638 m (5,374 ft)
- Coordinates: 42°44′06″N 22°16′38″E

Geography
- Location within Serbia
- Location: Southern Serbia
- Parent range: Rhodope Mountains

Čemernik (Serbian Cyrillic: Чемерник) is a mountain in southern Serbia, near the town of Surdulica. Its highest peak Vrlo osoje has an elevation of 1,638 m (5,374 ft) above sea level. It is one of mountains that surround the Vlasina plateau and the Vlasina Lake.

== See also ==
- List of mountains in Serbia
