= Lagoon of Islands =

Wetland in Central Highlands, Tasmania

Lagoon of Islands is a wetland in the Central Highlands of Tasmania. In 1964 its headwater rivers including Shannon River (Tasmania) and its tributary Ouse River (Tasmania) were dammed to supply water for agriculture in the upper Derwent valley. Restoration works commenced in 2013.
