= Gochgarishan =

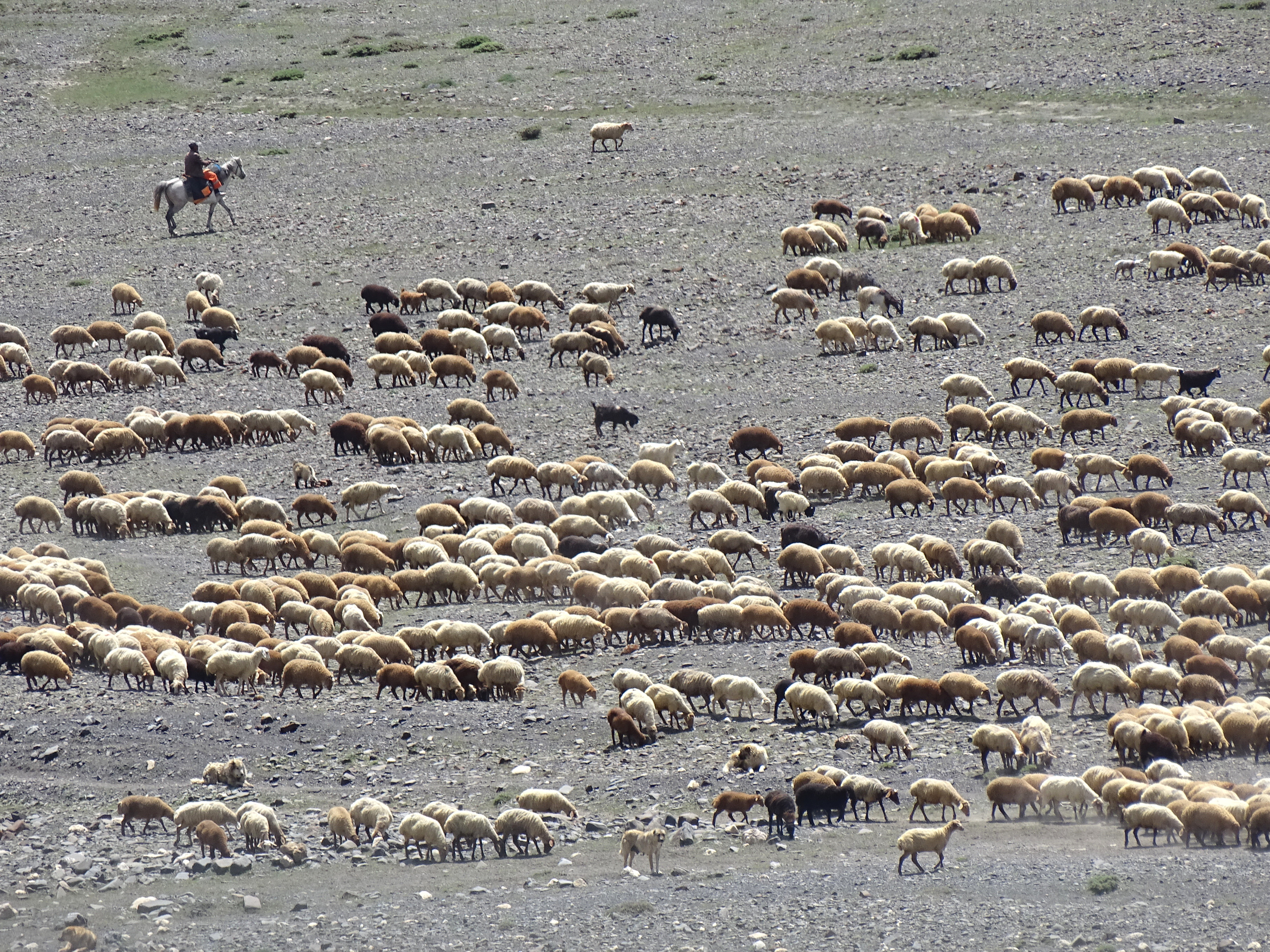

Gochgarishan or Goch borani refers to the beginning of autumn according to the Azerbaijani folk calendar.

== Duration ==
In Azerbaijan, pastoralists refer to the beginning of autumn as "gochgarishan". During this month, sheep that have been previously bred are released into the herd, taking into account that breeding coincides with the last month of winter (boz ay). Sheep are released into the herd within the first 5–10 days of autumn. This period experiences cooler weather, heavy rainfall, and strong winds. The snow that falls on the mountains during this time is referred to as "boranlı qar" (snowstorm snow). Hence, "gochgarishan" is also called "goch borani" due to these weather conditions.

Historically, the month of "gochgarishan" has been marked with significance. This is the time when the herds are assessed, and sick, old, or unproductive sheep are removed from the herd. Shepherds determine the date when the sheep will be released into the herd. According to tradition, this day should fall on a Friday.

A ceremony is held to inspect the sheep that will be released into the herd. Young rams, with marked foreheads, engage in mock battles. The best rams' owners are presented with gifts. The chosen rams are brought to the shepherds. Shepherds welcome guests and offer flatbread as a meal. Those who dance well perform the "yalli" dance. Afterwards, the sheep are released into the herd.

Shepherds oversee the mating of the sheep. It is believed that if a white ewe approaches the ram as it is being released into the herd, it foretells a cold and snowy winter. If a red ewe approaches, it suggests a mild winter, and a black ewe predicts a calm winter. The sheep remain in the herd until the last month of autumn.

In the traditions of Azerbaijani people in Ighdır, the "Goch gatımı" ceremony has become a customary practice. Towards the end of autumn, several well-bred sheep are released into the herd. These sheep are adorned beforehand, painted with natural dyes obtained from local plants or with henna, and decorated with sugar, beads, and apples. To ensure both female and male offspring, a representation of a girl and a boy is placed on the back of the ram. It is believed that hanging apples or pomegranates on the ram's horns will result in the birth of twin lambs. Additionally, herd owners treat the community with halva and dried apricots as part of the festivities.

== İntersecting periods ==
The Autumn Equinox (pakta) symbolizes equal day and night. In Azerbaijani folk belief, the Moon and the Sun are portrayed as lovers. Their love is eternal, yet they can never unite. However, on the day when night and day are equal, they can see each other's faces. Despite this, they still lose sight of each other without being able to meet. In Azerbaijani villages, various games and celebrations take place on this night.
