= Lake Buckeye =

- Location of Lake Buckeye in Florida Location of Lake Buckeye in the USA
- Location: Winter Haven, Florida, U.S.
- Coordinates: 28.0405°N 81.7061°W
- Lake type: natural freshwater lake
- Basin countries: United States
- Max. length: 3,070 feet (940 m)
- Max. width: 1,285 feet (392 m)
- Surface area: 70.24 acres (28 ha)
- Surface elevation: 128 feet (39 m)
- Islands: At least a few small floating islands

Lake Buckeye, a natural freshwater lake in eastern Winter Haven, Florida, United States, is somewhat oval in shape. This lake has a 70.24-acre (284,300 m^{2}) surface area. This lake is bordered on the west side by residences and along most of the north and east by woods. Buckeye Road borders the lake on the south and part of the southeast. This lake is very swamplike along its northern, eastern and southeastern shores. It has a number of floating islands along these areas and at least one on its west shore.

The public has access to this lake along most of its southeast shore and all of its south shore, along the right-of-way of Buckeye Road. A public boat ramp is on the southeast shore, again along Buckeye Road. This lake has no public swimming areas. The Hook and Bullet website says Lake Buckeye contains largemouth bass, bluegill and crappie.
