= Maldives Floating City =

Planned development in the Indian Ocean

Maldives Floating City is a development in Maldives designed to tackle the rising sea levels of the Indian Ocean.

== Description ==
Set to open in 2027, the city will house approximately 20,000 residents in eco-friendly floating homes and structures that rise with the ocean. It is located about 10 minutes by boat from the capital city, Malé.

The Maldives Floating City is inspired by traditional Maldivian sea-faring culture, featuring hexagonal islands modeled on local brain coral, creating a brain-like pattern when viewed from above. The city is also host to hotels, restaurants, shops, a hospital, a school and a government building.

The project is developed in partnership between the government of Maldives and Dutch Docklands, a property developer.
