= Batabat =

Lake in Azerbaijan

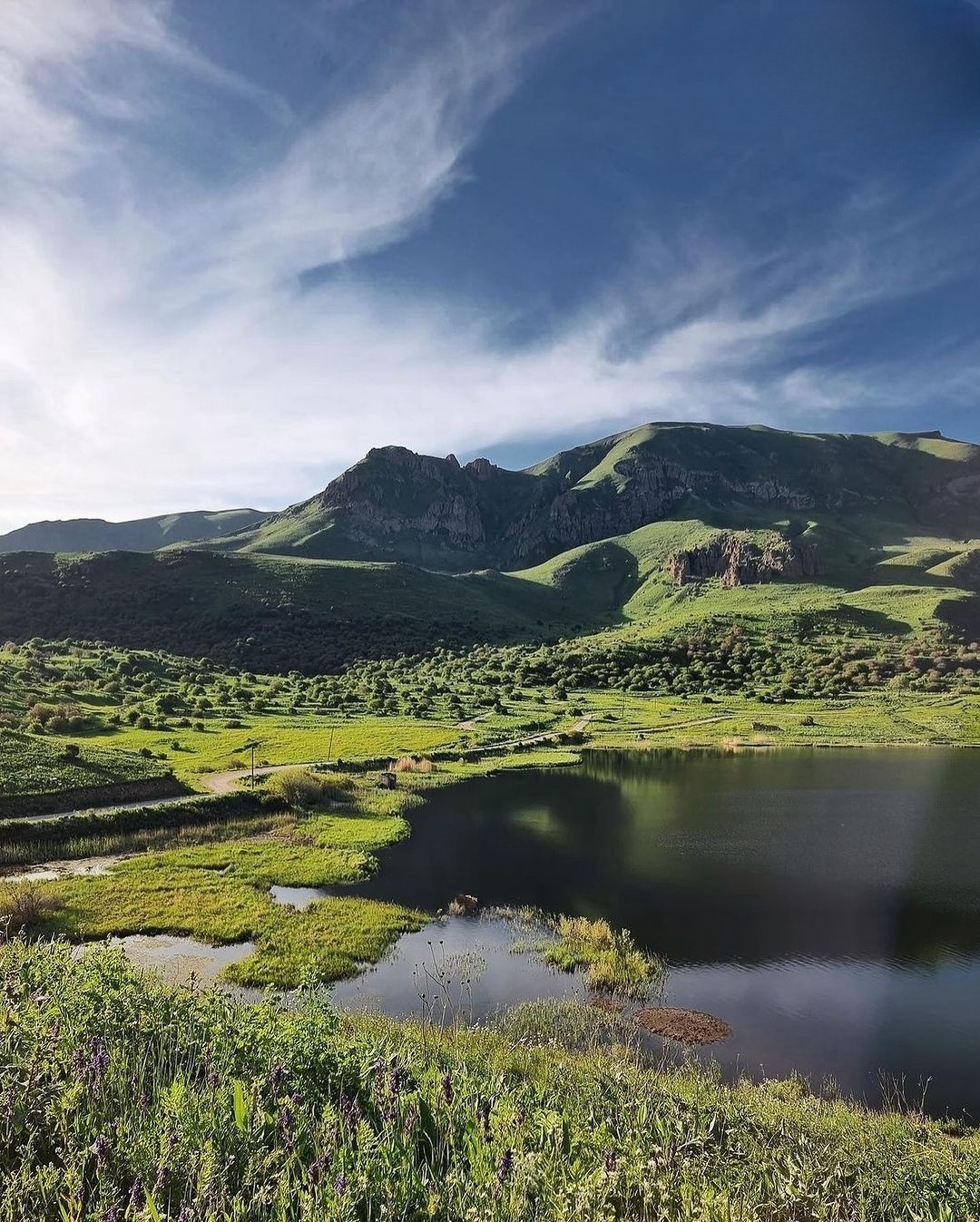
- Batabat Lake in 2024

- Location within Azerbaijan
- Interactive map of Batabat
- Location: South Caucasus, Azerbaijan
- Coordinates: 39.539°N 45.784°E
- Type: tarn
- Max. length: 0.6 km (0.37 mi)
- Max. width: 0.6 km (0.37 mi)
- Surface area: 0.16 km^{2} (0.062 sq mi)
- Surface elevation: 2,500 m (8,200 ft)

Batabat (Azerbaijani: Batabat) is a tarn in the South Caucasus.

It is located in Azerbaijan, in the mountains of Shahbuz District, Nakhichivan Autonomous Republic. Located at an elevation of 2,500 meters above sea level. There is a lake with a 16 ha area is remarkable with a peaty island floating on the surface of the water. There are also natural springs that mineralized with carbonate, hydrocarbonate, and potassium-sodium-magnesium around the lake, which treats Gastrointestinal diseases.

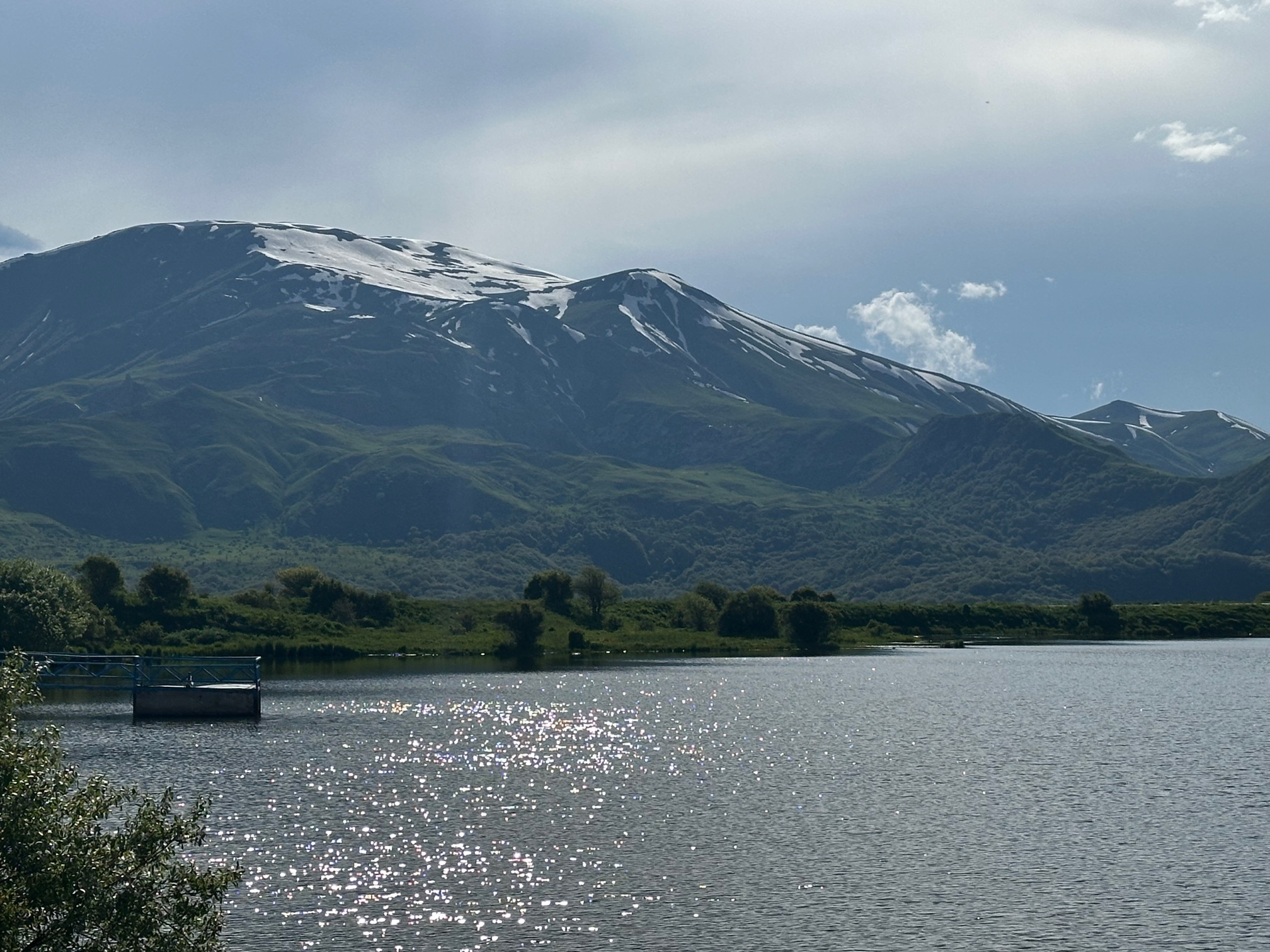
Lake of Batabat (Nakhchivan).
