= Vlasina =

Geographical micro-region in Serbia

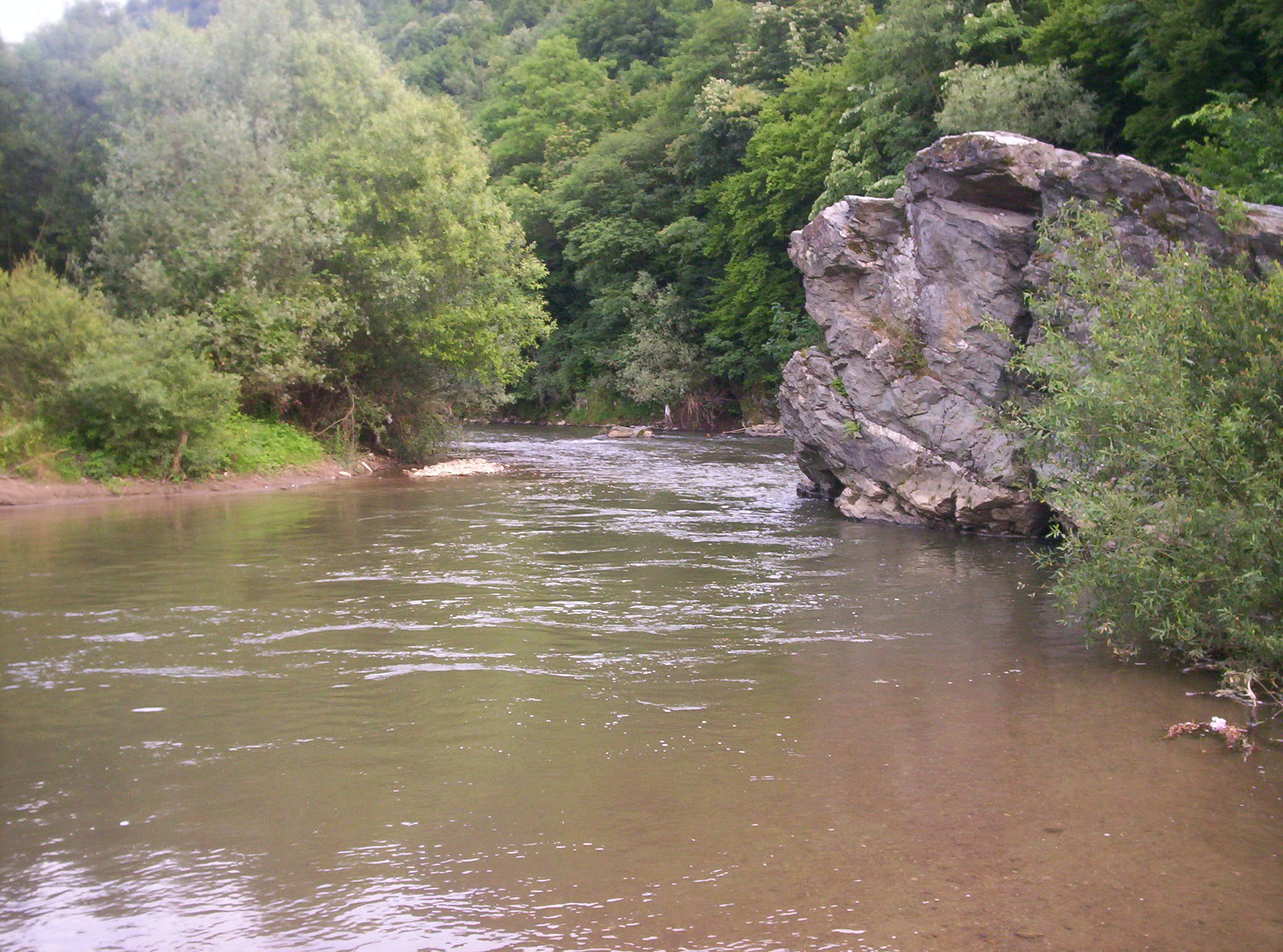
- Vlasina River

Location
- Country: Serbia

Ramsar Wetland
- Designated: 13 October 2007
- Reference no.: 1738

Vlasina is a mountainous region in the southern Serbia. It corresponds to the territories of municipalities of Crna Trava, Vlasotince and Surdulica. It is a border area to Bulgaria, a region of the Rhodopian Serbia, with old rocks and mountains.

== Geography ==
The most prominent landforms of the region are eponymous Vlasina River and Vlasina Lake. Near Vlasotince, the remains of ancient volcanic eruptions are particularly visible.

In 2018 it was announced that European free-tailed bat, previously unrecorded in Serbia, was discovered living in Vlasina region. It is a 31st species of bat which inhabits the country and the one with the largest wingspan.

== See also ==
- List of regions of Serbia

== Sources ==
- Jovan Đ. Marković (1990): Enciklopedijski geografski leksikon Jugoslavije; Svjetlost-Sarajevo; ISBN 86-01-02651-6
- Veliborka Staletovic, Environmentalists Against Exploitation of Potable Water, 23 February 2005, published at
- Valentina Zlatković (2007-06-22) Biser juga pod zaštitom države. Politika (in Serbian)
