= Bogdan Stamenković =

Serbian footballer

Personal information
- Full name: Bogdan Stamenković
- Date of birth: 19 January 1998 (age 28)
- Place of birth: Surdulica, FR Yugoslavia
- Height: 1.82 m (6 ft 0 in)
- Position: Forward

Team information
- Current team: Kannur Warriors FC
- Number: 39

Youth career
- 2004–2009: Čelik Belo Polje
- 2009–2012: Radnik Surdulica
- 2012–2017: Spartak Subotica

Senior career*
Years	Team	Apps	(Gls)
2017–2018	Spartak Subotica	2	(0)
2017	→ Bačka 1901 (loan)	9	(2)
2017–2018	→ Bratstvo Prigrevica (loan)	15	(5)
2018–2019	Bratstvo Prigrevica	12	(5)
2019–2021	Radnik Surdulica	64	(7)
2022	Kavala	25	(8)
2022	Volos		
2023	Diagoras	18	(6)
2023–2024	Egaleo	29	(4)
2024–2025	Radnik Surdulica	10	(2)
2025	Mykonos		
2026	Bokelj	15	(1)
- * Club domestic league appearances and goals as of September 2026

Bogdan Stamenković (Serbian Cyrillic: Богдан Стаменковић; born 19 January 1998) is a Serbian professional footballer who plays as a forward.

== Career ==
=== Spartak Subotica ===
==== 2016–17 season ====
Born in Surdulica, Stamenković started playing football with football club Čelik from Belo Polje. After five years at Čelik, Stamenković joined Radnik Surdulica, where he stayed until 2012. After he graduated from elementary school, Stamenković moved to Spartak Subotica. He signed his first scholarship contract with the club in early 2017, after which he moved to the Serbian League Vojvodina side Bačka 1901 on dual registration, scoring two goals on 9 matches until the end of the 2016–17 campaign. Stamenković made his official debut for the first team of Spartak Subotica in 3–0 away defeat against his former club Radnik Surdulica. He joined the game replacing Milivoj Krmar in 72 minute of the Serbian SuperLiga match played on 22 April 2017, under coach Andrey Chernyshov. He also noted an appearance in a match against Borac Čačak. During the season, Stamenković played with reserves respective.

==== 2017–18 season ====
Returning to the squad in summer 2017 and after he overgrown youth selection, Stamenković joined the first team as a fully senior and regular member in summer 2017. As he started the 2017–18 Serbian SuperLiga as a back-up choice, without official appearances under coach Aleksandar Veselinović, he moved on loan to Bratstvo Prigrevica. Playing the whole 15 caps for the first half-season as a bonus player in the Serbian League Vojvodina, Stamenković scored 5 goals and made 3 assists, having also marked with 7.03 average rating. At the beginning of December, a loan deal was terminated and he returned to Spartak. In February 2018, passing the winter-break with Spartak, Stamenković extended a loan deal to Bratstvo Prigrevica until the end of season.

== Playing style ==
Stamenković is a right-footed striker, who is capable of playing as a centre forward, attacking midfielder, or left winger. At the age of 19, Stamenković was described as a mobile footballer with good ball control and technique. At 1.82 m high, he is also described as dominant in the air and a good header.

== Career statistics ==
As of 24 June 2022

Appearances and goals by club, season and competition
Club	Season	League			Cup		Continental		Other		Total	
Club	Season	Division	Apps	Goals	Apps	Goals	Apps	Goals	Apps	Goals	Apps	Goals
Bačka 1901 (loan)	2016–17	Serbian League Vojvodina	9	2	—		—		—		9	2
Bratstvo Prigrevica (loan)	2017–18	Serbian League Vojvodina	15	5	—		—		—		15	5
Spartak Subotica	2016–17	Serbian SuperLiga	2	0	—		—		—		2	0
Spartak Subotica	2017–18	Serbian SuperLiga	0	0	—		—		—		0	0
Spartak Subotica	Total		2	0	—		—		—		2	0
Bratstvo Prigrevica	2018–19	Serbian League Vojvodina	12	5	—		—		—		12	5
Radnik Surdulica	2018–19	Serbian SuperLiga	12	2	1	0	—		—		13	2
Radnik Surdulica	2019–20	Serbian SuperLiga	12	2	2	1	—		—		14	3
Radnik Surdulica	2020–21	Serbian SuperLiga	22	1	3	0	—		—		25	1
Radnik Surdulica	2021–22	Serbian SuperLiga	10	1	2	0	—		—		12	1
Radnik Surdulica	Total		56	6	8	1	—		—		64	7
Kavala	2021–22	Super League Greece 2	25	8	0	0	—		—		25	8
Volos	2022–23	Super League Greece	0	0	0	0	—		—		0	0
Career total			119	26	8	1	—		—		127	27
