= Ćurkovica =

Ćurkovica may refer to:

- Ćurkovica (Surdulica), a village in the Surdulica municipality of Pčinja District
- Ćurkovica (Vranje), a village in the Vranje municipality of Pčinja District
