= Dugojnica =

Dugojnica Дугојница
- Village
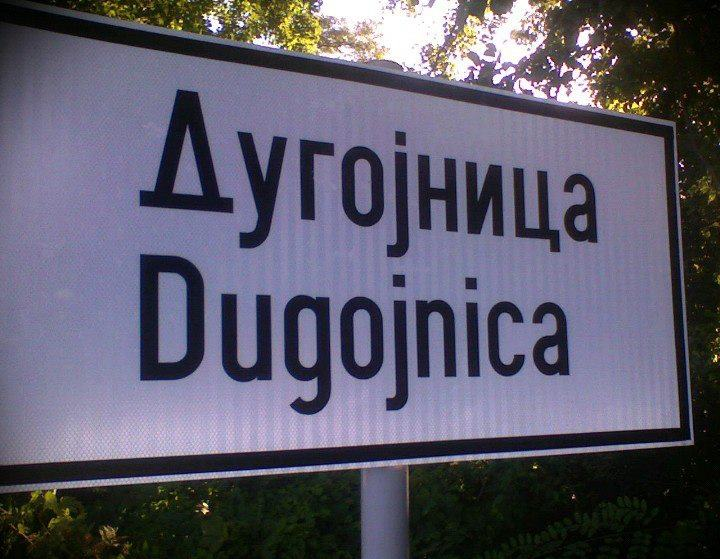
- Dugojnica Sign Post

- Location within Serbia
- Country: Serbia
- Region: Southern and Eastern Serbia
- District: Pčinja
- Municipality: Surdulica

Population (2002)
  - Total: 275
- Time zone: UTC+1 (CET)
  - Summer (DST): UTC+2 (CEST)

Dugojnica is a village in the municipality of Surdulica, Serbia. According to the 2002 census, the village has a population of 275 people.
