= Topli Dol =

Topli Dol Топли Дол
- Village
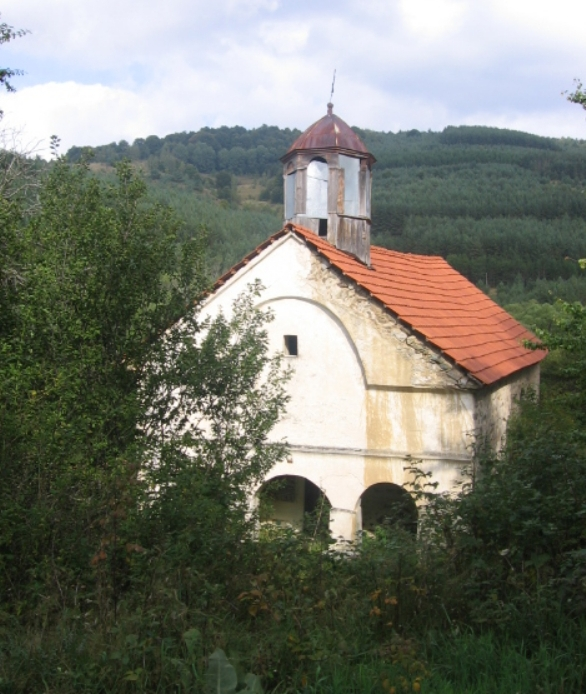
- Church in Topli Dol

- Location within Serbia
- Coordinates: 42.6064°N 22.3581°E
- Country: Serbia
- Region: Southern and Eastern Serbia
- District: Pčinja
- Municipality: Surdulica

Area
  - Total: 24.66 km^{2} (9.52 sq mi)
- Elevation: 1,325 m (4,347 ft)

Population (2011)
  - Total: 58
  - Density: 2.4/km^{2} (6.1/sq mi)
- Time zone: UTC+1 (CET)
  - Summer (DST): UTC+2 (CEST)

Topli Dol is a village located in the municipality of Surdulica, Serbia. As of 2011 census, the village has a population of 58 inhabitants.
