= Klisura (Surdulica) =

Klisura Клисура
- Village
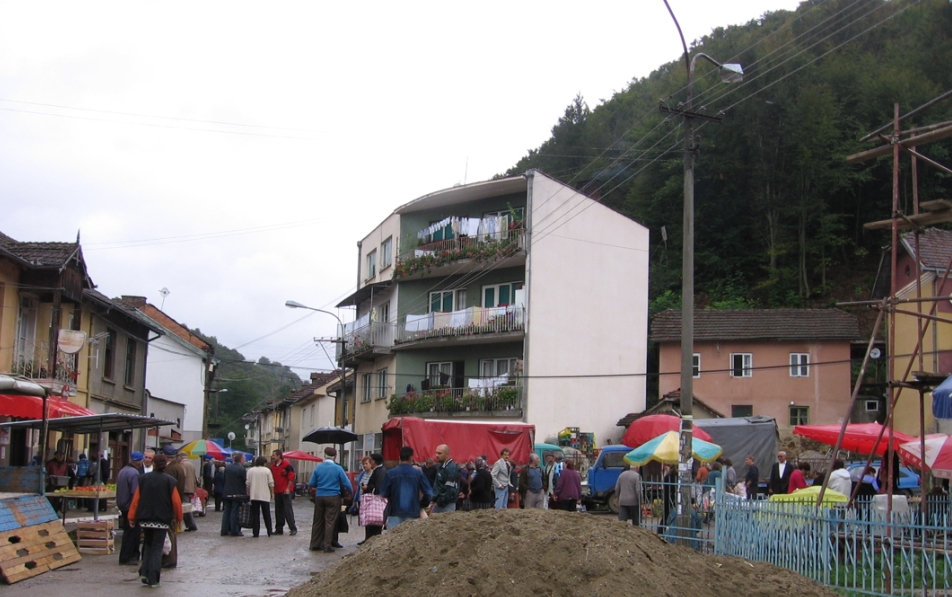
- Market Day in Klisura

- Location within Serbia
- Country: Serbia
- Region: Southern and Eastern Serbia
- District: Pčinja
- Municipality: Surdulica

Population (2002)
  - Total: 332
- Time zone: UTC+1 (CET)
  - Summer (DST): UTC+2 (CEST)

Klisura is a village in the municipality of Surdulica, Serbia. According to the 2002 census, the village has a population of 332 people. It is located at the Bulgarian border.
