= Troskač =

Troskač Троскач
- Hamlet
- Location within Serbia
- Country: Serbia
- Region: Southern and Eastern Serbia
- District: Pčinja
- Municipality: Surdulica

Population (2002)
  - Total: 3
- Time zone: UTC+1 (CET)
  - Summer (DST): UTC+2 (CEST)

Troskač is a hamlet in the municipality of Surdulica, Serbia. According to the 2002 census, the village has a population of 3 people.
