= Božica =

- Village
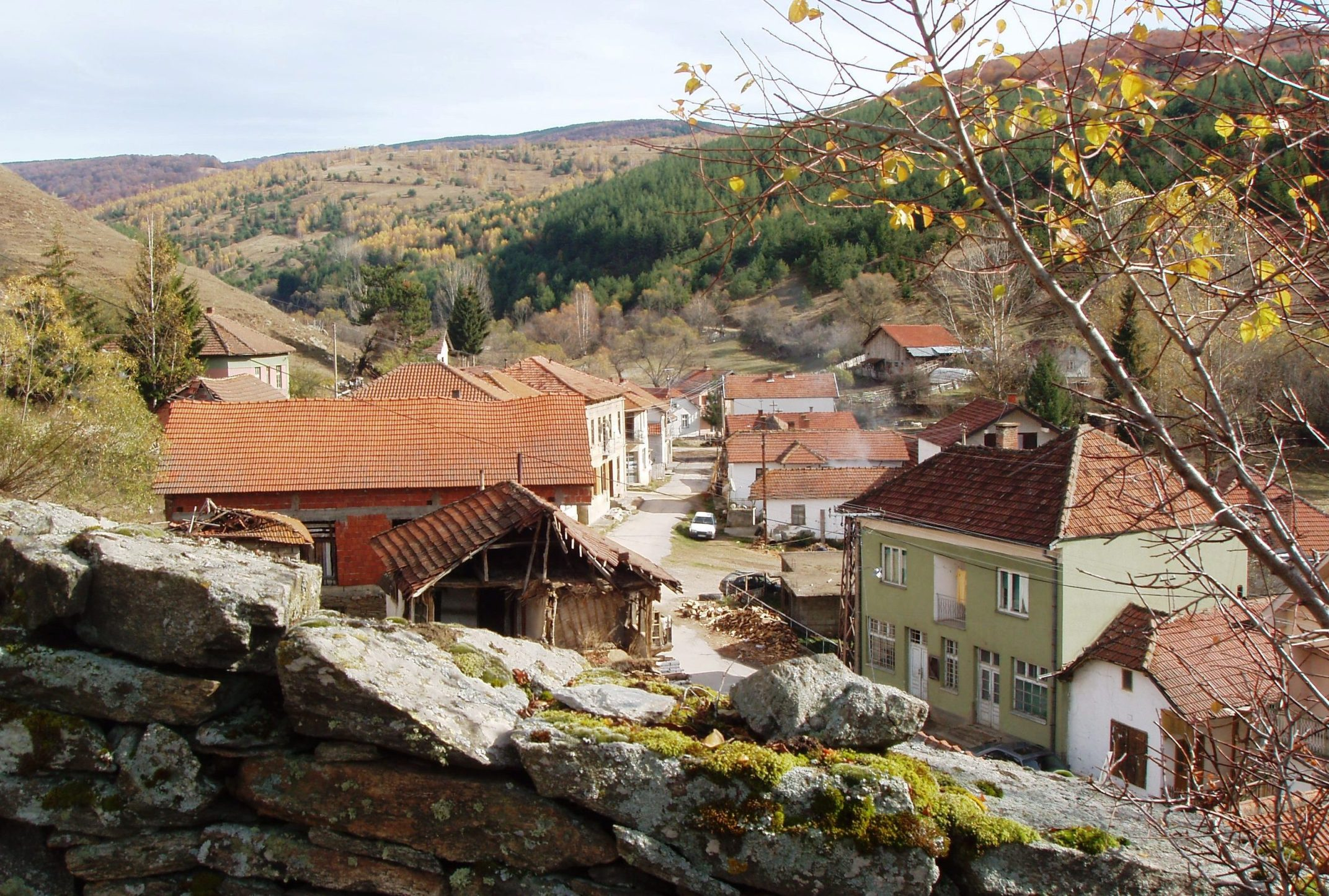

- Location within Serbia
- Coordinates: 42°37′02″N 22°24′09″E
- Country: Serbia
- District: Pčinja District
- Municipality: Surdulica

Population (2002)
  - Total: 333
- Time zone: UTC+1 (CET)
  - Summer (DST): UTC+2 (CEST)

Božica is a village in the municipality of Surdulica, Serbia. According to the 2002 census, the village has a population of 333 people.
