= Gornje Romanovce =

Gornje Romanovce Горње Романовце
- Village
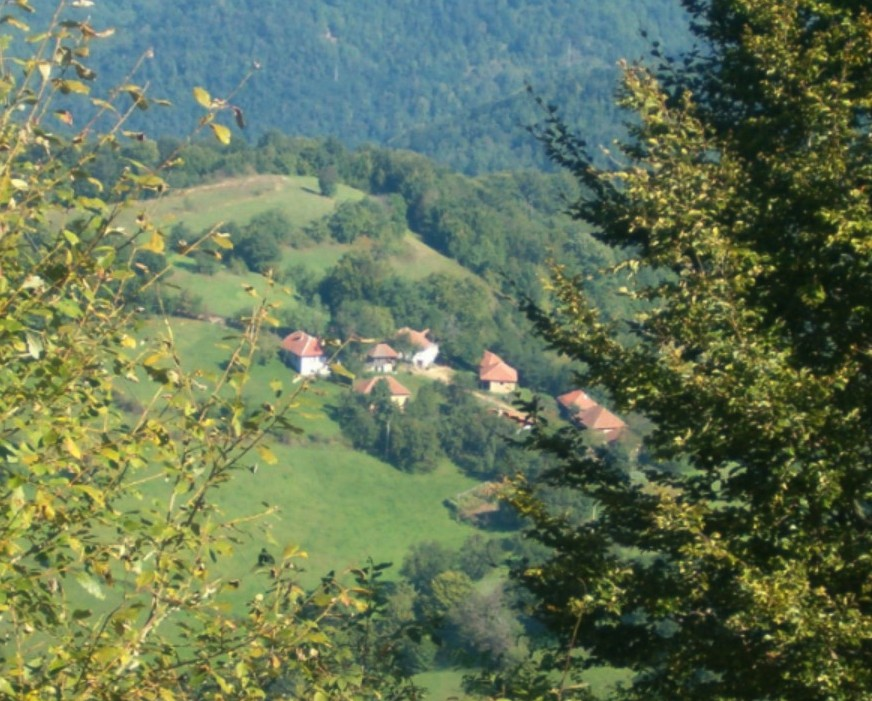
- Aerial view of Gornje Romanovce

- Location within Serbia
- Country: Serbia
- Region: Southern and Eastern Serbia
- District: Pčinja
- Municipality: Surdulica

Population (2002)
  - Total: 50
- Time zone: UTC+1 (CET)
  - Summer (DST): UTC+2 (CEST)

Gornje Romanovce is a village in the municipality of Surdulica, Serbia. According to the 2002 census, the village has a population of 50 people.

The village is of the so-called broken type. The largest are the tombs of Strahinjini, Lazarovi, Bojkovi, Kusini, Dzonini, Trajkovi, and others. The settlement of the village began in the mid-19th century, when these tombs were also created. The first two tombs, which are also the oldest, are Strahinjini and Lazarovi, that is, their ancestors migrated from the Novkovi tomb to the village of Božica (Surdulica) from the place that was then Bulgaria, now Serbia.
