= Novo Selo (Surdulica) =

Novo Selo Ново Село
- Village
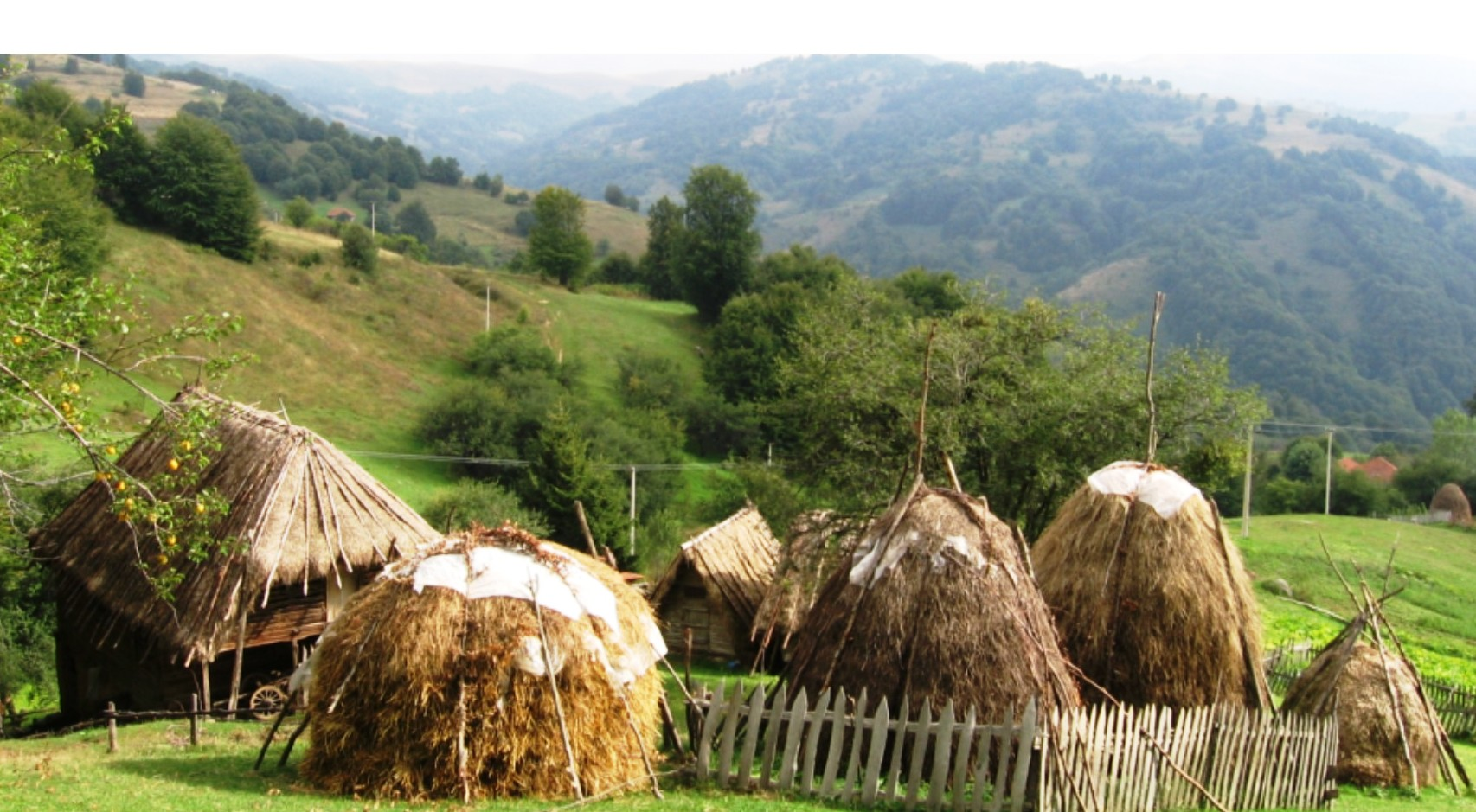
- Novo Selo Landscape

- Location within Serbia
- Country: Serbia
- Region: Southern and Eastern Serbia
- District: Pčinja
- Municipality: Surdulica

Population (2002)
  - Total: 211
- Time zone: UTC+1 (CET)
  - Summer (DST): UTC+2 (CEST)

Novo Selo is a village in the municipality of Surdulica, Serbia. According to the 2002 census the village has a population of 211 people. The etymology of the village comes from Slavic languages meaning new village, Novo Selo.
