= Vučadelce =

Vučadelce Вучаделце
- Village
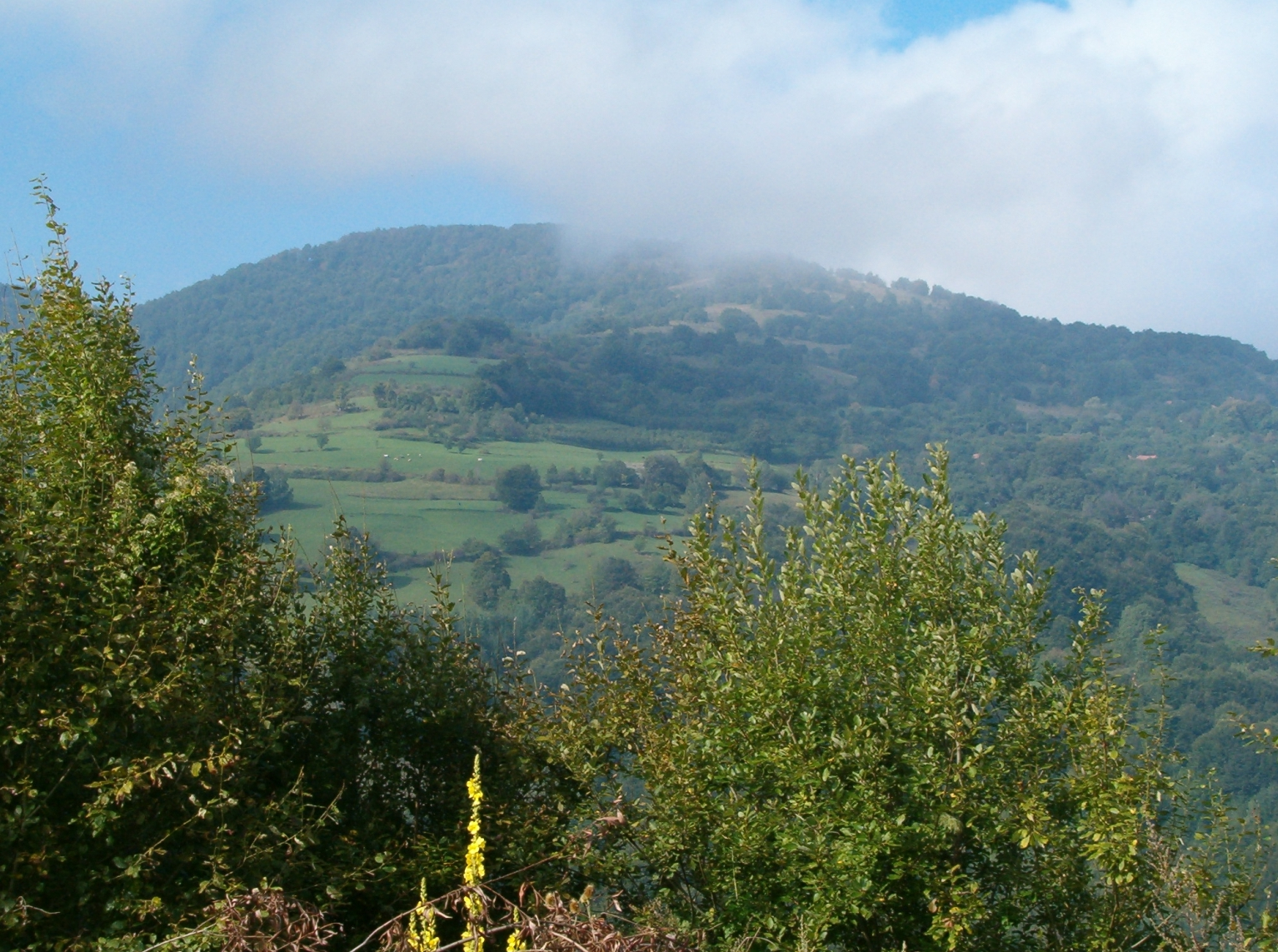

- Location within Serbia
- Country: Serbia
- Region: Southern and Eastern Serbia
- District: Pčinja
- Municipality: Surdulica

Population (2002)
  - Total: 50
- Time zone: UTC+1 (CET)
  - Summer (DST): UTC+2 (CEST)

Vučadelce is a village in the municipality of Surdulica, Serbia. According to the 2002 census, the village has a population of 50 people.
