= Rđavica =

Rđavica Рђавица
- Village
- Location within Serbia
- Country: Serbia
- Region: Southern and Eastern Serbia
- District: Pčinja
- Municipality: Surdulica

Population (2002)
  - Total: 40
- Time zone: UTC+1 (CET)
  - Summer (DST): UTC+2 (CEST)

Rđavica is a village in the municipality of Surdulica, Serbia. According to the 2002 census, the village has a population of 40 people. In the village of Rđavica, there are 38 adult inhabitants, and the average age of the population is 57.6 years (56.9 for men and 58.3 for women). There are 22 households in the settlement, and the average number of members per household is 1.82.
