= Vlasina Rid =

Vlasina Rid Власина Рид
- Village
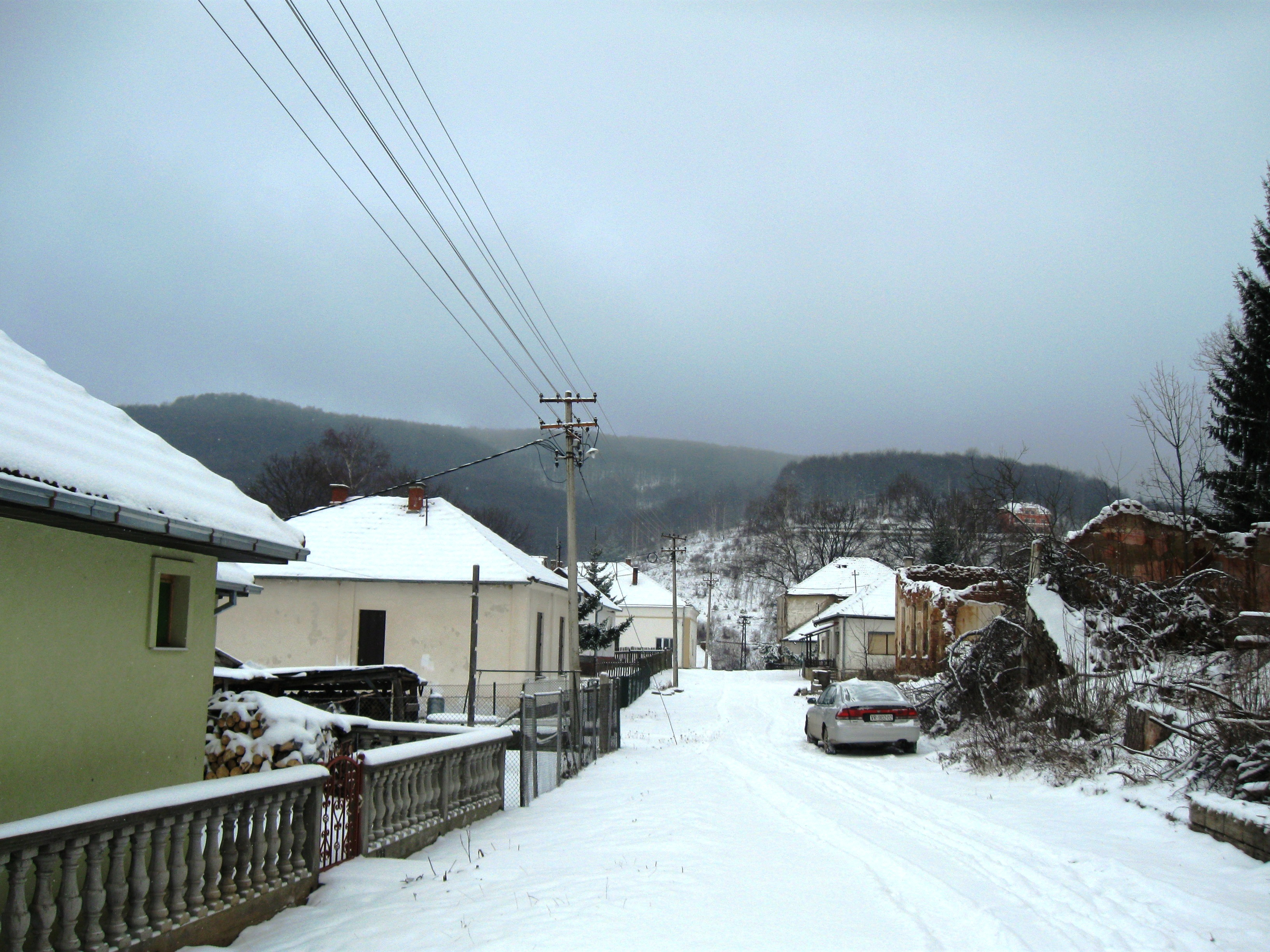
- Winter in Vlasina Rid.

- Location within Serbia
- Country: Serbia
- Region: Southern and Eastern Serbia
- District: Pčinja
- Municipality: Surdulica

Population (2002)
  - Total: 276
- Time zone: UTC+1 (CET)
  - Summer (DST): UTC+2 (CEST)

Vlasina Rid is a village in the municipality of Surdulica, Serbia. According to the 2002 census, the village has a population of 276 people.

== Gallery ==
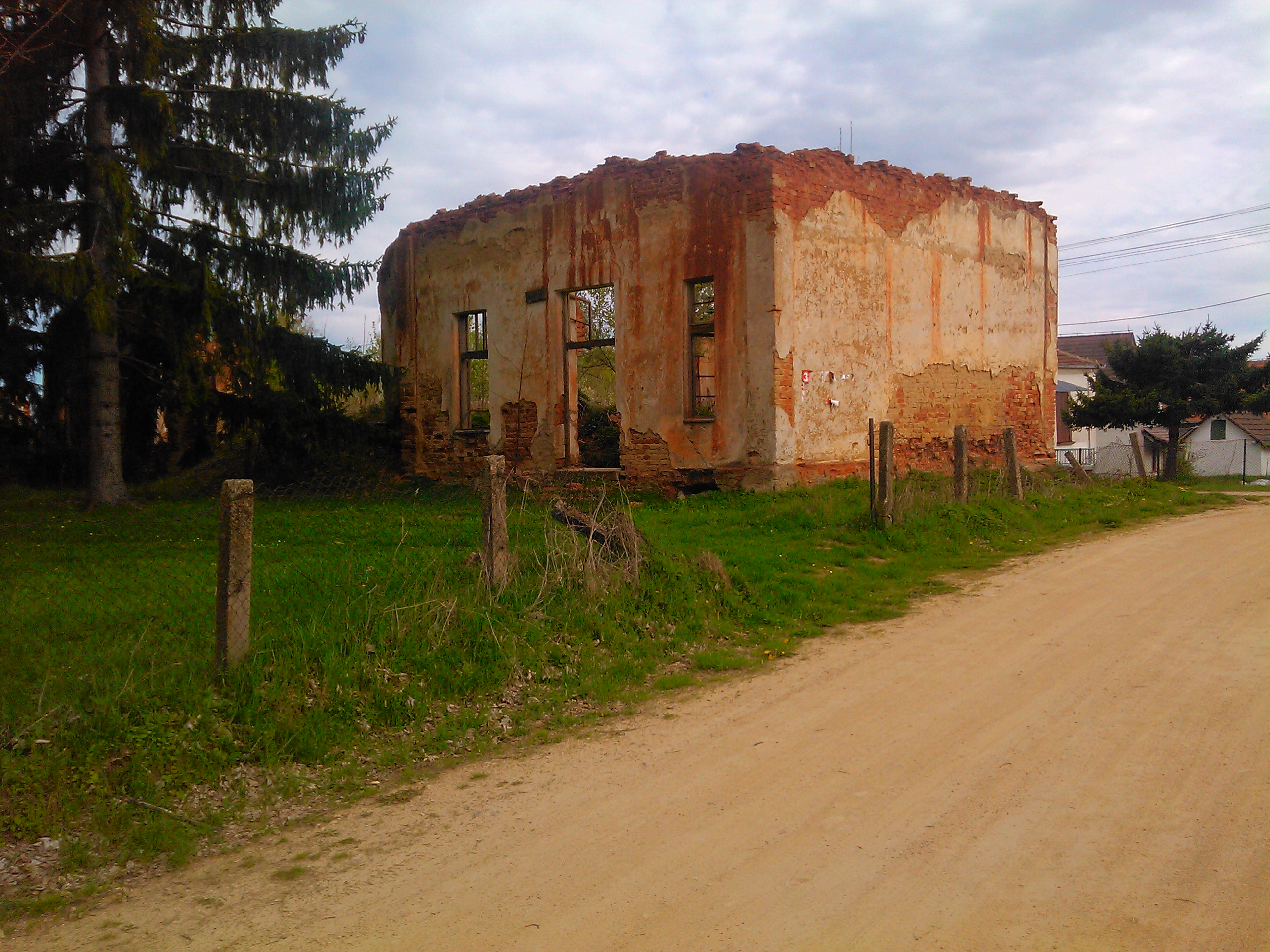
Former Primary school.

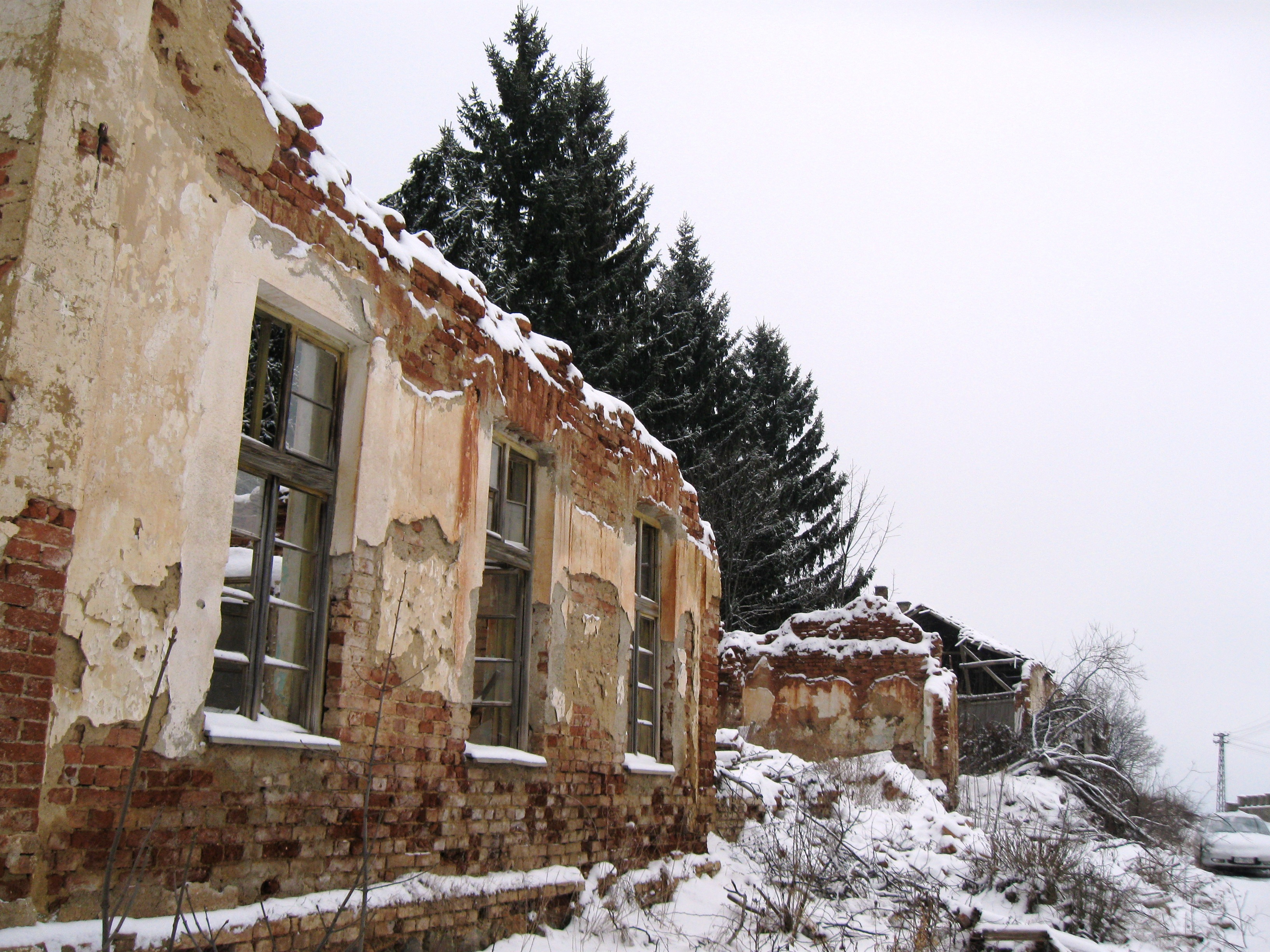
Former Primary school.

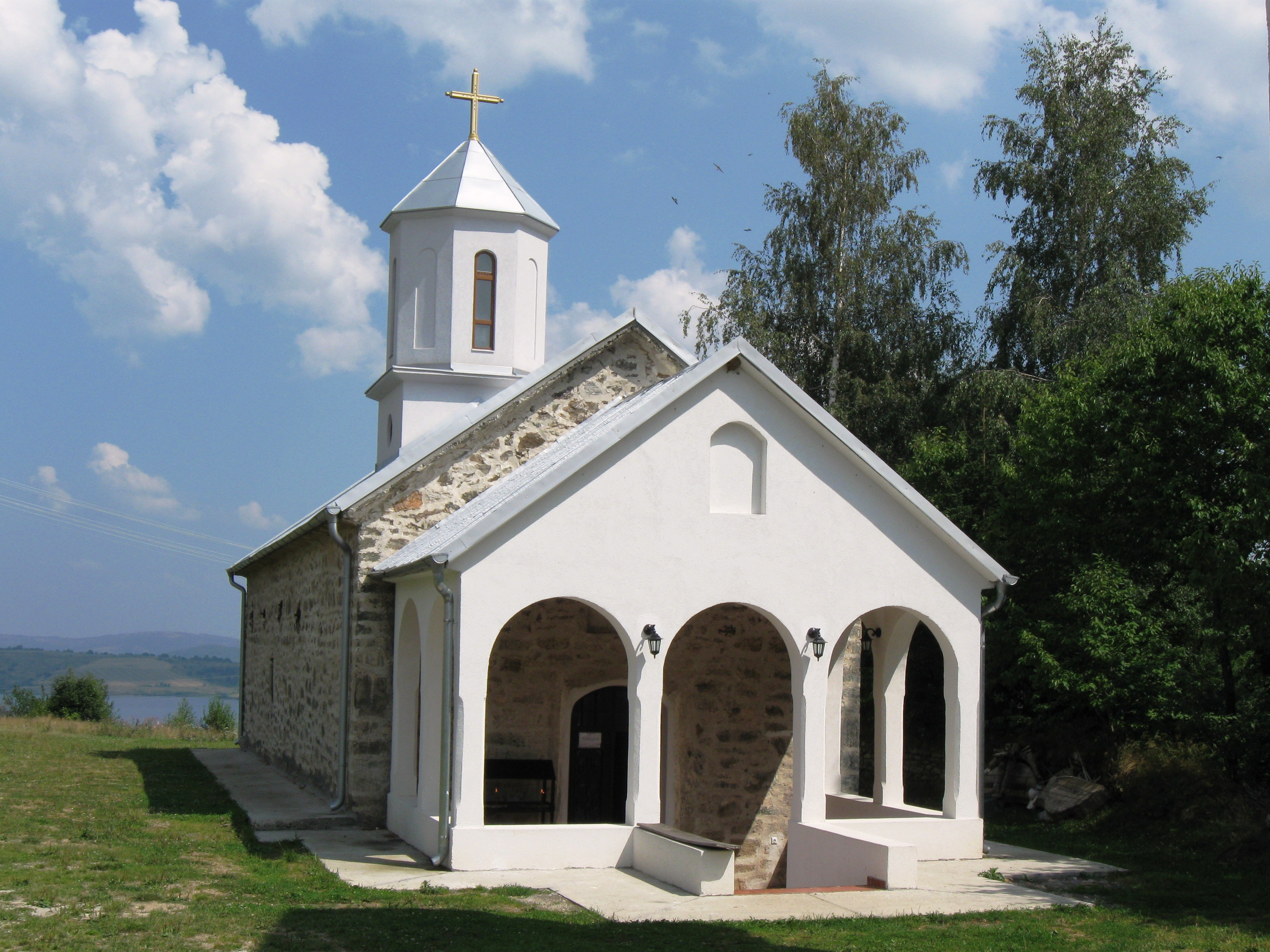
Orthodox church.

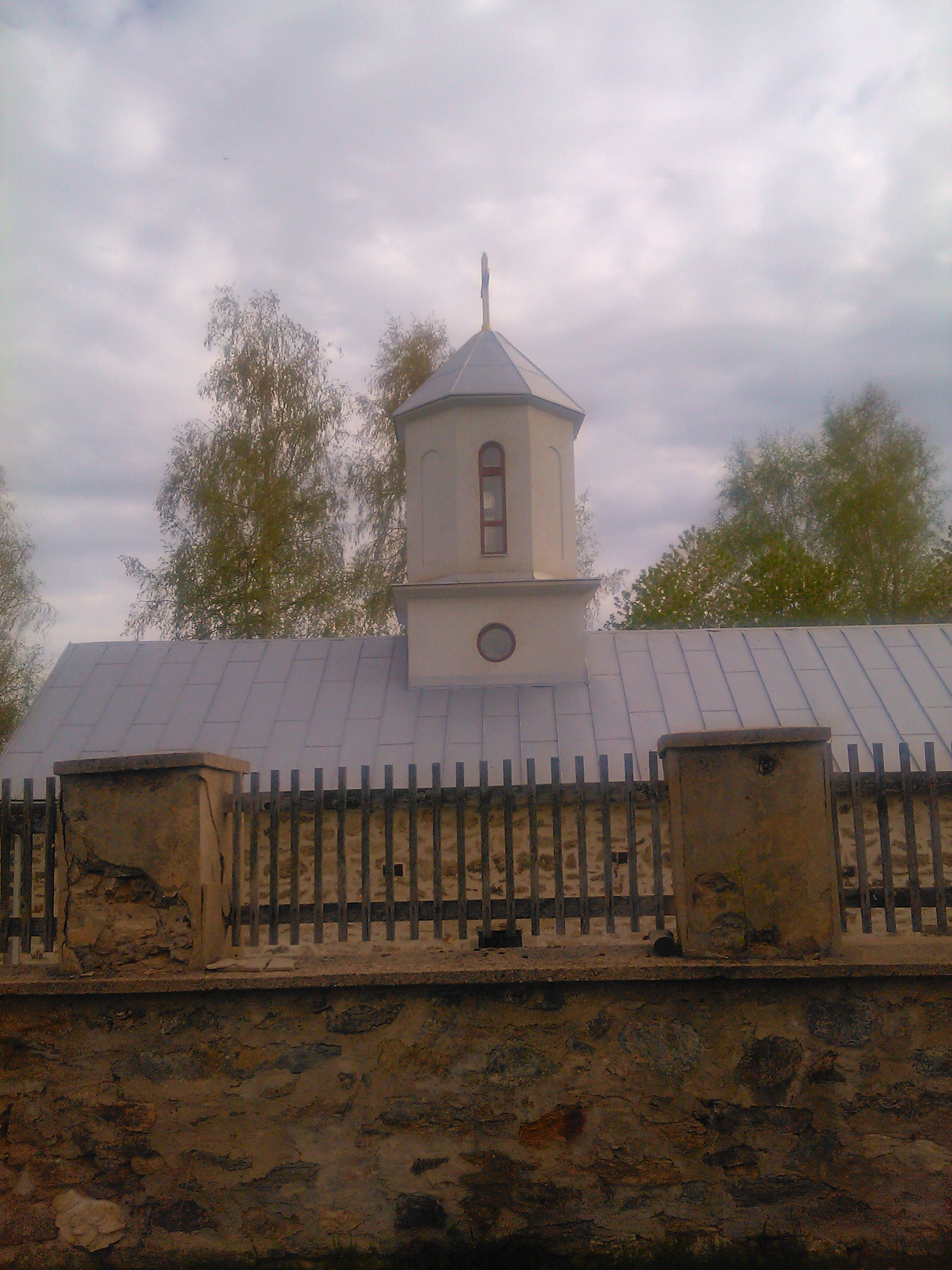
Orthodox church.

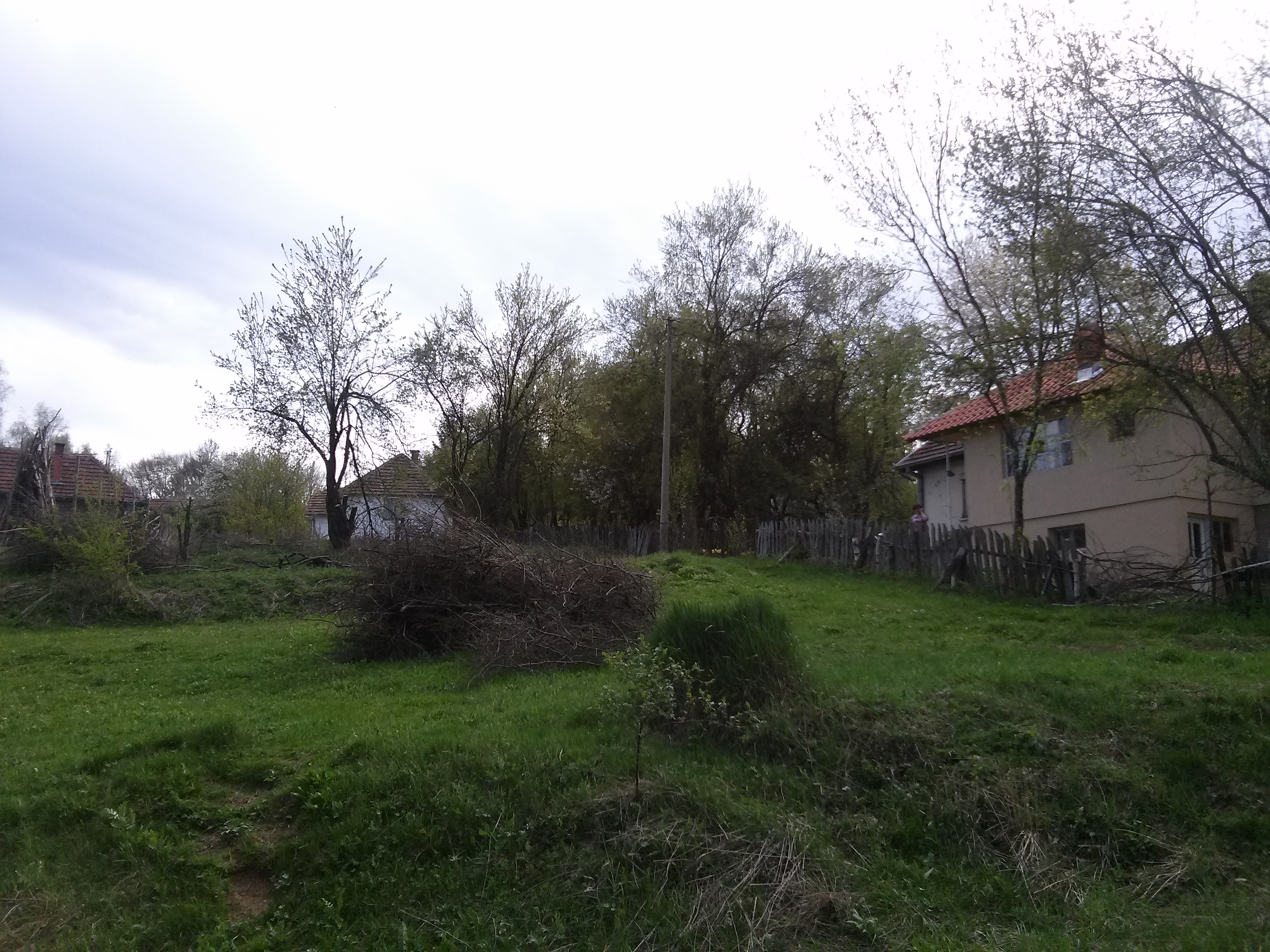
Lujinci quarter.

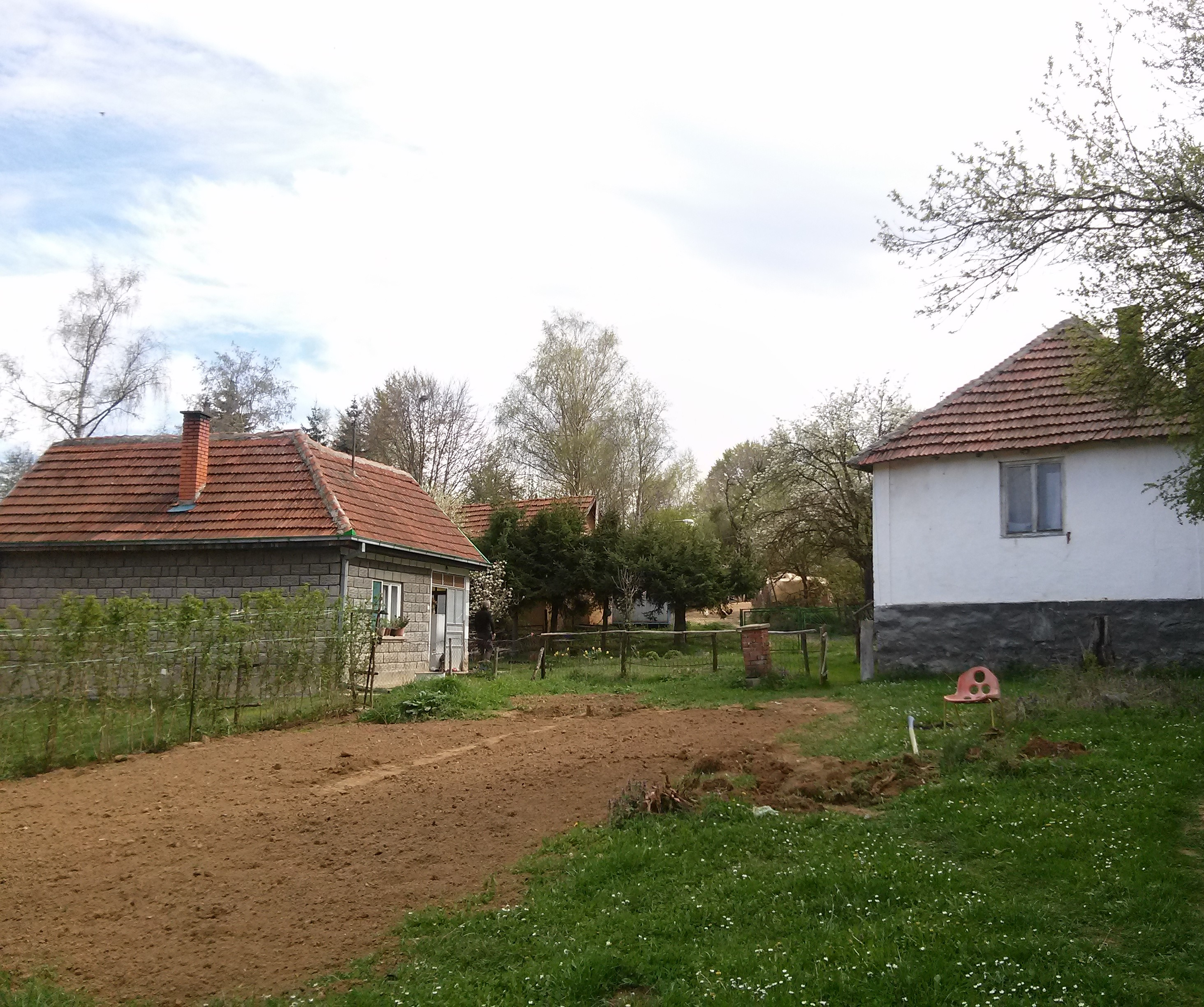
Lujinci quarter.

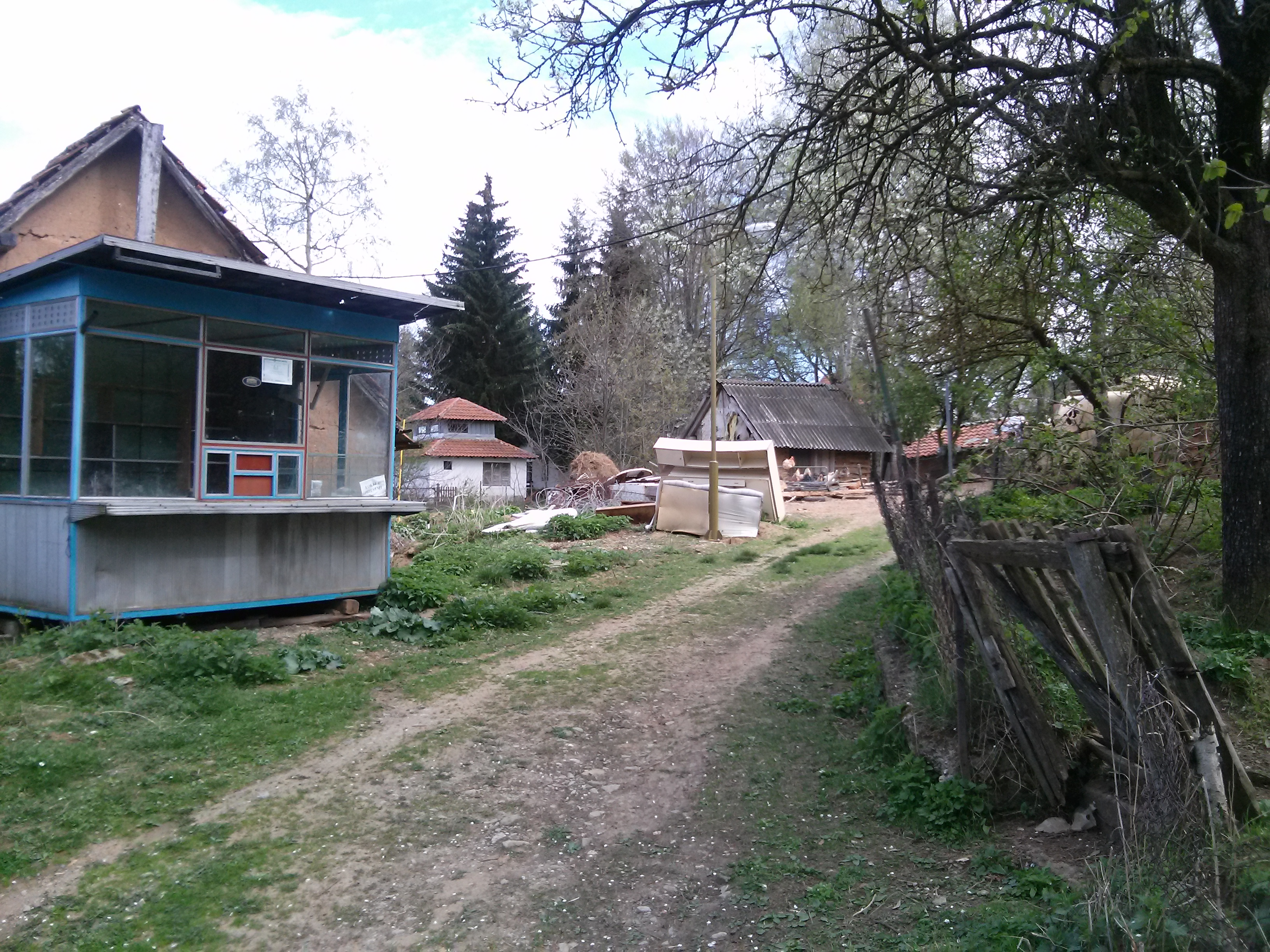
Lujinci quarter.
