= Suhi Dol (Surdulica) =

Suhi Dol Сухи Дол
- Village
- Location within Serbia
- Coordinates: 42°45′N 22°25′E
- Country: Serbia
- District: Pčinja District
- Municipality: Surdulica

Population (2002)
  - Total: 69
- Time zone: UTC+1 (CET)
  - Summer (DST): UTC+2 (CEST)

Suhi Dol (Serbian: Сухи Дол; Bulgarian: Сухи дол, romanized: Suhi dol) is a village in the municipality of Surdulica, Serbia. According to the 2002 census, the village has a population of 69 people.
