= Kolunica =

Kolunica Колуница
- Hamlet
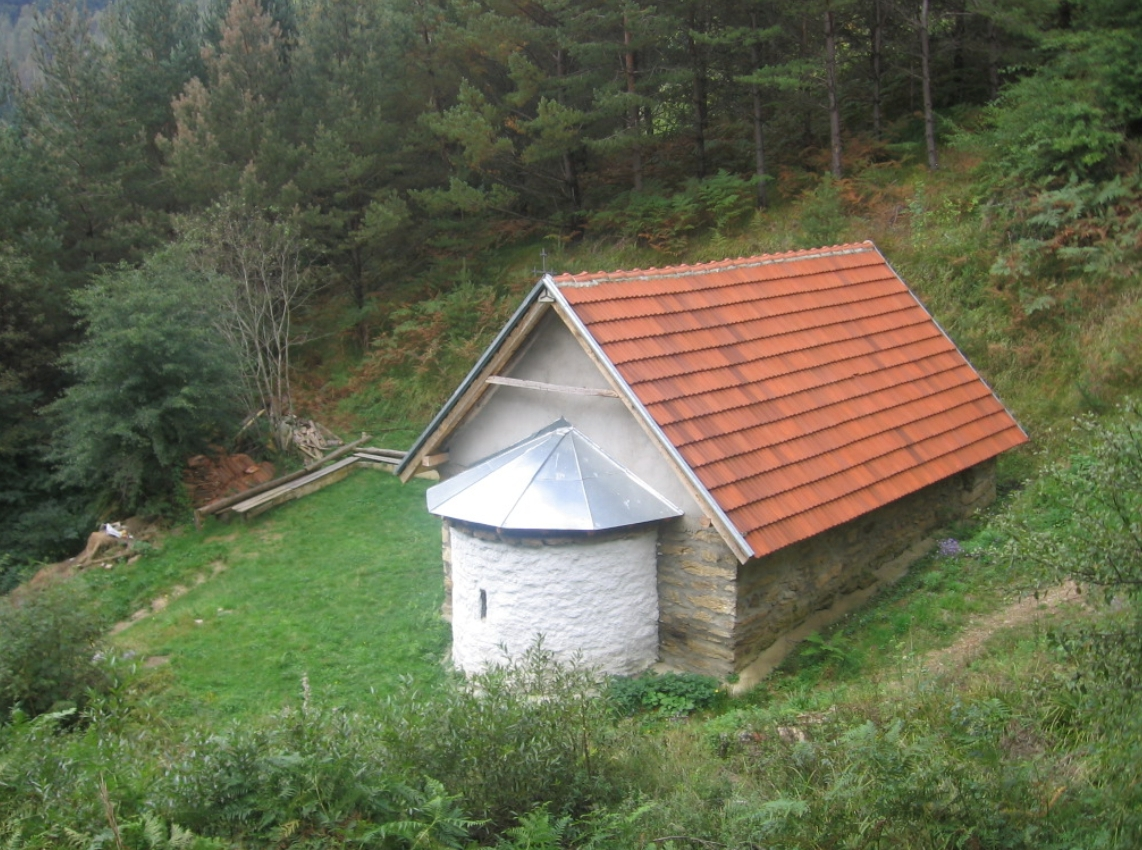
- Church of Holy Archangels in Kolunica

- Location within Serbia
- Country: Serbia
- Region: Southern and Eastern Serbia
- District: Pčinja
- Municipality: Surdulica

Population (2002)
  - Total: 7
- Time zone: UTC+1 (CET)
  - Summer (DST): UTC+2 (CEST)

Kolunica is a hamlet in the municipality of Surdulica, Serbia. According to the 2002 census, the village has a population of 7 people. It is located close to the Bulgarian border.
