= Vlasina Okruglica =

- Village
- Location within Serbia
- Coordinates: 42°39′N 22°19′E
- Country: Serbia
- District: Pčinja District
- Municipality: Surdulica

Population (2002)
  - Total: 163
- Time zone: UTC+1 (CET)
  - Summer (DST): UTC+2 (CEST)

Vlasina Okruglica is a village in the municipality of Surdulica, Serbia. According to the 2002 census, the village has a population of 163 people.
