= Belo Polje, Surdulica =

Belo Polje Бело Поље
- Town
- Location within Serbia
- Coordinates: 42°42′13″N 22°09′24″E
- Country: Serbia
- Region: Southern and Eastern Serbia
- District: Pčinja
- Municipality: Surdulica

Population (2002)
  - Total: 545
- Time zone: UTC+1 (CET)
  - Summer (DST): UTC+2 (CEST)

Belo Polje (Serbian Cyrillic: Бело Поље) is a town in Serbia. It is situated in the Surdulica municipality, in the Pčinja District. The population of the town is 545 people (2002 census).
