= Surdulica =

Surdulica Сурдулица (Serbian)
- Town and municipality
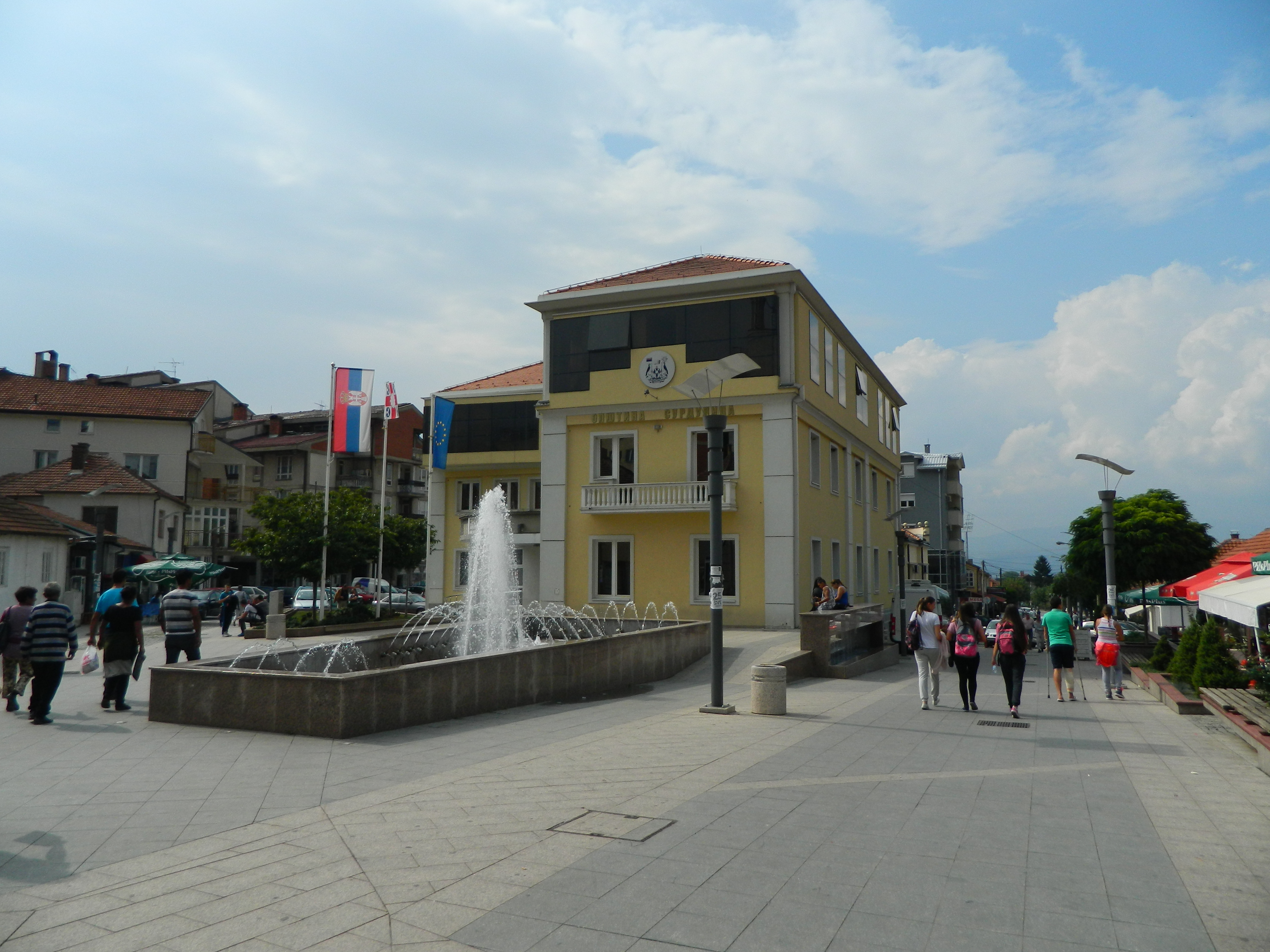
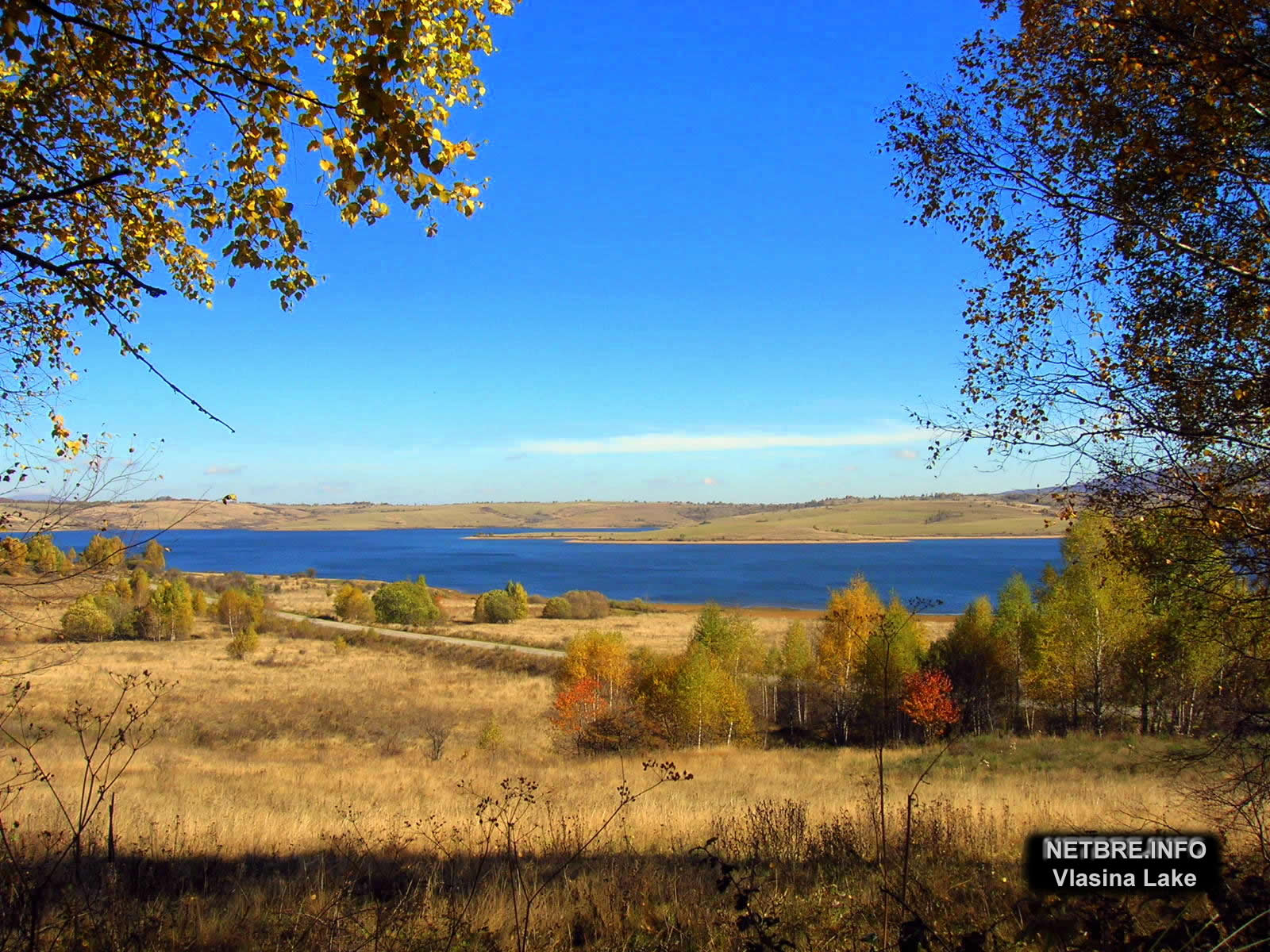
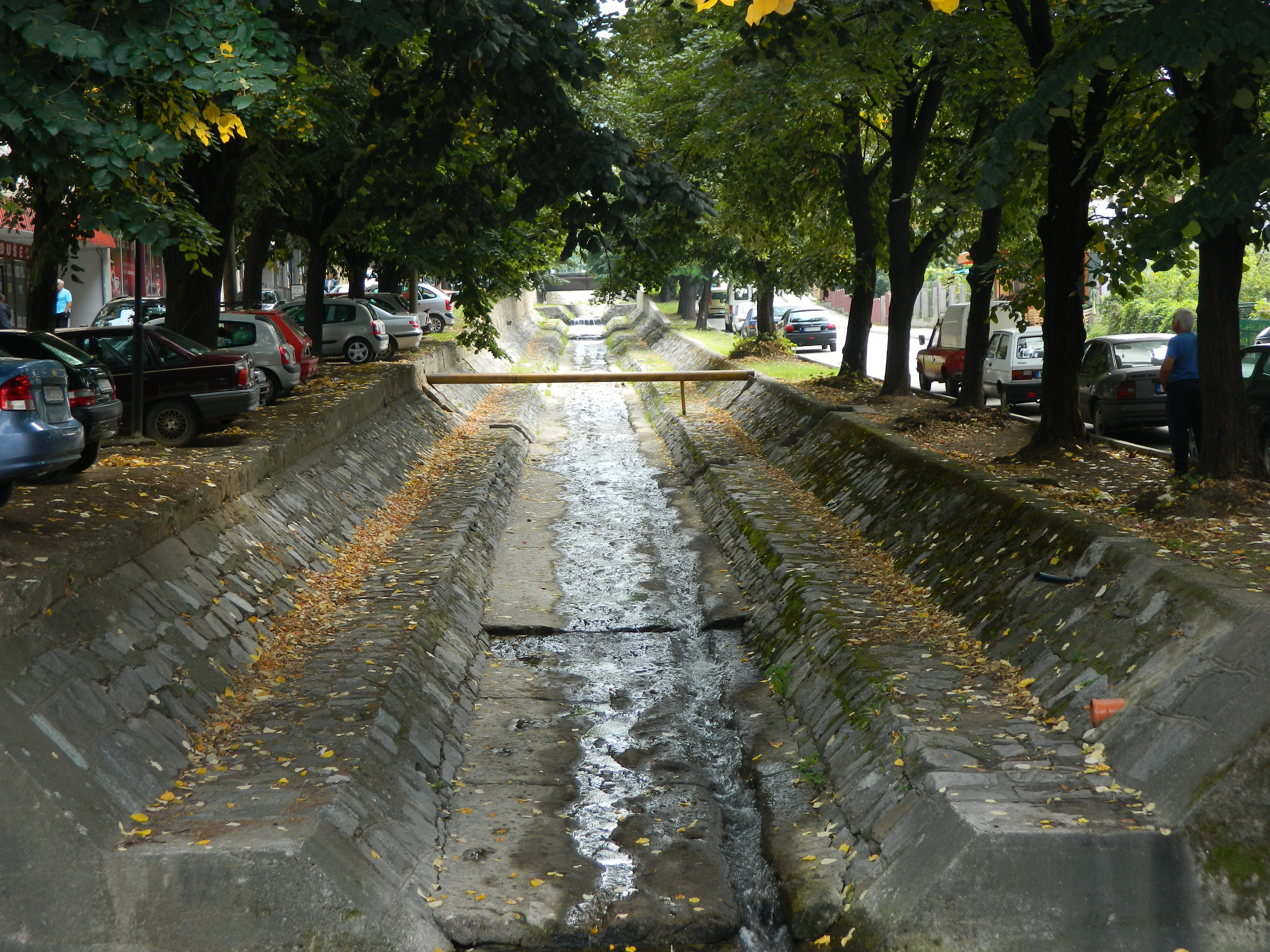
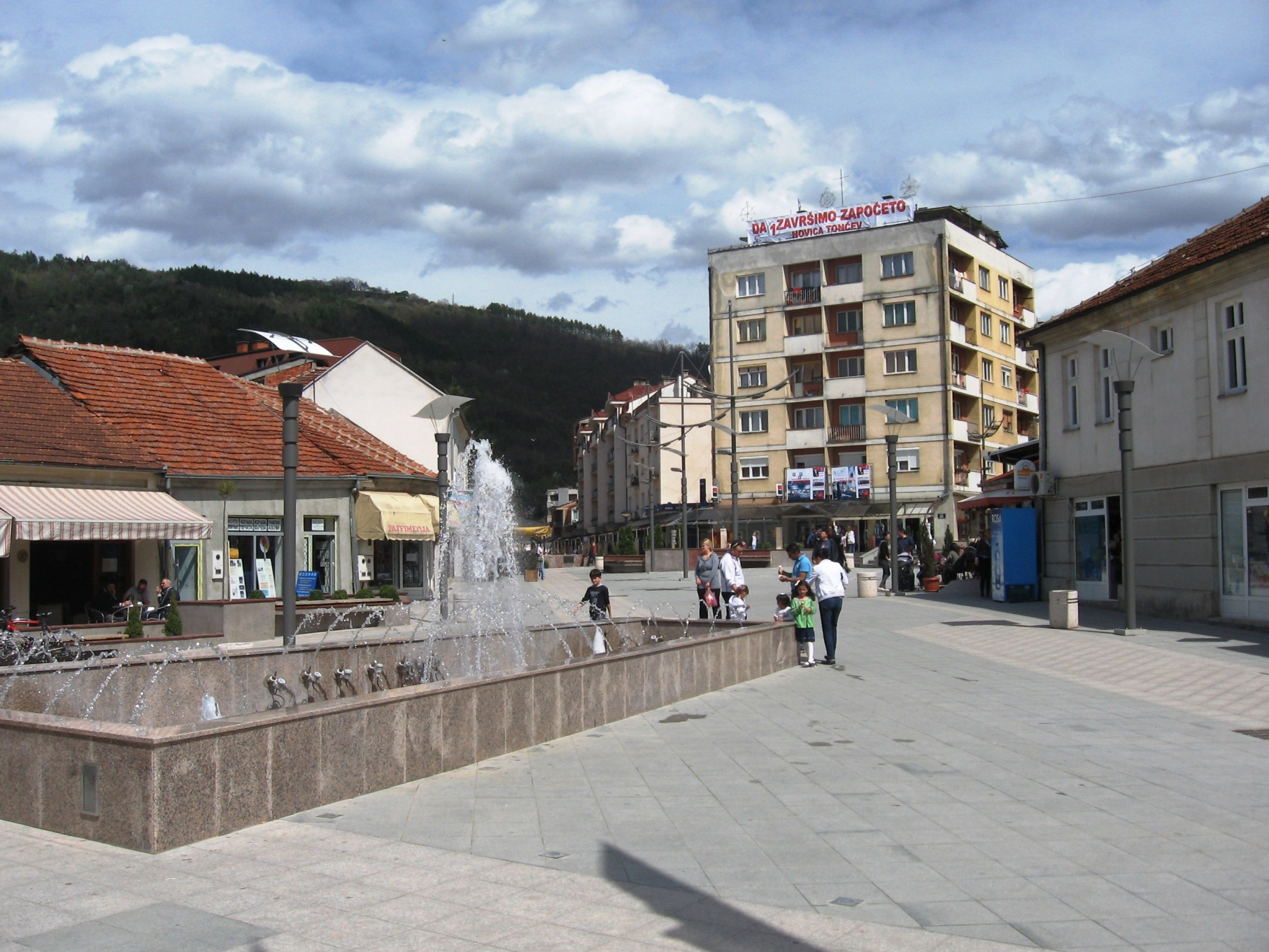
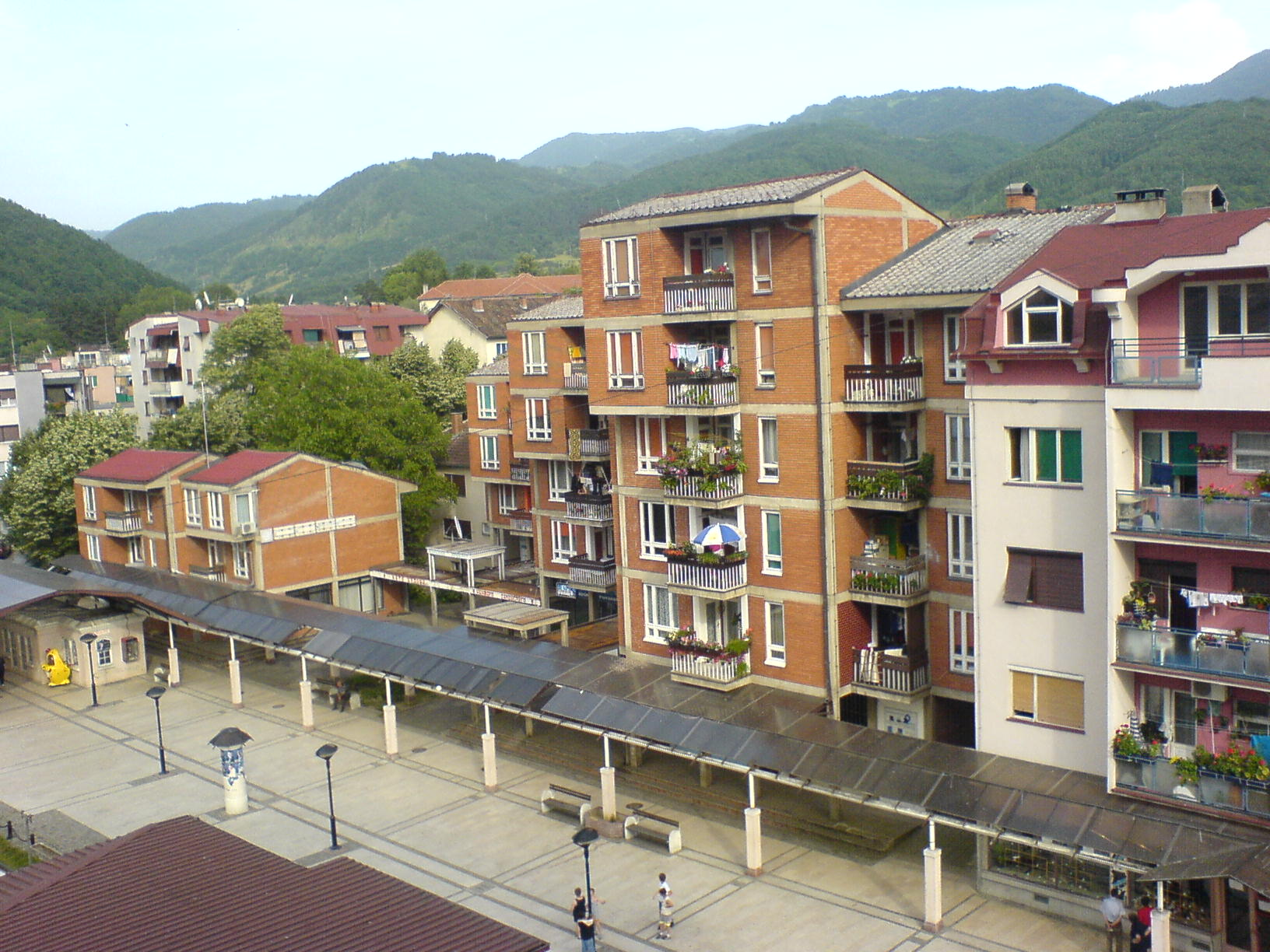
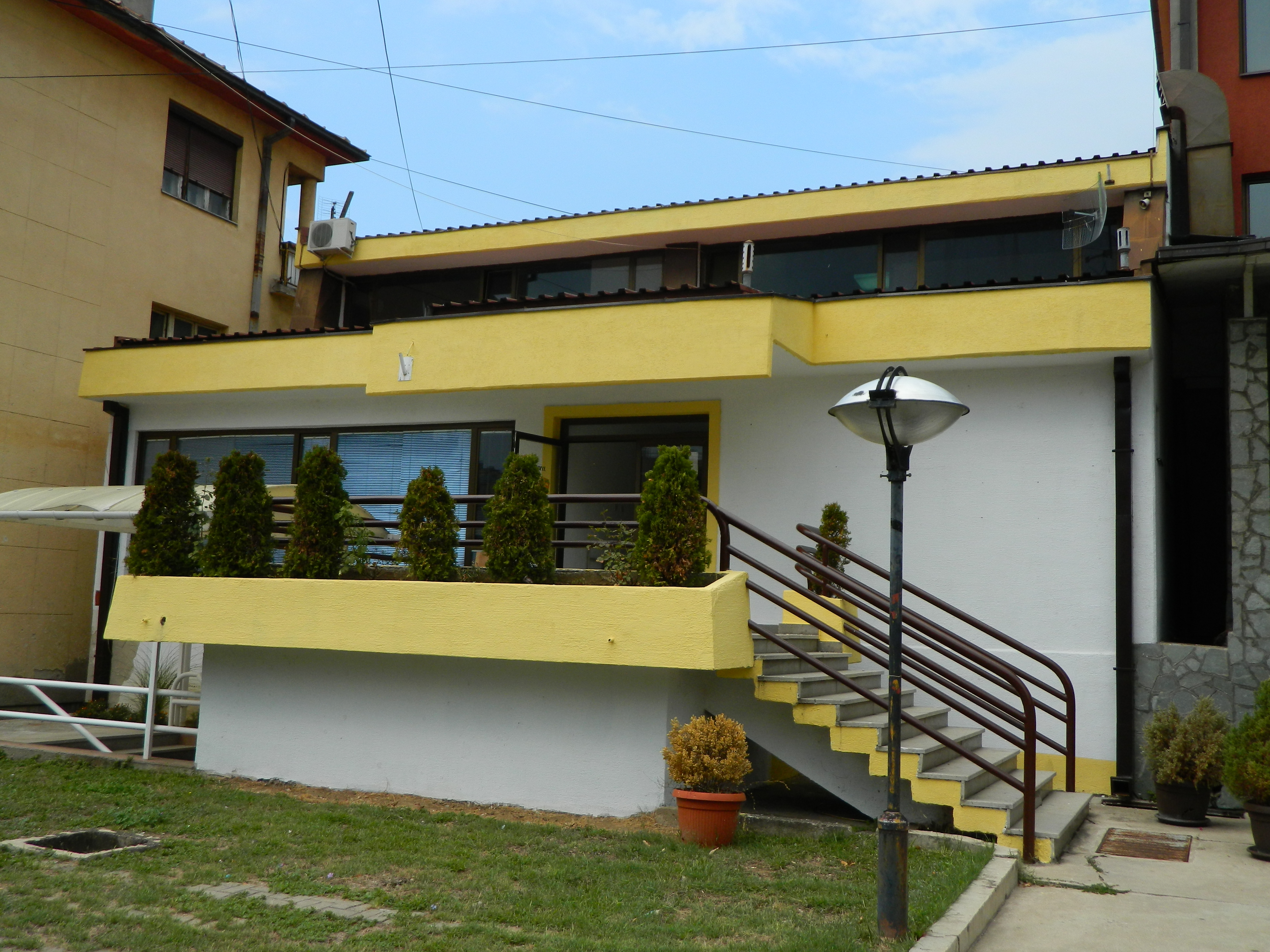
- Surdulica

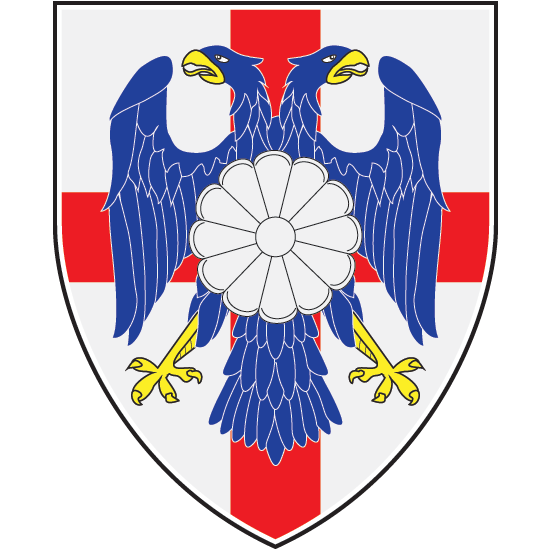
- Coat of arms

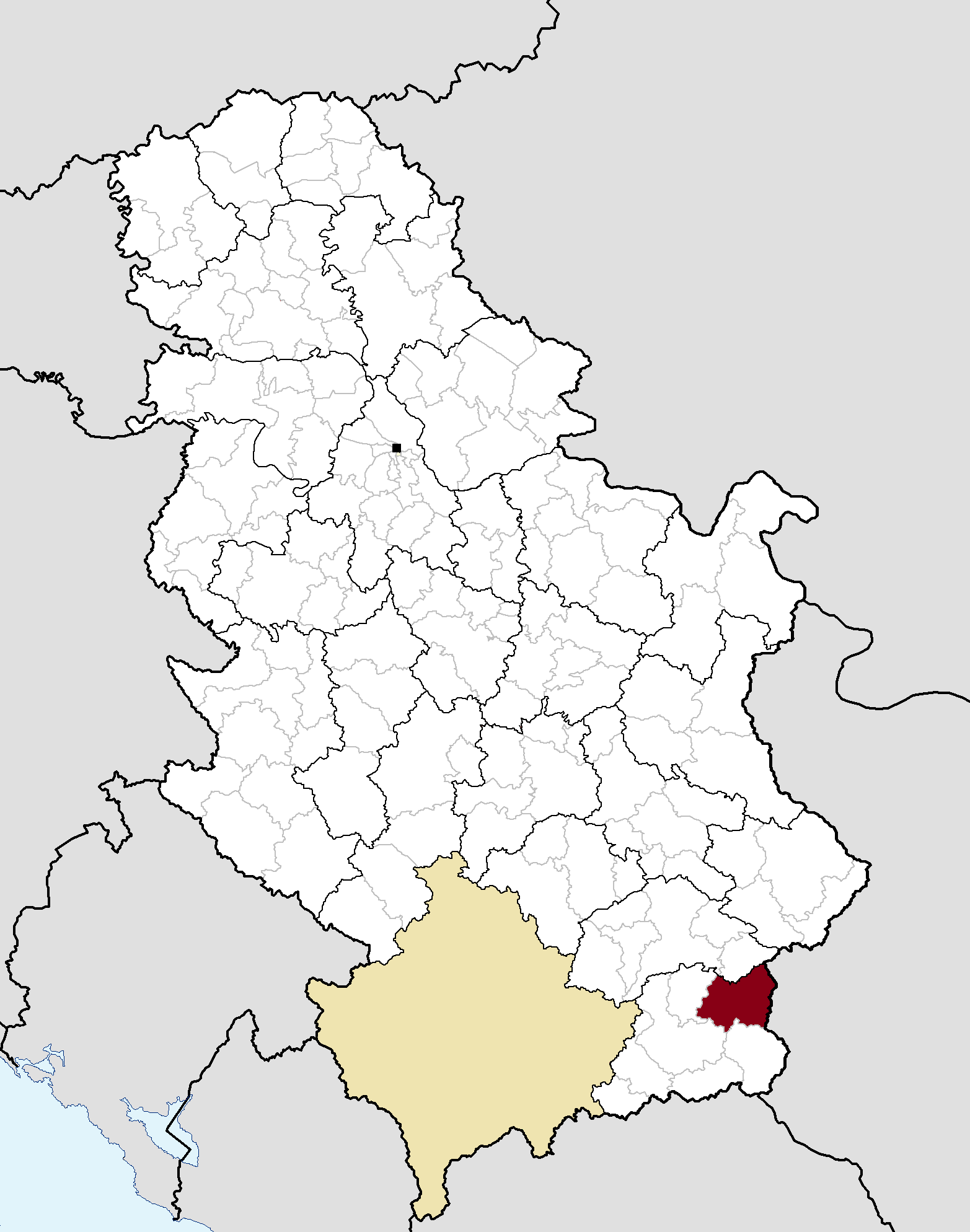
- Location of the municipality of Surdulica within Serbia
- Coordinates: 42°41′N 22°10′E
- Country: Serbia
- Region: Southern and Eastern Serbia
- District: Pčinja
- Settlements: 41

Government
  - Mayor: Aleksandra Popović (SPS)

Area
  - Town: 8.58 km^{2} (3.31 sq mi)
  - Municipality: 628 km^{2} (242 sq mi)
- Elevation: 526 m (1,726 ft)

Population (2022 census)
  - Town: 9,242
  - Town density: 1,080/km^{2} (2,790/sq mi)
  - Municipality: 16,991
  - Municipality density: 27.1/km^{2} (70.1/sq mi)
- Time zone: UTC+1 (CET)
  - Summer (DST): UTC+2 (CEST)
- Postal code: 17530
- Area code: +381(0)17
- Car plates: SC
- Website: www.surdulica.org

Surdulica (Serbian Cyrillic: Сурдулица) is a town and municipality located in the Pčinja District of southern Serbia. As of 2022, the population of the town is 9,242, while the municipality has 16,991 inhabitants.

== History ==
=== Massacre during World War I ===
During World War I, 2,000–3,000 men were massacred by Bulgarian forces in the town from 1915 to 1916.

=== 1999 NATO bombings ===
Over the course of the 1999 NATO bombing of Yugoslavia, Surdulica was subject to NATO bombings on multiple occasions. By the end of the bombing campaign, approximately fifty homes were destroyed and around 600 more were damaged in Surdulica alone. On April 27, 1999, NATO missiles struck several houses in the southern town of Surdulica. A CNN journalist named Alessio Vinci subsequently visited the local morgue, where he reported 16 civilians killed as a result of the attack. One of Serbia's public broadcasters, RTS, reported that 20 civilians were killed during the April 27 bombings, whereas Human Rights Watch only recorded eleven deaths. Many of the victims had been killed in a single house on Zmaj Jova street,^{1} owned by Vojislav Milić. Milić's family and several neighbors took refuge in Milić's basement when his house was struck by two bombs, after which nine people were killed in his house alone.

Over the night of May 30–31, 1999, NATO airstrikes destroyed a sanatorium and a retirement home in Surdulica. Human Rights Watch published the names of the 23 civilians killed in the sanatorium.

== Geography ==
The town stands at 480 m above sea level; it is surrounded by mountains to the north by Čemernik and to the south by Vardenik; the highest peak Strešer stands at 1875 meters high. Some twenty kilometres along the river Vrla and up the mountains there is a highland called Vlasina. In the 1950s, a man made dam created a lake called Vlasinsko Jezero (Vlasina Lake) which is famous for its peat floating islands which were harvested by local farmers. The highland of Vlasina is unique natural reserve with rich wildlife in particular the many rare species of migrating birds that use this unique place as a stop on their migrating way north or south. The lake is rich with fish and is one of largest reservoirs of clean water in that part of the country. The surrounding soil is lush and green resembling the Devon Downs or Argentine pampas. It presents great potential for cattle breeding and dairy production. It has distinct four seasons with long snowy winters and brief hot summers. There are also two streams running from the mountains and joining at the town of Surdulica. This is where the Romanovce River joins the Vrla River on their way to South Morava and thence to the Danube and the Black Sea.

== Settlements ==
Municipality of Surdulica in Pčinja District

Aside from the town of Surdulica, the municipality includes the following settlements:

- Alakince
- Bacijevce
- Belo Polje
- Binovce
- Bitvrđa
- Božica
- Vlasina Okruglica
- Vlasina Rid
- Vlasina Stojkovićeva
- Vučadelce
- Gornja Koznica
- Gornje Romanovce
- Groznatovci
- Danjino Selo
- Dikava
- Donje Romanovce
- Drajinci
- Dugi Del
- Dugojnica
- Zagužanje
- Jelašnica
- Kalabovce
- Kijevac
- Klisura
- Kolunica
- Kostroševci
- Leskova Bara
- Masurica
- Mačkatica
- Novo Selo
- Palja
- Rđavica
- Stajkovce
- Strezimirovci
- Suvojnica
- Suhi Dol
- Topli Do
- Topli Dol
- Troskač
- Ćurkovica

== Demographics ==
Historical population
| Year | Pop. | ±% p.a. |
|---|---|---|
| 1948 | 32,747 | — |
| 1953 | 35,578 | +1.67% |
| 1961 | 32,505 | −1.12% |
| 1971 | 29,494 | −0.97% |
| 1981 | 27,029 | −0.87% |
| 1991 | 24,785 | −0.86% |
| 2002 | 22,190 | −1.00% |
| 2011 | 20,319 | −0.97% |
| 2022 | 16,991 | −1.61% |

According to the 2011 census results, the municipality of Surdulica has a population of 20,319 inhabitants.

=== Ethnic groups ===
The ethnic composition of the municipality of Surdulica:

| Ethnic group | Population | % |
|---|---|---|
| Serbs | 16,233 | 79.89% |
| Romani | 2,531 | 12.46% |
| Bulgarians | 734 | 3.61% |
| Macedonians | 31 | 0.15% |
| Others | 790 | 3.89% |
| Total | 20,319 | |

== Economy ==
The following table gives a preview of total number of registered people employed in legal entities per their core activity (as of 2018):

| Activity | Total |
|---|---|
| Agriculture, forestry and fishing | 55 |
| Mining and quarrying | - |
| Manufacturing | 1,123 |
| Electricity, gas, steam and air conditioning supply | 154 |
| Water supply; sewerage, waste management and remediation activities | 105 |
| Construction | 456 |
| Wholesale and retail trade, repair of motor vehicles and motorcycles | 515 |
| Transportation and storage | 170 |
| Accommodation and food services | 164 |
| Information and communication | 29 |
| Financial and insurance activities | 23 |
| Real estate activities | - |
| Professional, scientific and technical activities | 108 |
| Administrative and support service activities | 60 |
| Public administration and defense; compulsory social security | 358 |
| Education | 362 |
| Human health and social work activities | 507 |
| Arts, entertainment and recreation | 107 |
| Other service activities | 58 |
| Individual agricultural workers | 13 |
| Total | 4,346 |

== Education ==
There are two primary schools in the town of Surdulica - Vuk Karadžić and Jovan Jovanović Zmaj, and several schools in the villages around the town. There are three secondary schools: Svetozar Marković Gimnazija (Grammar School), Josif Pančić School of Agriculture and a technical college, Nikola Tesla. In line with falling population in the municipality of Surdulica the number of high school students is also falling.

== Sports ==
The local football team is FK Radnik Surdulica, which play in the Serbian SuperLiga.

== See also ==
- List of places in Serbia

== Notes and references ==
Notes

- ^1 Zmaj Jova street is named after Jovan Jovanović Zmaj. Serbian variations of nouns are such that the street is spelled as "Zmaj Jove" (as opposed to having an "a" letter at the end) in the context of the sentence in the OK Radio article on the Milić family from Surdulica.

Sources

- Reiss, R. A. (1919). "Sourdoulitza" (in French). Paris: Bernard Grasset.
