= Orašje (disambiguation) =

Orašje is a town and municipality in Bosnia and Herzegovina.

Orašje may also refer to:

- HNK Orašje, a football club from Orašje

== Places ==
- Orašje (Dubravica), a hamlet in Dubravica, Serbia
- Orašje (Varvarin), a village in the municipality of Varvarin, Serbia
- Orašje (Vlasotince), a village in the municipality of Vlasotince, Serbia
- Orašje, North Macedonia, a village in the municipality of Jegunovce, North Macedonia
- Orašje Popovo, a village in the municipality of Trebinje, Republika Srpska, Bosnia and Herzegovina
- Orašje Površ, a village in the municipality of Trebinje, Republika Srpska, Bosnia and Herzegovina
- Orašje, Tuzla, a village in the municipality of Tuzla, Federation of Bosnia and Herzegovina, Bosnia and Herzegovina
- Orašje Zubci, a village in the municipality of Trebinje, Republika Srpska, Bosnia and Herzegovina
