= Vlasina (river) =

Vlasina (Власина)
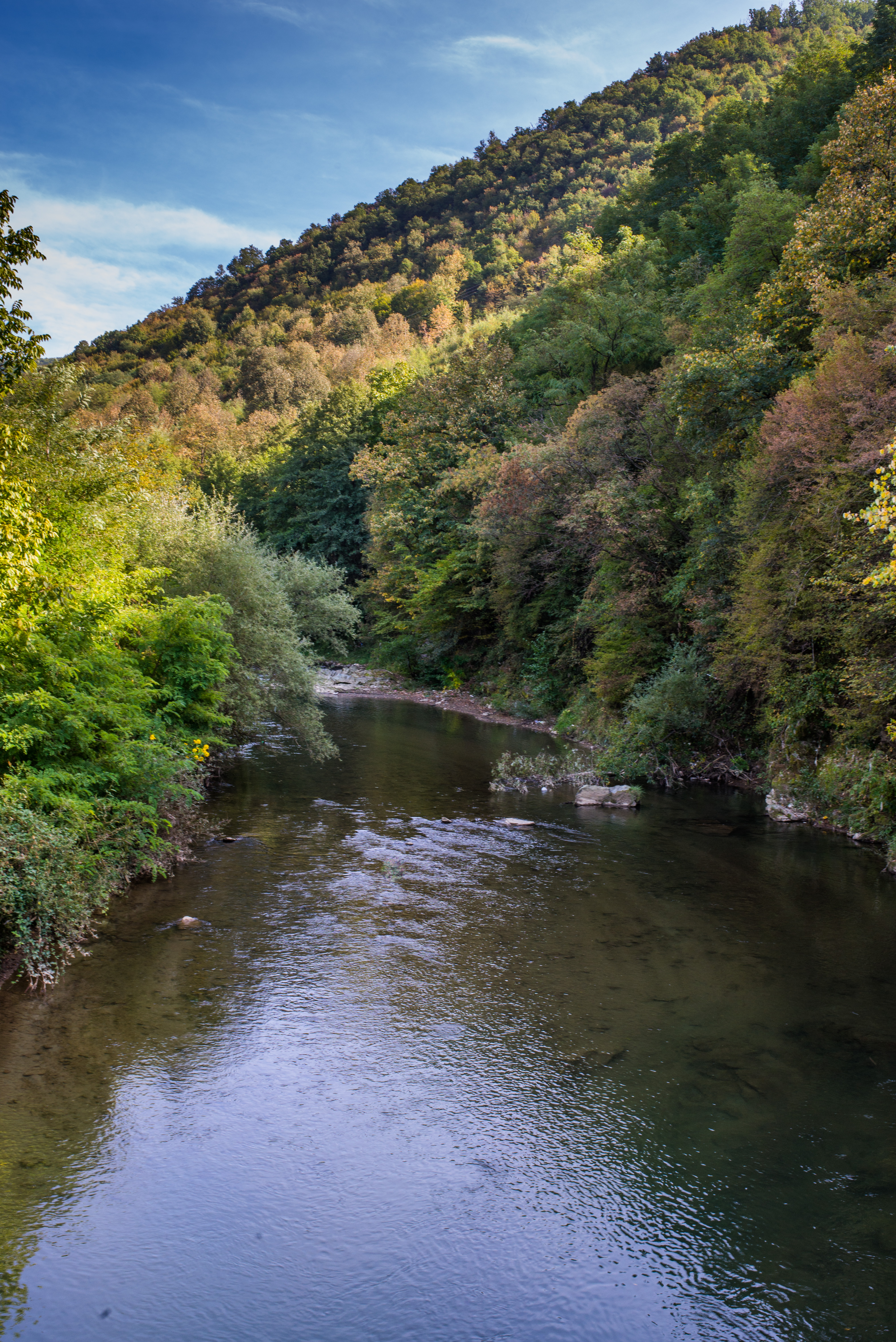
- River Vlasina

Location
- Country: Serbia

Physical characteristics
- Source
  - location: Vlasina Lake, southeastern Serbia
  - elevation: 1,213 m (3,980 ft)
- Mouth
  - location: Južna Morava, east of Leskovac, Serbia
  - coordinates: 42°59′54″N 22°01′44″E
- Length: 70 km (43 mi)
- Basin size: 991 km^{2} (383 sq mi)
- Discharge
  - average: 11 m^{3}/s (390 cu ft/s)

Basin features
- Progression: South Morava→ Great Morava→ Danube→ Black Sea

The Vlasina (Serbian Cyrillic: Власина) is a river in southeastern Serbia, a 70 km-long outflow of the Vlasina Lake and a right tributary to the South Morava, which also gives its name to the surrounding Vlasina region.

== Geography ==
The Vlasina flows out from the Vlasina Lake at an altitude of 1,213 m. Lake used to be a large, muddy peat bog, but in 1947-1951 the Vlasina was dammed by the long, earth dam and the bog was turned into an artificial lake. The river flows to the north, between the mountains of Čemernik on the west, and Gramada on the east. It flows through Crna Trava, regional and municipal center, and the villages of Brod, Krstićevo and Jabukovik, where it reaches the Lužnica mountain and receives the Gradska from the right.

The river bends to the west, along the southern slopes of Lužnica, and receives from the right the Tegošnica (at Donje Gare village) and the Lužnica (at Svođe). As the Vlasina continues on the southernmost slopes of the Suva Planina and Babička Gora mountains, it reaches the town of Vlasotince and western parts of the low Leskovac Field, part of the composite valley of the Južna Morava. After the villages of Batulovce and Stajkovce, the Vlasina empties into the South Morava, east of the Leskovac's eastern suburb of Mrštane.

The river's valley, from the Vlasina Lake to the town of Vlasotince is narrow, defile-like with steep sides prone to heavy erosion. Downstream from Vlasotince, the valley expands and the rivers starts to meander. Right before its confluence with the South Morava, the Vlasina branches into several arms, stretching for 400 metres (1,300 ft). During the high water levels, this entire confluence area is flooded.

The longest tributaries are Tegošnica (41 kilometres (25 mi)), Lužnica (38 kilometres (24 mi)), Pusta Reka (20 kilometres (12 mi)), Gradska Reka (17 kilometres (11 mi)), Bistrica (14 kilometres (8.7 mi)) and Rastovnica (11 kilometres (6.8 mi)). For the purpose of hydroelectricity production, some of the Vlasina's tributaries were rerouted through canals into the Vlasina Lake, thus making them part of the Vrla watershed. Those tributaries are Mlađenica, Čemernica and all the right tributaries to the Strvna river. This way, an artificial bifurcation and stream capture were formed.

The Vlasina drains an area of 991 square kilometres (383 sq mi). It belongs to the Black Sea drainage basin and it is not navigable.

== Characteristics ==
During the summer, large amounts of water from the river are used for irrigation of the surrounding arable land. Water is especially used in the lower course, known for the vegetable production.

There is a small dam in Vlasotince, close to downtown, with a reservoir and the beach.

By the 2020s, plans were made to build 55 mini hydros in the watershed of Vlasina. After the negative backlash which followed construction of mini hydros in other parts of Serbia, and action of the local environmentalists, the municipality of Vlasotince banned such facilities on its territory in March 2021.

== Floods ==
Usually a calm river, Vlasina is infamous for catastrophic, torrential flooding, which cause major damages. The entire watershed of the river is prone to the erosion. Especially hit are the sections between Crna Trava and Svođe, and between Svođe and Babušnica. The town of Vlasotince was flooded in 1948.

On 26 June 1988, after a period of heavy rains, Vlasina valley was a site of catastrophic floods. Extreme downpours and heavy storms affected river's watershed area in the municipalities of Vlasotince, Crna Trava, Babušnica, Pirot and Leskovac. Upper and central watershed sections received 100 to 200 litres per square metre (2.0 to 4.1 imp gal/sq ft) with an absolute peak in Rakov Dol, with 220 litres per square metre (4.5 imp gal/sq ft). This was absolute daily maximum in the entire Serbia. Instead of an average discharge of eleven cubic metres per second (390 cu ft/s), the Vlasina swelled 145 times, to 1,600 cubic metres per second (57,000 cu ft/s). Tidal wave was nine metres (30 ft) tall and, to make things worst, smashed the town during the night. Both the discharge and the height of the wave were never recorded previously. It was estimated that the river collected and carried over 230,000 tons of sediments in the 26–27 June period.

Military was dispatched to help the residents. In Vlasotince, 1,700 buildings were flooded, 120 were completely destroyed, so as 55 artisan shops, while all major companies and economic organizations were disabled. Numerous streets were washed away, so as 17 bridges along the river, town's bus station, power station and all generators, sports fields, post offices, city waterworks, overhead power lines and Vlasotince's famous "Park" garden. The Vlasotince-Crna Trava trunk road was cut off on 36 locations. Apart from Vlastince, huge damage stroke the villages of Dobroviš, Tegošnica, Gornji Orah, Svođe, Dejan, Kruševica, Boljare, Manastirište, Konopnica and Stajkovce. All crops were destroyed and the livestock population was decimated.

In total, the area affected by the catastrophe covered more than 1,000 square kilometres (390 sq mi), and caused a damage of around US$1 billion (or 355 billion of current Yugoslav dinars), despite the river flow being supposedly regulated. Subsequent analysis showed a number of flaws in the design of the protected catchment. In the next period, a solidarity settlement was built in Vlasotince and new bridges were constructed in the villages Manastirište, Tegošnica, Stajkovac, Ravni Dol and Donji Dejan. A book commemorating the event, Događaj za zaborav i nezaborav (Event for oblivion and remembrance) was published by Dragoljub Stanojević.

The Vlasina again flooded its valley in 2008. During the floods in January 2021, the army was again deployed. Severe rains and ensuing floods caused power outage in the entire municipality of Vlasotince and cut the supply of the drinking water. The river also brought large amount of garbage which clogged the small dam in town.

== Sources ==
- Jovan Đ. Marković (1990): Enciklopedijski geografski leksikon Jugoslavije; Svjetlost-Sarajevo; ISBN 86-01-02651-6
- Gavrilovic, Zoran; Matovic, Zivorad (January 1991). "Review of disastrous torrent flood on the vlasina river on June 26, 1988 — Including analysis of flood and the obtained results". In Armanini, Aronne; Silvio, Giampaolo (eds.). Fluvial Hydraulics of Mountain Regions. Lecture Notes in Earth Sciences. Vol. 37. pp. 235–250. Bibcode:1991LNES...37..235G. doi:10.1007/BFb0011194. ISBN 978-3-540-54491-3.
