= Gornja Lomnica =

Gornja Lomnica may refer to:

- Gornja Lomnica (Vlasotince), village in municipality of Vlasotince, Serbia
- Gornja Lomnica, Croatia, village near Velika Gorica, Croatia
