= Šišava (Vlasotince) =

Šišave
- Village
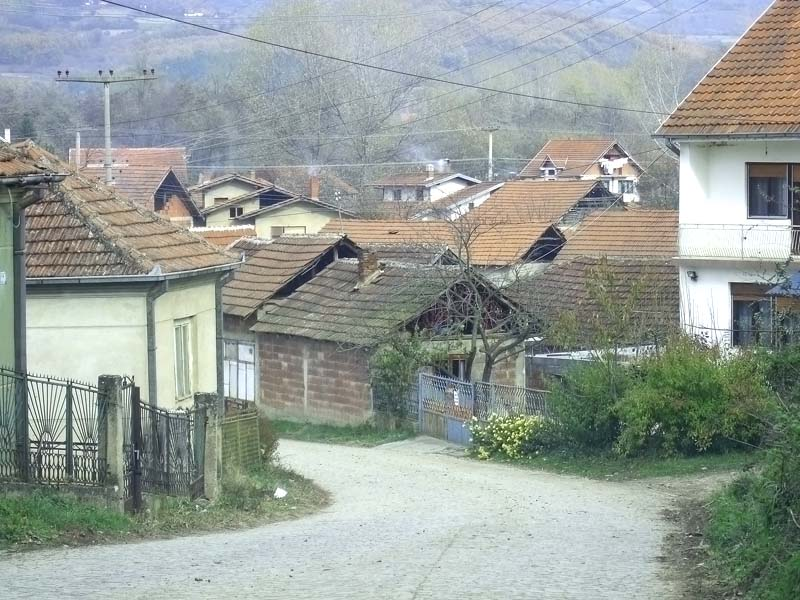
- Street of Šišave

- Location within Serbia
- Coordinates: 42.9857815°N 22.1076679°E
- Country: Serbia
- District: Jablanica District
- Municipality: Vlasotince

Population (2002)
  - Total: 1,125
- Time zone: UTC+1 (CET)
  - Summer (DST): UTC+2 (CEST)

Šišava is a village in the municipality of Vlasotince, Serbia. According to the 2002 census, the village has a population of 1125 people.

== Literature ==
- Stamenković, Velimir (2003). Šišava i Šišavci [Šišava and Šišavians] (in Serbian). Vlasotince: Kulturni centar; Informativni list Vlasina. ISBN 86-83805-14-X. COBISS.SR 108229132.
