= Gložane =

Gložane may refer to:

- Gložane (Svilajnac), a village in Serbia
- Gložane (Vlasotince), a village in Serbia
