= Crnatovo, Vlasotince =

Crnatovo Црнатово (Serbian)
- Village
- Location within Serbia
- Coordinates: 42°59′43″N 22°09′12″E
- Country: Serbia
- District: Jablanica District
- Municipality: Vlasotince

Population (2002)
  - Total: 176
- Time zone: UTC+1 (CET)
  - Summer (DST): UTC+2 (CEST)

Crnatovo is a village in the municipality of Vlasotince, Serbia. According to the 2002 census, the village has a population of 176 people.
