= Sredor =

Sredor Средор (Serbian)
- Village
- Location within Serbia
- Coordinates: 43°00′N 22°07′E
- Country: Serbia
- District: Jablanica District
- Municipality: Vlasotince
- Elevation: 504 m (1,654 ft)

Population (2011)
  - Total: 201
- Time zone: UTC+1 (CET)
  - Summer (DST): UTC+2 (CEST)

Sredor is a village in the municipality of Vlasotince, Serbia. According to the 2011 census, the village has a population of 201 people.
