= Borin Do =

Borin Do Борин До (Serbian)
- Village
- Location within Serbia
- Country: Serbia
- District: Jablanica District
- Municipality: Vlasotince

Population (2002)
  - Total: 148
- Time zone: UTC+1 (CET)
  - Summer (DST): UTC+2 (CEST)

Borin Do is a village in the municipality of Vlasotince, Serbia. According to the 2002 census, the village has a population of 148 people.
