= Jastrebac (Vlasotince) =

Jastrebac Јастребац (Serbian)
- Village
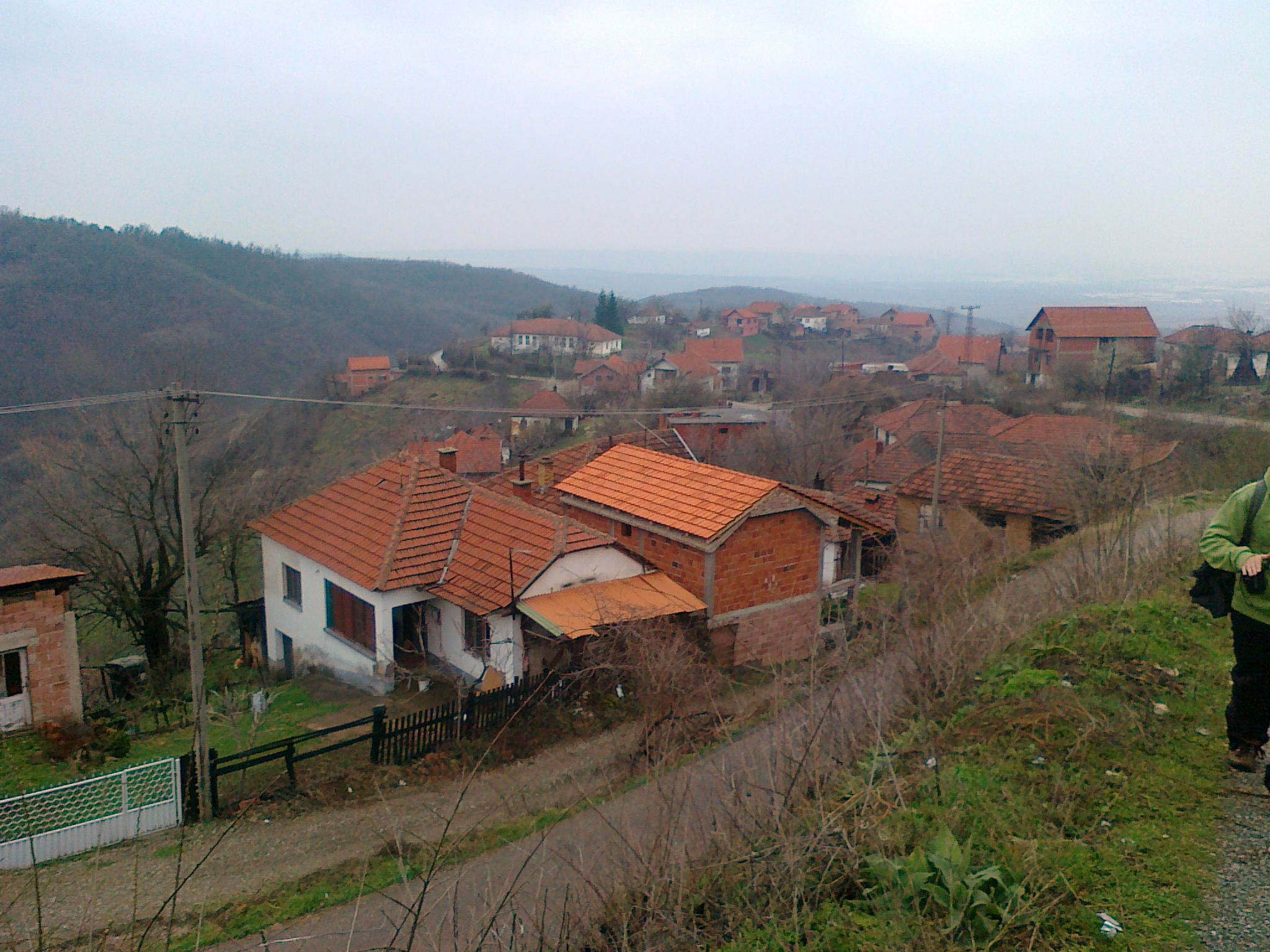

- Location within Serbia
- Coordinates: 42°56′47″N 22°08′31″E
- Country: Serbia
- District: Jablanica District
- Municipality: Vlasotince

Population (2002)
  - Total: 423
- Time zone: UTC+1 (CET)
  - Summer (DST): UTC+2 (CEST)

Jastrebac is a village in the municipality of Vlasotince, Serbia. According to the 2002 census, the village has a population of 423 people.
