= Komarica =

Komarica Комарица (Serbian)
- Village
- Location within Serbia
- Coordinates: 43°3′53″N 22°9′9″E
- Country: Serbia
- Entity: Jablanica District
- Municipality: Vlasotince

Population (2002)
  - Total: 198
- Time zone: UTC+1 (CET)
  - Summer (DST): UTC+2 (CEST)

Komarica is a village in the municipality of Vlasotince, Serbia. According to the 2002 census, the village has a population of 198 people.
