= Prilepac =

Prilepac Прилепац (Serbian)
- Village
- Location within Serbia
- Coordinates: 42°57′N 22°02′E
- Country: Serbia
- District: Jablanica District
- Municipality: Vlasotince

Population (2022)
  - Total: 375
- Time zone: UTC+1 (CET)
  - Summer (DST): UTC+2 (CEST)

Prilepac (Serbian Cyrillic: Прилепац) is a village in the municipality of Vlasotince, Serbia. According to the 2022 census, the village has a population of 375 people.
