= Konopnica (Vlasotince) =

Konopnica Конопница (Serbian)
- Village
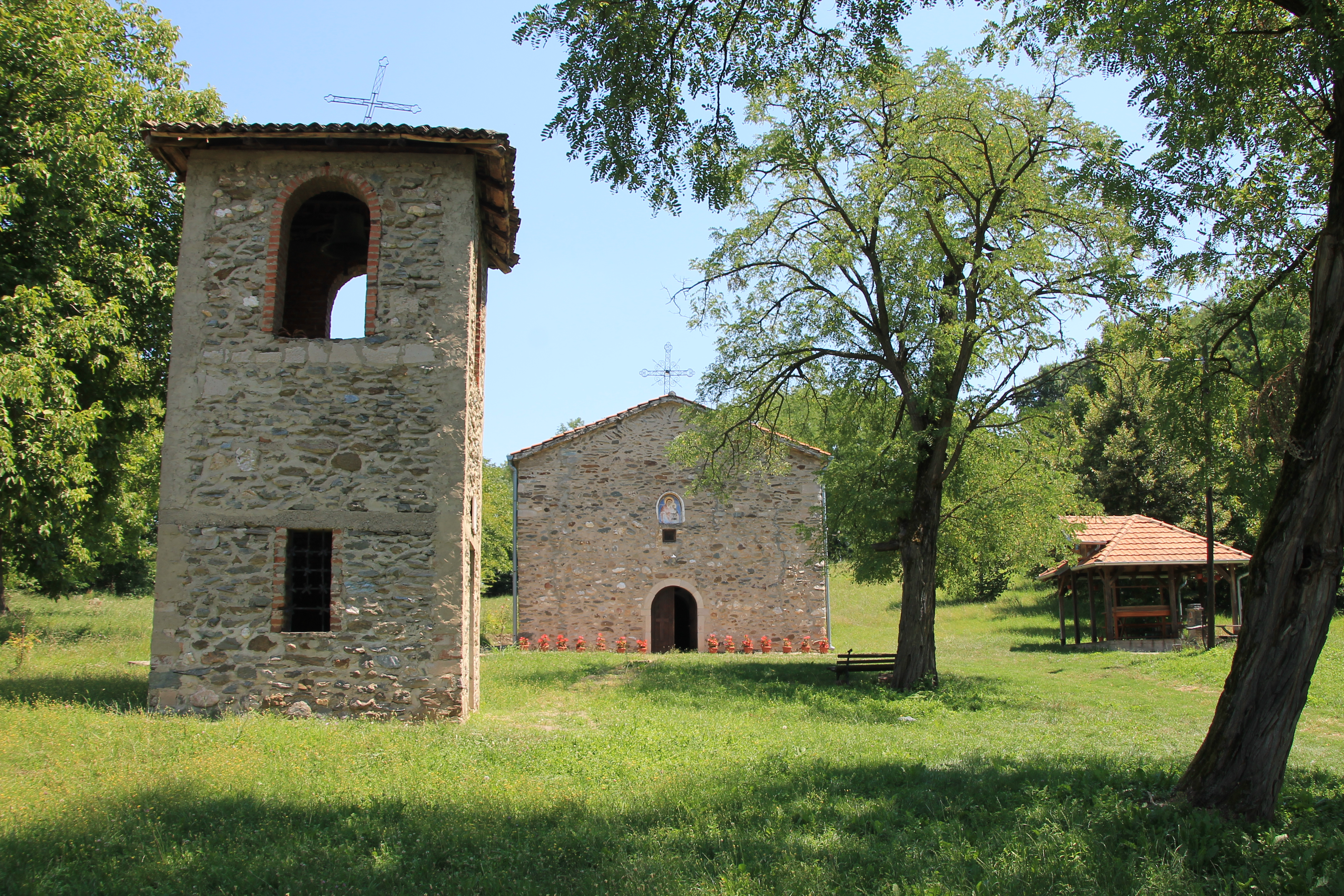

- Location within Serbia
- Coordinates: 42.983208°N 22.096549°E
- Country: Serbia
- District: Jablanica District
- Municipality: Vlasotince

Population (2022)
  - Total: 685
- Time zone: UTC+1 (CET)
  - Summer (DST): UTC+2 (CEST)

Konopnica is a village in the municipality of Vlasotince, Serbia. According to the 2002 census, the village has a population of 989 people.
