= Javorje, Vlasotince =

Javorje Јаворје (Serbian)
- Village
- Location within Serbia
- Coordinates: 42°56′09″N 22°14′56″E
- Country: Serbia
- Region: Southern and Eastern Serbia
- District: Jablanica
- Municipality: Vlasotince
- Elevation: 3,468 ft (1,057 m)

Population (2011)
  - Total: 1
- Time zone: UTC+1 (CET)
  - Summer (DST): UTC+2 (CEST)

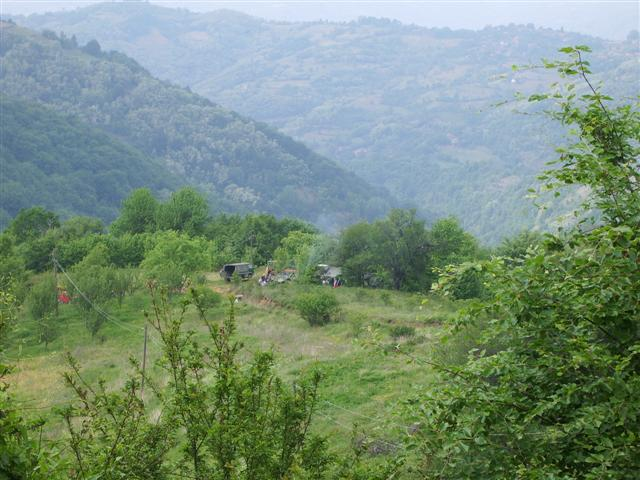
Landscapte near Javorje, municipality of Vlasotince, Serbia

Javorje is a village in the municipality of Vlasotince, Serbia. According to the 2011 census, the village is populated by one person.

== Population ==
Population of Javorje
1948	1953	1961	1971	1981	1991	2002	2011
185	175	182	171	26	14	1	1
