= Ravna Gora (Vlasotince) =

Ravna Gora Равна Гора (Serbian)
- Village
- Location within Serbia
- Coordinates: 42°55′42″N 22°11′46″E
- Country: Serbia
- District: Jablanica District
- Municipality: Vlasotince

Population (2002)
  - Total: 151
- Time zone: UTC+1 (CET)
  - Summer (DST): UTC+2 (CEST)

Ravna Gora is a village in the municipality of Vlasotince, Serbia. According to the 2002 census, the village has a population of 151 people.
