= Vlasotince =

Vlasotince Власотинце (Serbian)
- Town and municipality
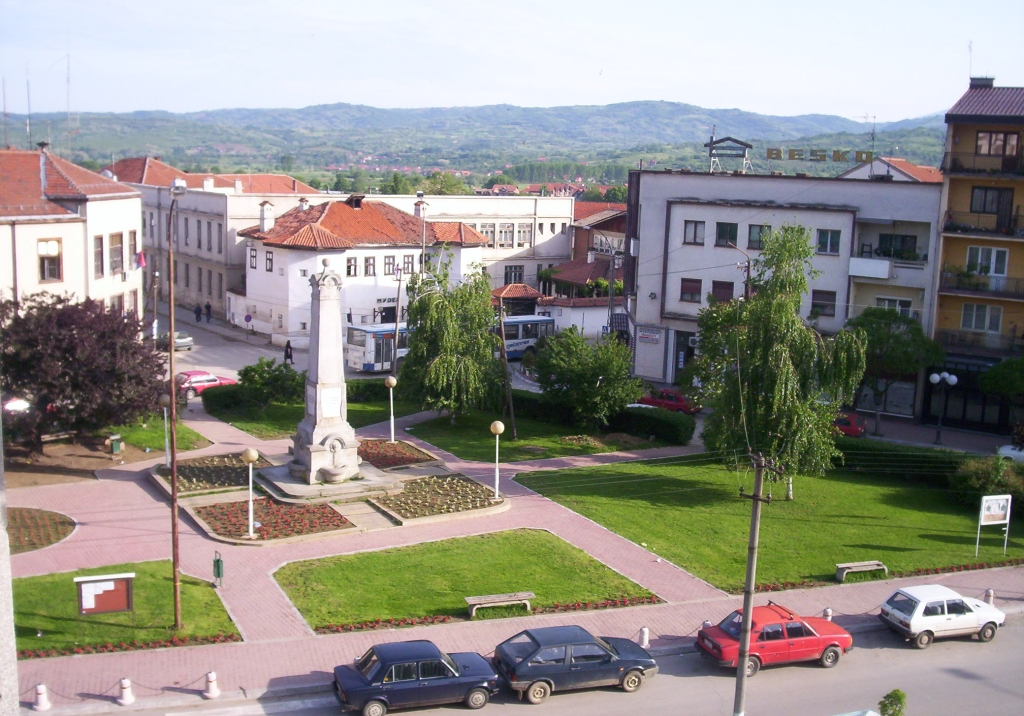
- Vlasotince, town centre

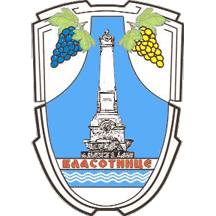
- Coat of arms

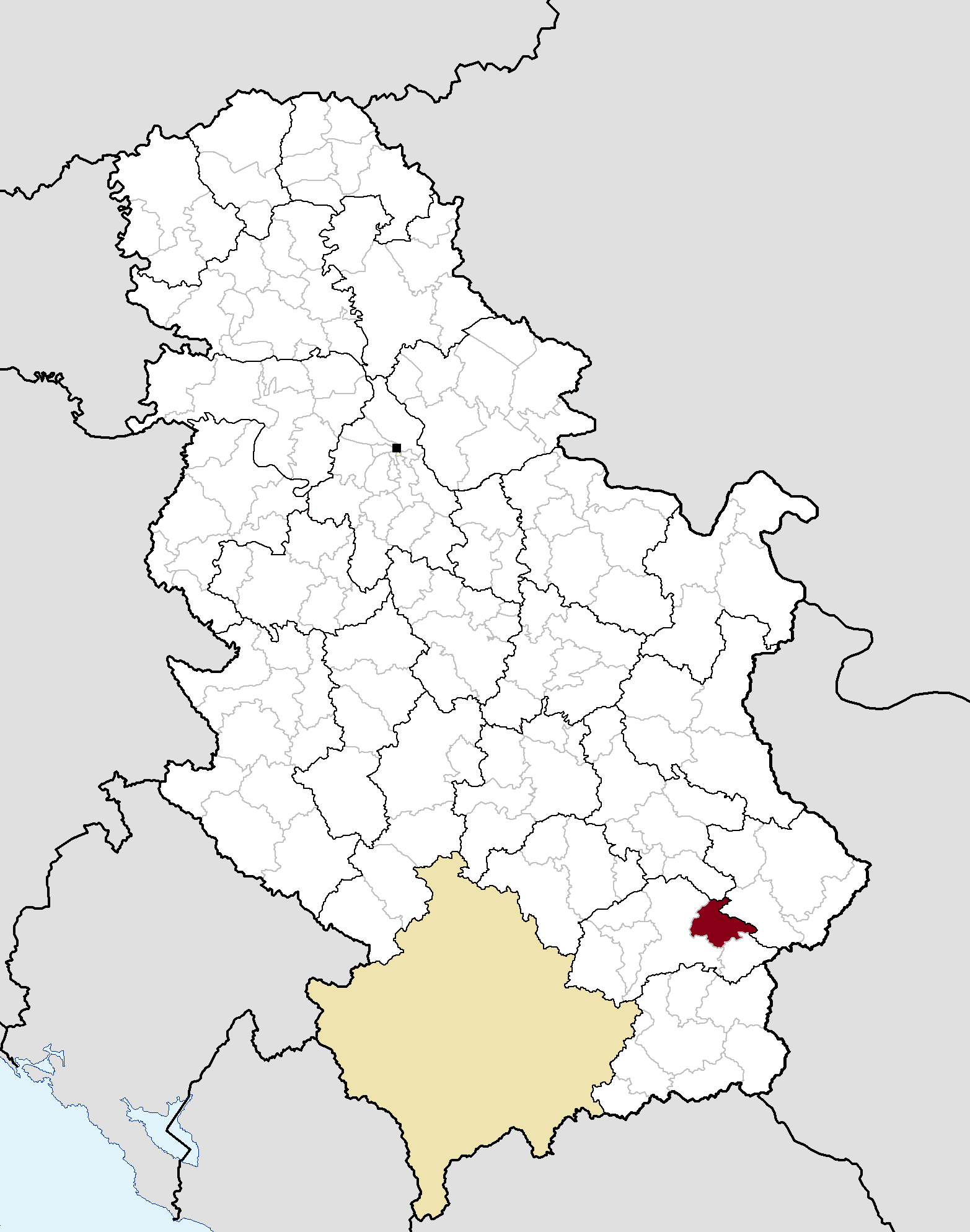
- Location of the municipality of Vlasotince within Serbia
- Coordinates: 42°58′N 22°08′E
- Country: Serbia
- Region: Southern and Eastern Serbia
- District: Jablanica
- Settlements: 48

Government
  - Mayor: Zoran Todorović (SNS)

Area
  - Town: 15.91 km^{2} (6.14 sq mi)
  - Municipality: 308 km^{2} (119 sq mi)
- Elevation: 234 m (768 ft)

Population (2022 census)
  - Town: 14,924
  - Town density: 938.0/km^{2} (2,429/sq mi)
  - Municipality: 25,695
  - Municipality density: 83.4/km^{2} (216/sq mi)
- Time zone: UTC+1 (CET)
  - Summer (DST): UTC+2 (CEST)
- Postal code: 16210
- Area code: +381(0)16
- Car plates: VL
- Website: vlasotince.rs

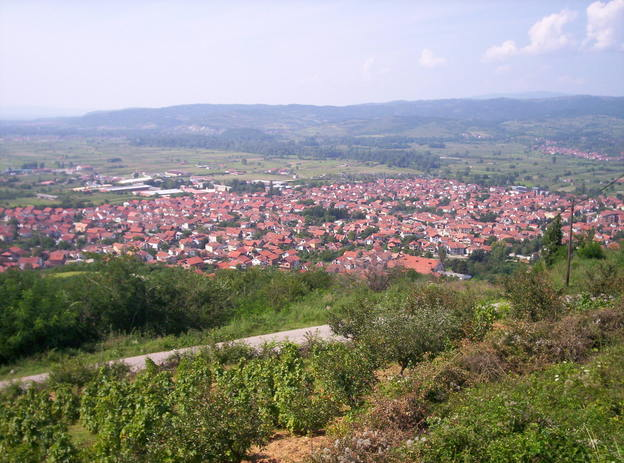
Panoramic view on Vlasotince

Vlasotince (Serbian Cyrillic: Власотинце) is a town and municipality located in Jablanica District of southern Serbia. As of 2022, the municipality has 25,695 inhabitants, while the town itself has a population of 14,924 inhabitants.

== History ==
According to Turkish records, the town existed in the 15th century as a Turkish administrative center. After the Turks were forced out of Serbia, locals started growing wine grapes as a kind of complementary business to their building activities. They made Vlasotince the number one wine region in the former Yugoslavia and furthermore the biggest wine exporter in the Balkans. The craftsmanship and building skills of workers and builders from this region were appreciated in the former Yugoslavia and its surrounding neighbours until the Yugoslav Wars.

On 26 June 1988, after a period of heavy rains, Vlasina valley was a site of catastrophic floods. Extreme downpours and heavy storms affected river's watershed area in the municipalities of Vlasotince, Crna Trava, Babušnica, Pirot and Leskovac. Military was dispatched to help the residents. In Vlasotince, 1,700 buildings were flooded, 120 were completely destroyed, so as 55 artisan shops, while all major companies and economic organizations were disabled. Numerous streets were washed away, so as 17 bridges along the river, town's bus station, power station and all generators, sports fields, post offices, city waterworks, overhead power lines and Vlasotince's famous "Park" garden. In the next period, a solidarity settlement was built in Vlasotince.

During the floods in January 2021, the army was again deployed. Severe rains and ensuing floods caused power outage in the entire municipality of Vlasotince and cut the supply of the drinking water. The river also brought large amount of garbage which clogged the small dam in town.

== Settlements ==
Aside from the town of Vlasotince, the municipality includes the following settlements:

- Aleksine
- Batulovce
- Boljare
- Borin Do
- Brezovica
- Gložane
- Gornja Lomnica
- Gornja Lopušnja
- Gornji Dejan
- Gornji Orah
- Gornji Prisjan
- Gradište
- Gunjetina
- Dadince
- Dobroviš
- Donja Lomnica
- Donja Lopušnja
- Donje Gare
- Donji Dejan
- Donji Prisjan
- Zlatićevo
- Javorje
- Jakovljevo
- Jastrebac
- Kozilo
- Komarica
- Konopnica
- Kruševica
- Kukavica
- Ladovica
- Lipovica
- Orašje 728 citizens
- Ostrc
- Pržojne
- Prilepac
- Ravna Gora
- Ravni Del
- Samarnica
- Svođe
- Skrapež
- Sredor
- Stajkovce 1.463 citizens
- Stranjevo
- Tegošnica
- Crna Bara
- Crnatovo
- Šišava 949 citizens

According to 2022 census, the largest and the only settlement over a thousand citizens is Stajkovce (1.463).

== Demographics ==
Historical population
Year	Pop.	±% p.a.
1948	33,845	—
1953	35,224	+0.80%
1961	35,625	+0.14%
1971	36,022	+0.11%
1981	35,863	−0.04%
1991	34,302	−0.44%
2002	33,312	−0.27%
2011	29,893	−1.20%

According to the 2011 census results, the municipality of Vlasotince has a population of 29,893 inhabitants.

=== Ethnic groups ===
The ethnic composition of the municipality:

Ethnic group	Population	%
Serbs	28,613	97.54%
Romani	691	2.36%
Romanians	10	0.03%
Bulgarians	5	0.02%
Gorani	3	0.01%
Russians	2	0.01%
Others	12	0.04%
Total	29,893	

== Economy ==
The following table gives a preview of total number of registered people employed in legal entities per their core activity (as of 2018):

Activity	Total
Agriculture, forestry and fishing	46
Mining and quarrying	34
Manufacturing	2,446
Electricity, gas, steam and air conditioning supply	23
Water supply; sewerage, waste management and remediation activities	131
Construction	780
Wholesale and retail trade, repair of motor vehicles and motorcycles	810
Transportation and storage	119
Accommodation and food services	194
Information and communication	19
Financial and insurance activities	33
Real estate activities	2
Professional, scientific and technical activities	152
Administrative and support service activities	48
Public administration and defense; compulsory social security	272
Education	452
Human health and social work activities	351
Arts, entertainment and recreation	87
Other service activities	95
Individual agricultural workers	334
Total	6,429

== Sports ==
Local football club Vlasina has competed in the Yugoslav Second League and Second League of Serbia and Montenegro.

== Notable people ==
- Bogoljub Mitić Đoša, actor and comedian
- Nenad Filipović, athletics
- Predrag Filipović, athletics
- Slaviša Stojanović, football coach

== See also ==
- Subdivisions of Serbia
