= Zlatićevo =

Zlatićevo Златићево (Serbian)
- Village
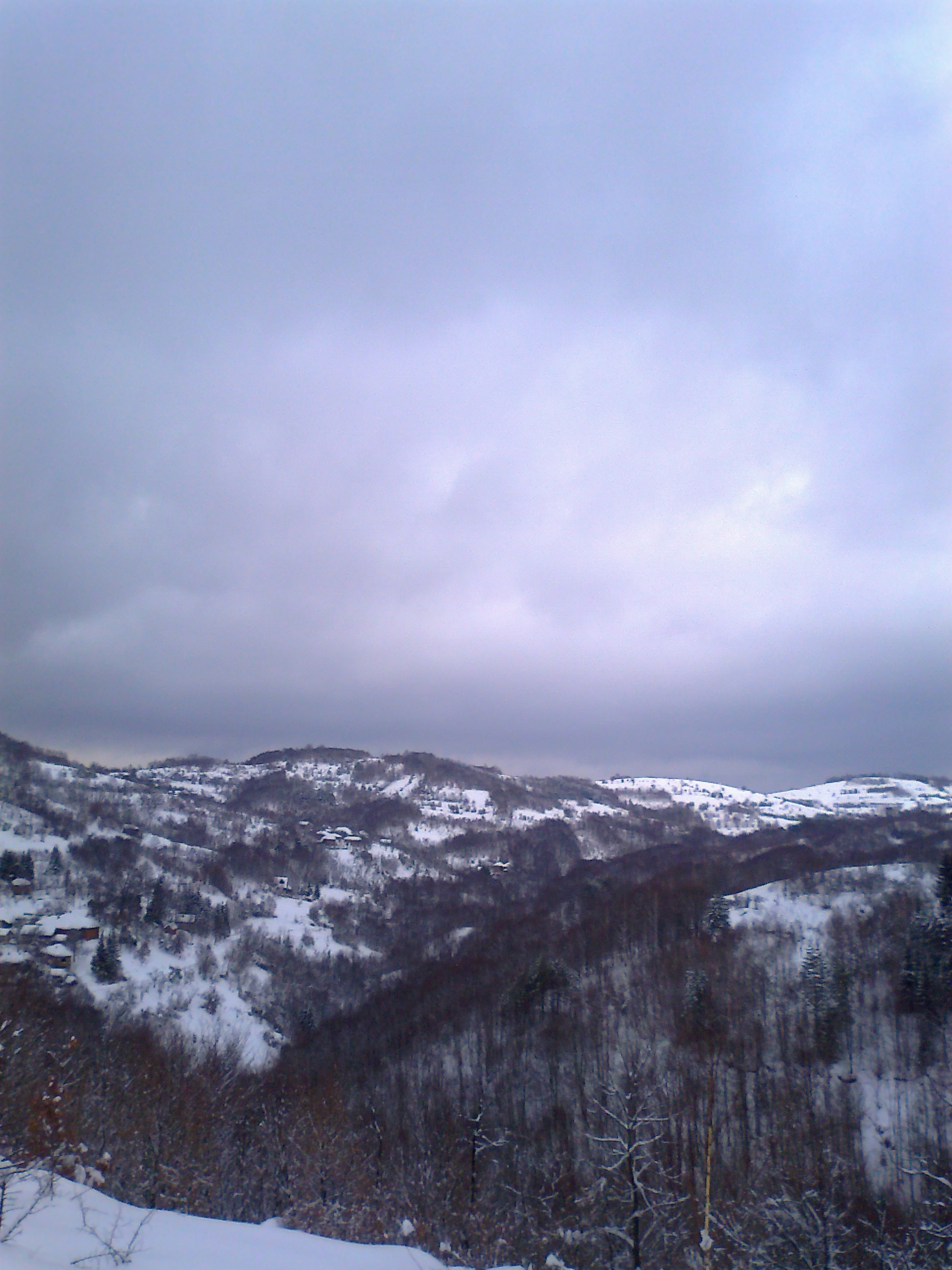

- Location within Serbia
- Coordinates: 42°57′37″N 22°15′32″E
- Country: Serbia
- District: Jablanica District
- Municipality: Vlasotince

Population (2002)
  - Total: 200
- Time zone: UTC+1 (CET)
  - Summer (DST): UTC+2 (CEST)

Zlatićevo is a village in the municipality of Vlasotince, Serbia. According to the 2002 census, the village has a population of 200 people.
