= Kozilo =

Kozilo Козило (Serbian)
- Village
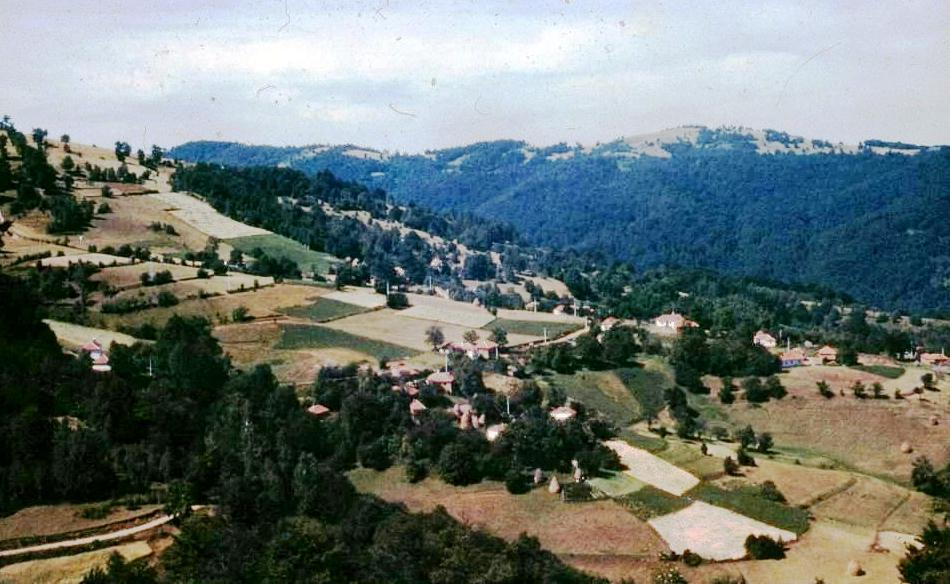

- Location within Serbia
- Coordinates: 42°55′12″N 22°14′44″E
- Country: Serbia
- District: Jablanica District
- Municipality: Vlasotince

Population (2002)
  - Total: 8
- Time zone: UTC+1 (CET)
  - Summer (DST): UTC+2 (CEST)

Kozilo is a village in the municipality of Vlasotince, Serbia. According to the 2002 census, the village has a population of 8 people.
