= Boljare =

Village in Vlasotince, Serbia

Boljare Бољаре (Serbian)
- Village
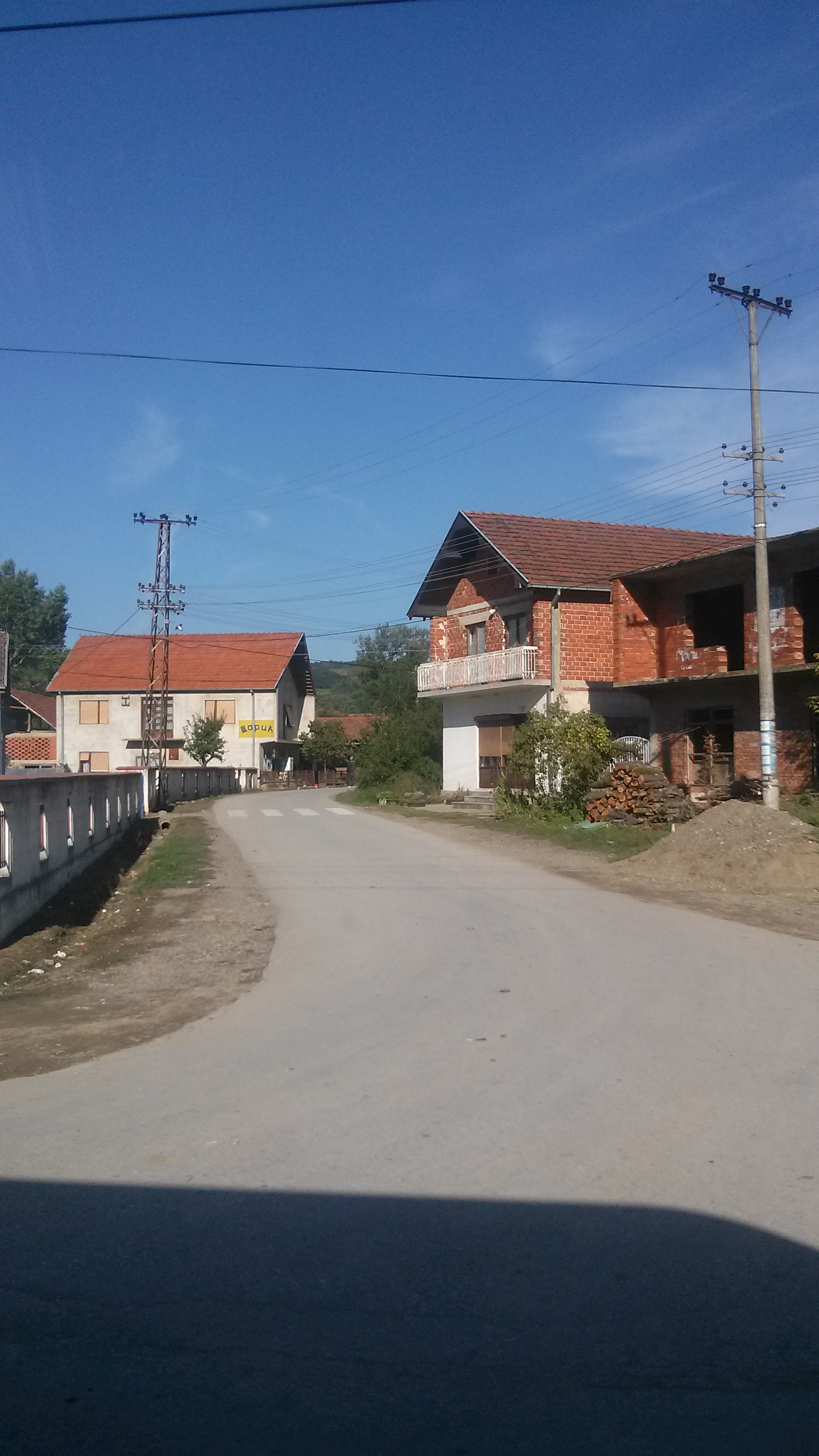

- Location within Serbia
- Coordinates: 42°58′28″N 22°09′44″E
- Country: Serbia
- District: Jablanica District
- Municipality: Vlasotince

Population (2002)
  - Total: 983
- Time zone: UTC+1 (CET)
  - Summer (DST): UTC+2 (CEST)

Boljare (Serbian Cyrillic: Бољаре) is a village in the municipality of Vlasotince, Serbia. According to the 2002 census, the village has a population of 983 people.
