= Kukavica (Vlasotince) =

Kukavica Кукавица (Serbian)
- Village
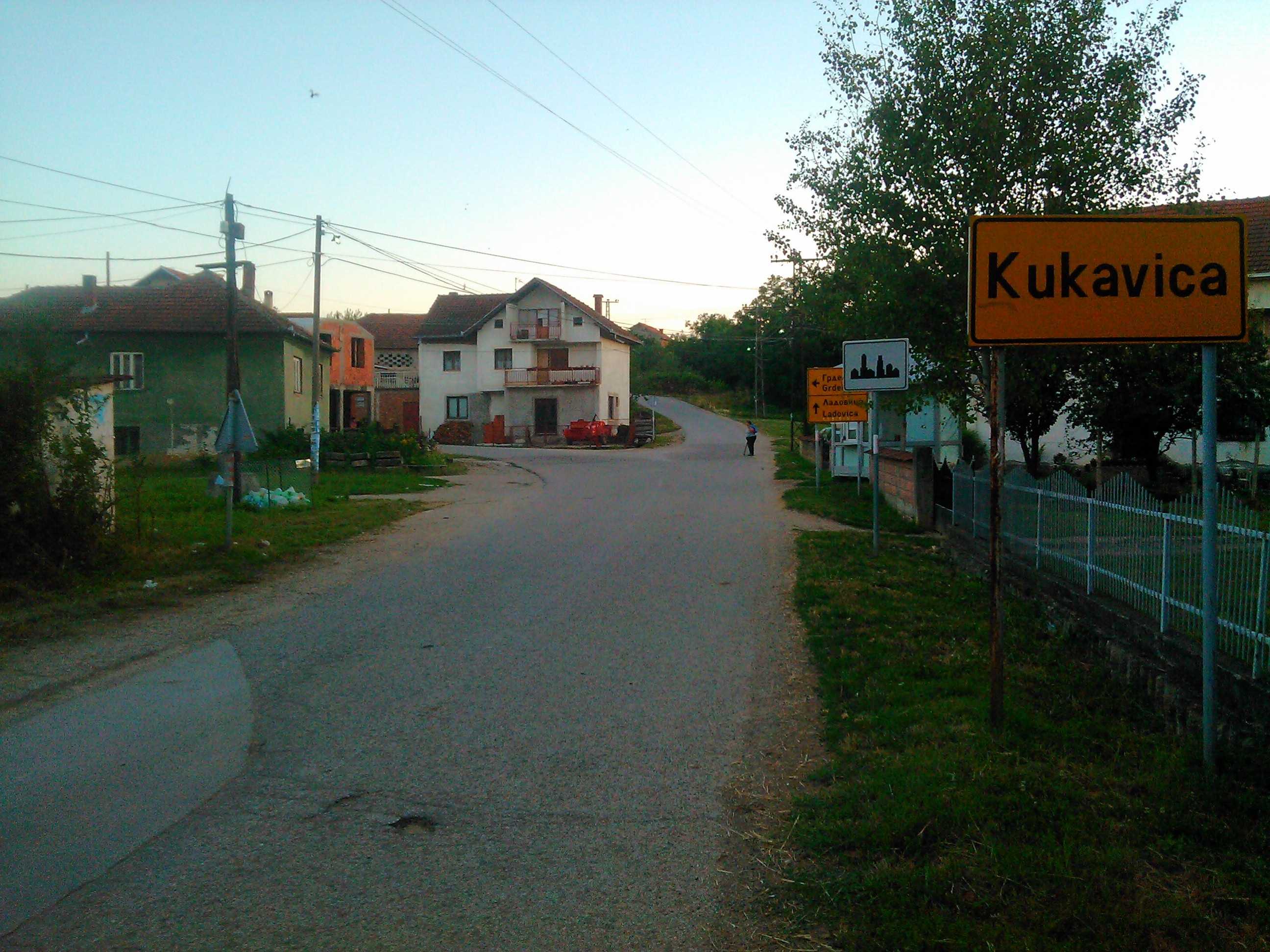
- Kukavica entrance sign, 2016

- Location within Serbia
- Coordinates: 42°56′42″N 22°05′13″E
- Country: Serbia
- District: Jablanica District
- Municipality: Vlasotince

Population (2002)
  - Total: 535
- Time zone: UTC+1 (CET)
  - Summer (DST): UTC+2 (CEST)

Kukavica is a village in the municipality of Vlasotince, Serbia. According to the 2002 census, the village has a population of 535 people.
