= Slaviša Stojanović (footballer, born 1969) =

Slovenian football manager (born 1969)

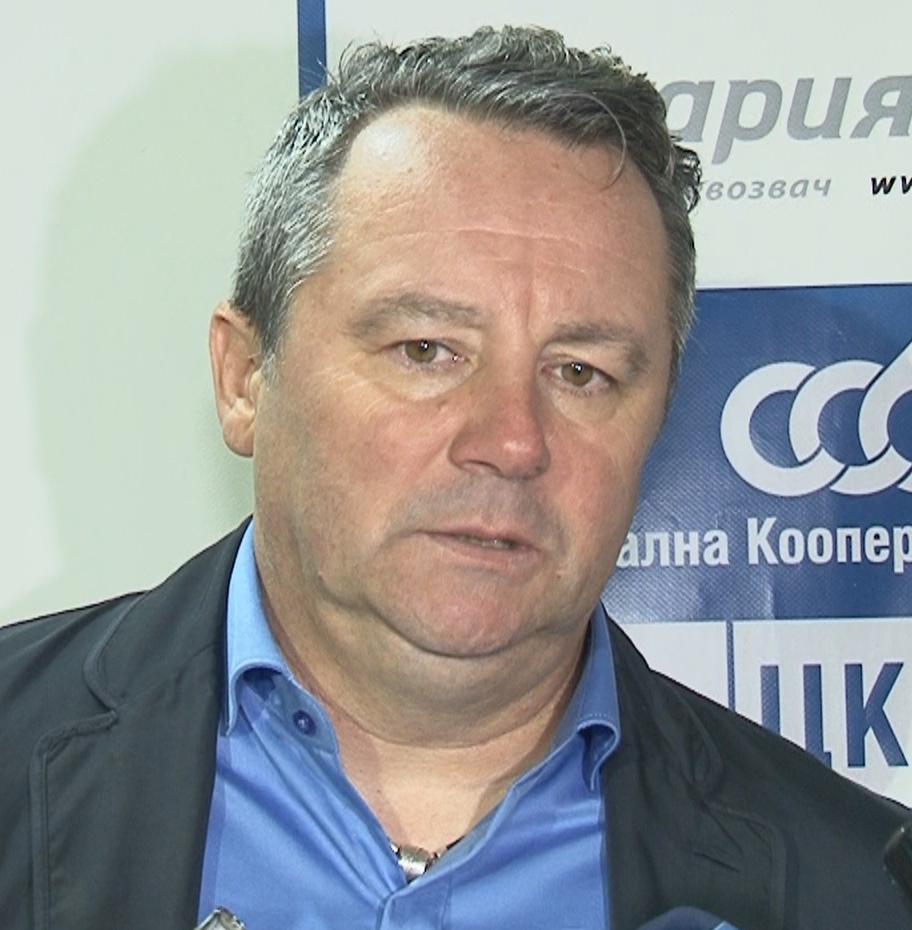
- Stojanović in 2018

Personal information
- Date of birth: 6 December 1969 (age 56)
- Place of birth: Gornji Dejan, SR Serbia, SFR Yugoslavia
- Position: Defender

Senior career*
Years	Team	Apps	(Gls)
1989–1994	Slovan		
1994–1995	Ljubljana		
1996	Celje		
1996–1997	Ljubljana		
1997–1998	Vevče		
2000–2001	Livar		

Managerial career
- 2001–2002: Livar
- 2002–2008: Domžale
- 2008–2009: Celje
- 2011–2012: Slovenia
- 2013–2014: Red Star Belgrade
- 2014–2015: Lierse
- 2016: Changchun Yatai
- 2017: Riga
- 2018–2019: Levski Sofia
- 2019–2020: Latvia
- 2020–2021: Levski Sofia
- 2025: Koper
- 2025–2026: Željezničar
- * Club domestic league appearances and goals

Slaviša Stojanović (born 6 December 1969) is a Slovenian professional football manager and former player. As a manager, he has won the Slovenian PrvaLiga twice, with Domžale, and the Serbian SuperLiga once, with Red Star Belgrade.

== Managerial career ==
=== Early career ===
Stojanović started his managerial career with the youth selections of Slovan. In 2001, he became the manager of the Slovenian Second League side Livar.

=== Domžale ===
Stojanović was appointed manager of Domžale in 2002. In his first year in charge, Domžale were promoted to the national top division, the Slovenian PrvaLiga. In 2006–07 and 2007–08, Stojanović won back-to-back national titles with the team.

=== UAE national team ===
In June 2009, Stojanović was appointed as an assistant manager of Srečko Katanec at the United Arab Emirates national team. In September 2011, he and Katanec were both sacked after two successive defeats to Kuwait and South Korea in the 2014 FIFA World Cup qualifiers.

=== Slovenia national team ===
On 24 October 2011, Stojanović became the new manager of the Slovenia national team after the Football Association of Slovenia terminated their contract with Matjaž Kek by mutual agreement earlier that day. On 9 December 2012, he resigned as the manager of the Slovenia national team after winning just three points in their first four opening games of the 2014 FIFA World Cup qualifiers.

=== Red Star Belgrade ===
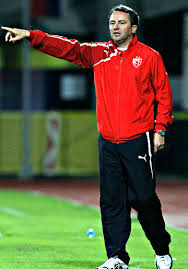
Stojanović managing Red Star Belgrade in 2013

On 24 June 2013, Stojanović replaced Ricardo Sá Pinto as a manager of Red Star Belgrade. He opened the league season with a 4–2 loss to Javor Ivanjica. Despite a mixed start to the season, winning five of their first ten games, Red Star managed to win 15 games in a row and ultimately won the Serbian SuperLiga for the first time in seven years.

=== Lierse ===
On 5 September 2014, Stojanović succeeded Stanley Menzo as a manager of Belgian side Lierse. Signing a contract until the end of the season, Stojanović eventually resigned amidst a relegation battle in January 2015.

=== Changchun Yatai ===
On 13 January 2016, Stojanović was appointed manager of Changchun Yatai. However, his reign was short-lived, with Stojanović getting fired on 4 May 2016. He was replaced by former Beijing Guoan and Guangzhou Evergrande manager Lee Jang-soo.

=== Levski Sofia ===
After a spell with Latvian side Riga, Stojanović became manager of Levski Sofia on 30 July 2018, signing a two-year contract with the Bulgarian giants. The term was short-lived, as he was released by the club on 21 January 2019, amid reports of an upcoming move to become head coach of the Latvia national team.

=== Latvia national team ===
On 1 March 2019, Stojanović was confirmed as the new head coach of the Latvia national team. He was sacked in January 2020 after losing nine out of ten matches in the UEFA Euro 2020 qualifiers.

=== Return to Levski ===
In November 2020, Stojanović returned to Levski. Alongside the managerial role, he also became the new director of football at the club. In March 2021, Stojanović tested positive for COVID-19 and was later hospitalized. He was absent from Levski's bench until the end of the season. On 20 May 2021, Levski issued a statement declaring Stojanović's contract with the club would not be prolonged beyond the 2020–21 season.

=== Koper ===
Stojanović returned to manage in Slovenia in March 2025, taking charge of Koper. He led the side to a third-place league finish, securing a place in the 2025–26 UEFA Conference League qualifiers. Koper also reached the 2024–25 Slovenian Cup final, but lost to Celje. Starting the 2025–26 season in the UEFA Conference League qualifiers, Koper reached the second qualifying round before getting eliminated by Viking 12–3 on aggregate.

After a series of poor results, including an early Slovenian Cup exit against second-tier side Tabor Sežana, Stojanović was sacked in October 2025.

=== Željezničar ===
On 29 December 2025, Stojanović was announced as the new manager of Bosnian Premier League side Željezničar. His first competitive game in charge of Željezničar ended in a 1–0 away loss to Posušje on 8 February 2026. Four days later, Stojanović secured his first win as Željezničar manager against Slavija Sarajevo in the Bosnian Cup to proceed to the quarter-finals. Following two more league defeats and lackluster performances, Željezničar announced on 22 February that Stojanović had left the club by mutual consent after managing only four games.

== Managerial statistics ==
As of match played 21 February 2026

Managerial record by team and tenure
Team	From	To	Record				
Team	From	To	G	W	D	L	Win %
Domžale	1 July 2002	17 June 2008	229	125	59	45	54.59
Celje	18 June 2008	17 June 2009	37	15	8	14	40.54
Slovenia	24 October 2011	9 December 2012	9	2	2	5	22.22
Red Star Belgrade	24 June 2013	30 June 2014	37	26	5	6	70.27
Lierse	5 September 2014	28 January 2015	19	3	5	11	15.79
Changchun Yatai	13 January 2016	4 May 2016	7	0	2	5	0.00
Riga	30 July 2017	31 December 2017	14	7	2	5	50.00
Levski Sofia	30 July 2018	21 January 2019	20	13	1	6	65.00
Latvia	1 March 2019	19 January 2020	10	1	0	9	10.00
Levski Sofia	10 November 2020	23 May 2021	13	5	4	4	38.46
Koper	19 March 2025	7 October 2025	30	15	8	7	50.00
Željezničar	29 December 2025	22 February 2026	4	1	0	3	25.00
Total			429	213	96	120	49.65

== Honours ==
=== Manager ===
Domžale

- Slovenian PrvaLiga: 2006–07, 2007–08
- Slovenian Second League: 2002–03
- Slovenian Supercup: 2007

Red Star Belgrade

- Serbian SuperLiga: 2013–14
