= Gornji Prisjan =

Gornji Prisjan Горњи Присјан (Serbian)
- Village
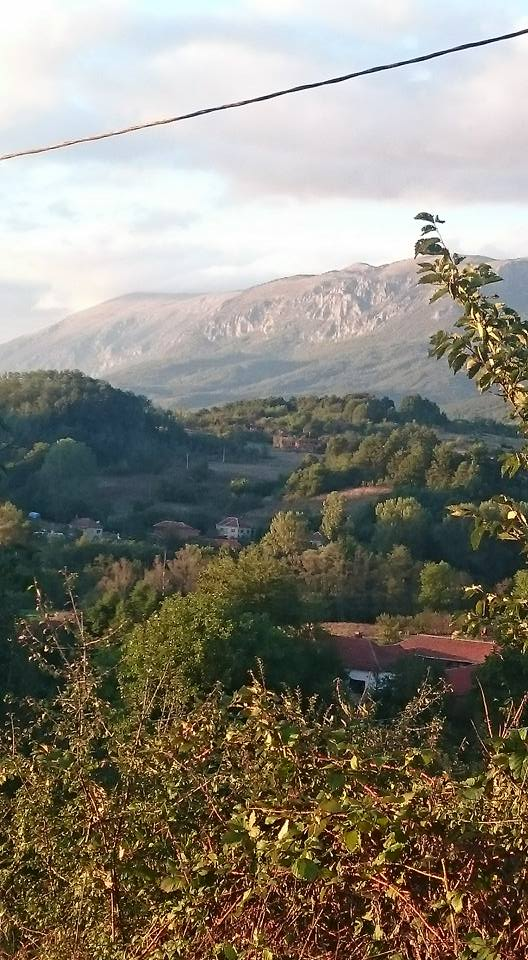

- Location within Serbia
- Coordinates: 43°03′44″N 22°13′34″E
- Country: Serbia
- District: Jablanica District
- Municipality: Vlasotince

Population (2002)
  - Total: 270
- Time zone: UTC+1 (CET)
  - Summer (DST): UTC+2 (CEST)

Gornji Prisjan is a village in the municipality of Vlasotince, Serbia. According to the 2012 census, the village has a population of 335 people.
