= Donje Gare =

Donje Gare Доње Гаре (Serbian)
- Village
- Location within Serbia
- Coordinates: 42°56′24″N 22°17′45″E
- Country: Serbia
- District: Jablanica District
- Municipality: Vlasotince

Population (2002)
  - Total: 165
- Time zone: UTC+1 (CET)
  - Summer (DST): UTC+2 (CEST)

Donje Gare is a village in the municipality of Vlasotince, Serbia. According to the 2022 census, the village recorded a population of 48. This was a lower count compared to the 2002 census, where the village had a population of 165 people.
