= Svođe =

Svođe Свође (Serbian)
- Village
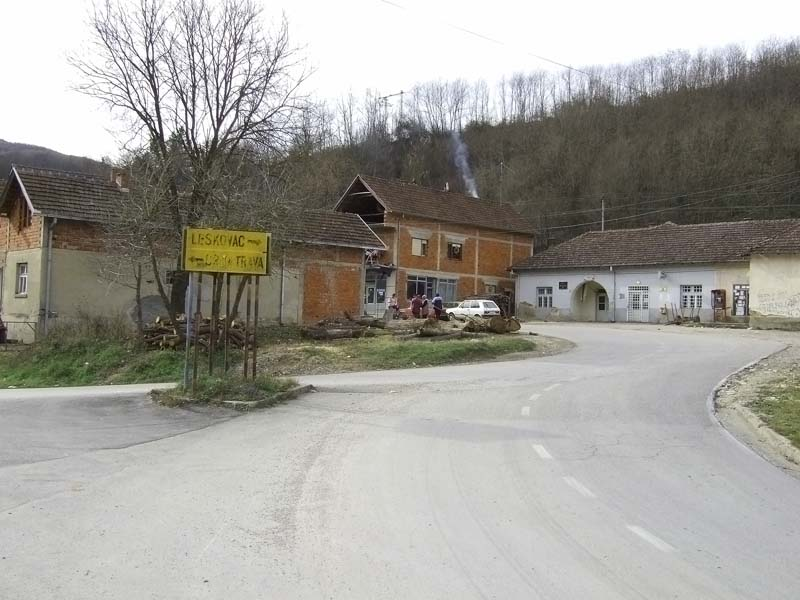

- Location within Serbia
- Coordinates: 42°58′37″N 22°15′54″E
- Country: Serbia
- District: Jablanica District
- Municipality: Vlasotince

Population (2002)
  - Total: 433
- Time zone: UTC+1 (CET)
  - Summer (DST): UTC+2 (CEST)

Svođe is a village in the municipality of Vlasotince, Serbia. According to the 2002 census, the village has a population of 433 people.
