= Stajkovce =

Stajkovce Стајковце (Serbian)
- Village
- Location within Serbia
- Country: Serbia
- District: Jablanica District
- Municipality: Vlasotince

Area
  - Total: 8.70 km^{2} (3.36 sq mi)
- Elevation: 281 m (922 ft)

Population (2022)
  - Total: 1,463
  - Density: 168/km^{2} (436/sq mi)
- Time zone: UTC+1 (CET)
  - Summer (DST): UTC+2 (CEST)
- Postal code: 16214

Stajkovce (Serbian Cyrillic: Стајковце) is a village located in the municipality of Vlasotince, southern Serbia. It is the largest village in the Municipality of Vlasotince. According to the 2011 census, the village has a population of 1,538 inhabitants. According to the 2022 census, the village has 1,463 inhabitants.

Locally it is considered as the most developed village in the Jablanica district.
