= Batulovce =

Batulovce Батуловце (Serbian)
- Village
- Location within Serbia
- Coordinates: 42°58′25″N 22°04′31″E
- Country: Serbia
- District: Jablanica District
- Municipality: Vlasotince

Population (2022)
  - Total: 696
- Time zone: UTC+1 (CET)
  - Summer (DST): UTC+2 (CEST)

Batulovce (Serbian Cyrillic: Батуловце) is a village in the municipality of Vlasotince, Serbia. According to the 2022 census, the village has a population of 696 people.
