= Orašje Zubci =

Orašje Zubci Орашје Зубци
- Village
- Location within Bosnia and Herzegovina
- Coordinates: 42°38′50″N 18°24′57″E
- Country: Bosnia and Herzegovina
- Entity: Republika Srpska
- Municipality: Trebinje
- Time zone: UTC+1 (CET)
  - Summer (DST): UTC+2 (CEST)

Orašje Zubci (Serbian Cyrillic: Орашје Зубци) is a village in the municipality of Trebinje, Republika Srpska, Bosnia and Herzegovina.
