= Gložane (Vlasotince) =

Gložane Гложане (Serbian)
- Village
- Location within Serbia
- Coordinates: 42°57′57″N 22°03′01″E
- Country: Serbia
- District: Jablanica District
- Municipality: Vlasotince

Population (2002)
  - Total: 660
- Time zone: UTC+1 (CET)
  - Summer (DST): UTC+2 (CEST)

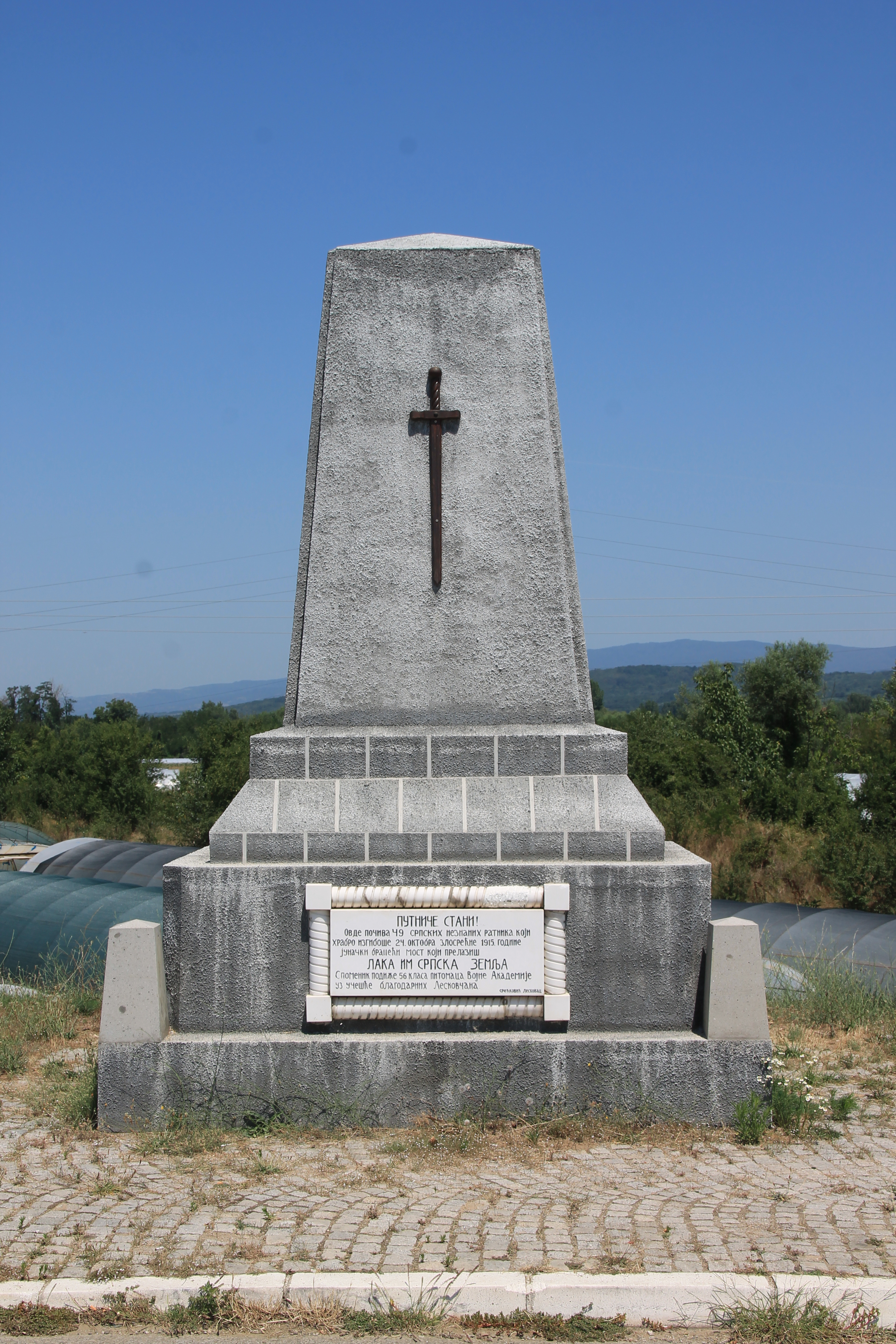
Monument to Unknown Heroes (Gložane).

Gložane is a village in the municipality of Vlasotince, Serbia. According to the 2002 census, the village has a population of 660 people.
