= Gornja Lomnica, Croatia =

Coordinates: 45°43′N 16°00′E

Gornja Lomnica
- Village
- Interactive map of Gornja Lomnica
- Country: Croatia
- County: Zagreb County
- Municipality: Velika Gorica

Area
  - Total: 2.0 km^{2} (0.77 sq mi)

Population (2021)
  - Total: 497
  - Density: 250/km^{2} (640/sq mi)
- Time zone: UTC+1 (CET)
  - Summer (DST): UTC+2 (CEST)

Gornja Lomnica is a settlement of Velika Gorica, which is part of the Zagreb metropolitan area, Croatia. The population is 580 (census 2011).

The local nickname for the settlement, which is given by the last ruler (Lord Meštić), is Meštrica.

Gornja Lomnica is a suburban settlement located a few kilometers southeast of the capital city of Croatia Zagreb, and Velika Gorica to the west.
