= Gornja Lomnica, Serbia =

Gornja Lomnica Горња Ломница (Serbian)
- Village
- Location within Serbia
- Country: Serbia
- District: Jablanica District
- Municipality: Vlasotince

Population (2002)
  - Total: 66
- Time zone: UTC+1 (CET)
  - Summer (DST): UTC+2 (CEST)

Gornja Lomnica is a village in the municipality of Vlasotince, Serbia. According to the 2002 Census, the village has a population of 66 people.
