= Orašje (Varvarin) =

Orašje Орашје
- Village
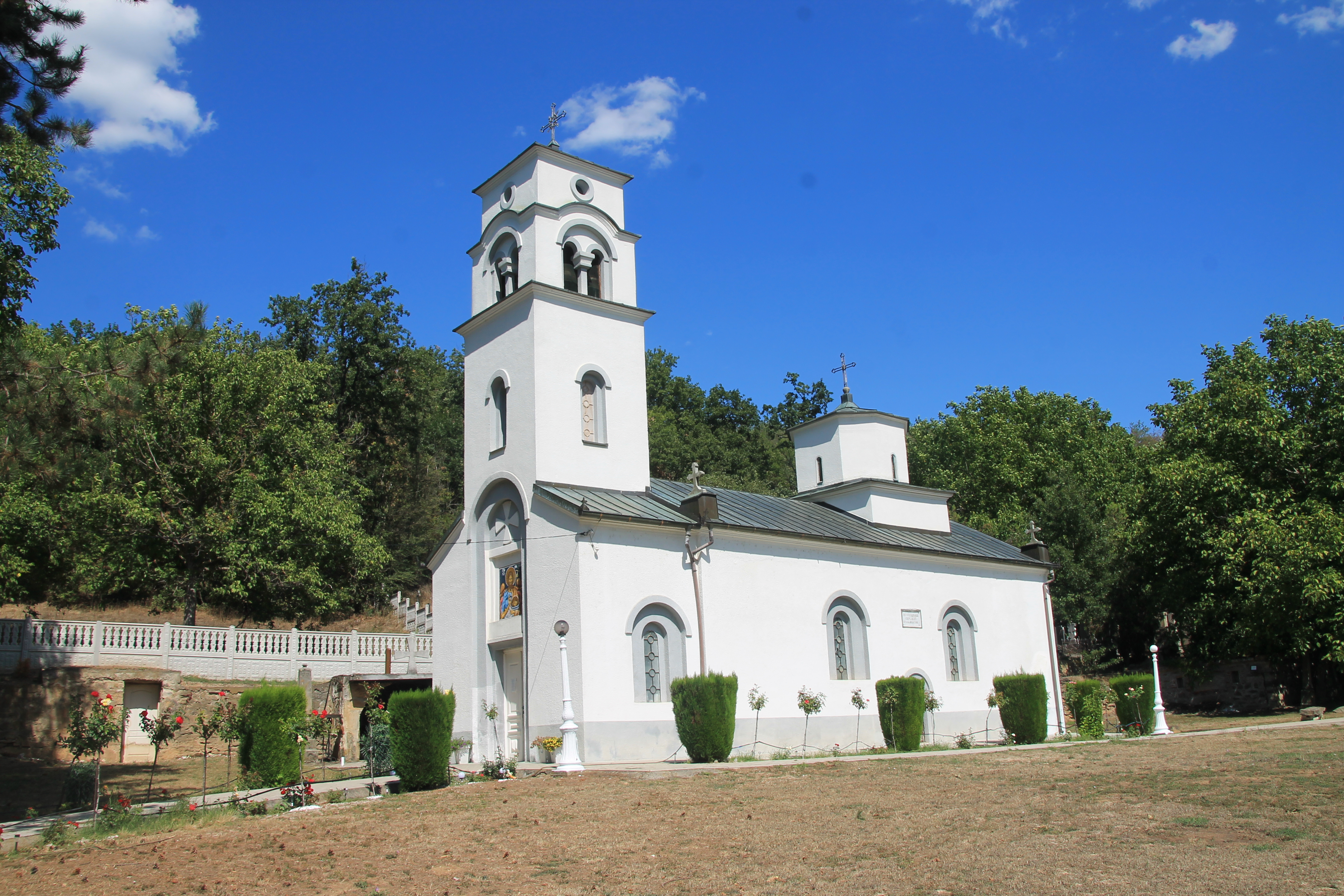

- Location within Serbia
- Coordinates: 43°44′36″N 21°16′07″E
- Country: Serbia
- District: Rasina District
- Municipality: Varvarin

Population (2002)
  - Total: 698
- Time zone: UTC+1 (CET)
  - Summer (DST): UTC+2 (CEST)

Orašje (Serbian Cyrillic: Орашје) is a village in the municipality of Varvarin, Serbia. According to the 2002 census, the village has a population of 698 people.
