= Orašje Popovo =

Orašje Popovo Орашје Попово
- Village
- Location within Bosnia and Herzegovina
- Country: Bosnia and Herzegovina
- Entity: Republika Srpska; Federation of Bosnia and Herzegovina
- Canton: Herzegovina-Neretva
- Municipality: Trebinje; Ravno

Area
  - Total: 2.66 sq mi (6.90 km^{2})

Population (2013)
  - Total: 33
  - Density: 12/sq mi (4.8/km^{2})
- Time zone: UTC+1 (CET)
  - Summer (DST): UTC+2 (CEST)

Orašje Popovo (Serbian Cyrillic: Орашје Попово) is a village in the municipality of Trebinje, Republika Srpska, Bosnia and Herzegovina and partially in the municipality of Ravno, Bosnia and Herzegovina.

== Demographics ==
According to the 2013 census, its population was 33: 3 Croats living in the Trebinje part and 30 Serbs with 25 of them in the Ravno part.
