= Orašje Površ =

Orašje Površ Орашје Површ
- Village
- Location within Bosnia and Herzegovina
- Coordinates: 42°40′N 18°16′E
- Country: Bosnia and Herzegovina
- Entity: Republika Srpska
- Municipality: Trebinje
- Time zone: UTC+1 (CET)
  - Summer (DST): UTC+2 (CEST)

Orašje Površ (Serbian Cyrillic: Орашје Површ) is a [ village in the municipality of Trebinje, Republika Srpska, Bosnia and Herzegovina.
