= Orašje, Tuzla =

Orašje
- Village
- Location within Bosnia and Herzegovina
- Coordinates: 44.5185388°N 18.6709511°E
- Country: Bosnia and Herzegovina
- Entity: Federation of Bosnia and Herzegovina
- Canton: Tuzla
- Municipality: Tuzla

Area
  - Total: 0.79 sq mi (2.04 km^{2})

Population (2013)
  - Total: 183
  - Density: 232/sq mi (89.7/km^{2})
- Time zone: UTC+1 (CET)
  - Summer (DST): UTC+2 (CEST)

Orašje is a village in the municipality of Tuzla, Tuzla Canton, Bosnia and Herzegovina.

== Demographics ==
According to the 2013 census, its population was 183.

Ethnicity in 2013
| Ethnicity | Number | Percentage |
|---|---|---|
| Croats | 170 | 92.9% |
| Bosniaks | 8 | 4.4% |
| Serbs | 1 | 0.5% |
| other/undeclared | 4 | 2.2% |
| Total | 183 | 100% |
