= Orašje, North Macedonia =

Orašje Орашје Orashë
- Village
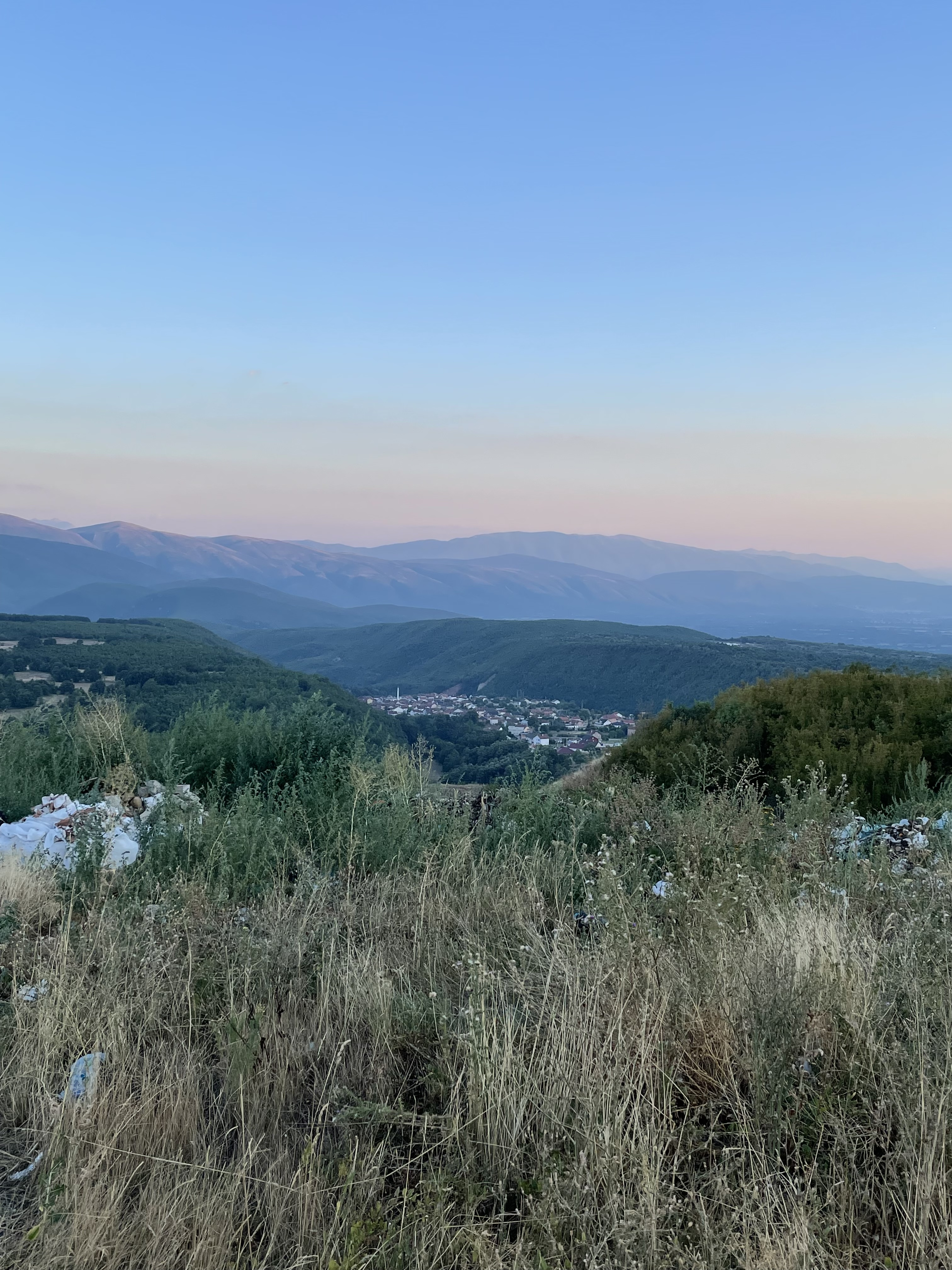

- Location within North Macedonia
- Coordinates: 42°07′46″N 21°08′12″E
- Country: North Macedonia
- Region: Polog
- Municipality: Jegunovce

Population (2002)
  - Total: 625
- Time zone: UTC+1 (CET)
  - Summer (DST): UTC+2 (CEST)
- Car plates: TE
- Website: .

Orašje (Macedonian: Орашје, Albanian: Orashë) is a village in the municipality of Jegunovce, North Macedonia. It used to be part of the former municipality of Vratnica.

== Demographics ==
According to the 2021 census, the village had a total of 625 inhabitants. Ethnic groups in the village include:

- Albanians 569
- Persons for whom data are taken from administrative sources 56

In statistics gathered by Vasil Kanchov in 1900, the village of Orašje was inhabited by 195 Muslim Albanians.
