= Orašje (Vlasotince) =

Orašje Орашје (Serbian)
- Village
- Location within Serbia
- Coordinates: 42°57′08″N 22°05′43″E
- Country: Serbia
- District: Jablanica District
- Municipality: Vlasotince

Population (2022)
  - Total: 728
- Time zone: UTC+1 (CET)
  - Summer (DST): UTC+2 (CEST)

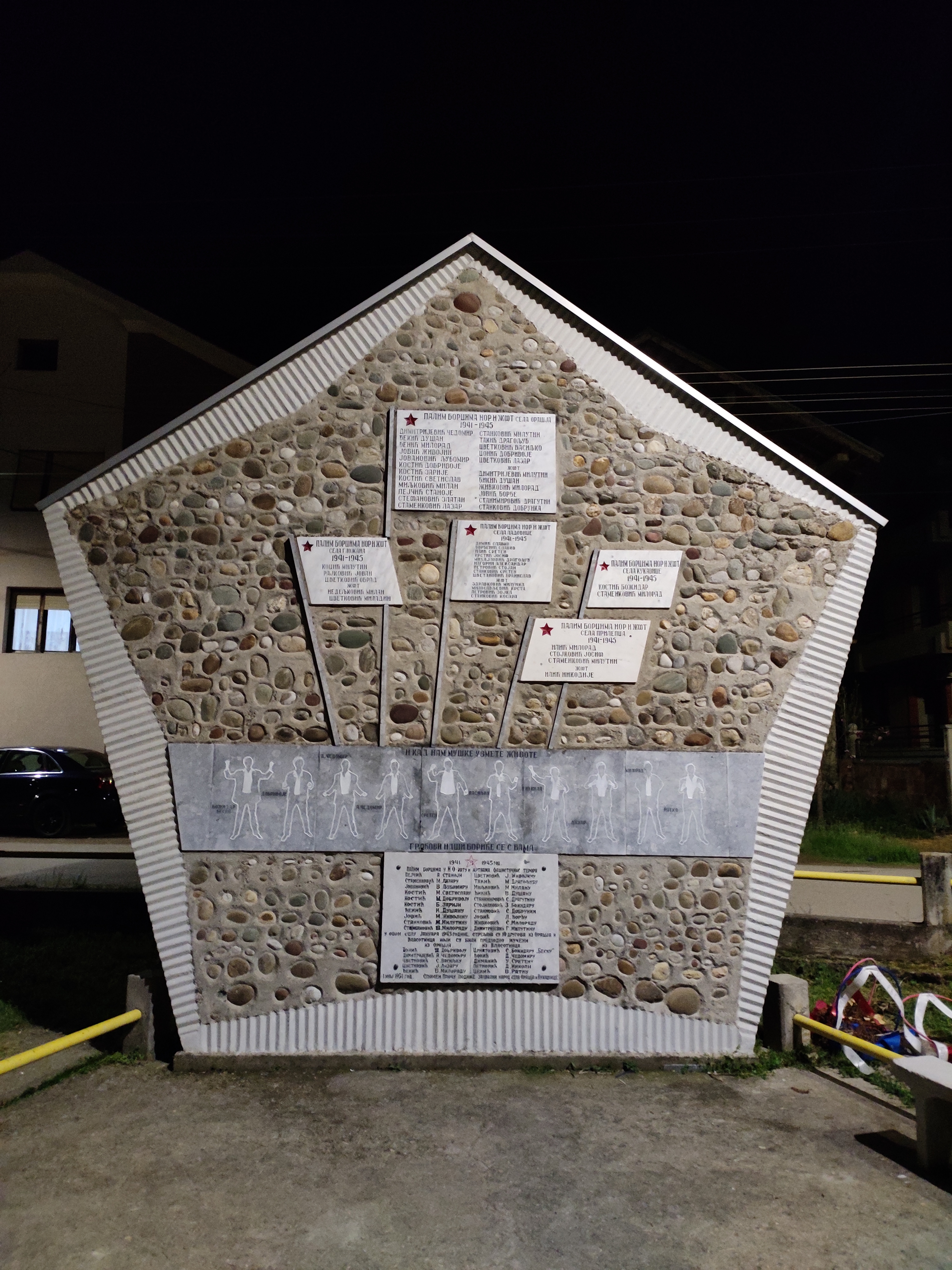
Monument to Fallen Fighters in Orašje

Orašje (Serbian Cyrillic: Орашје) is a village in the municipality of Vlasotince, Serbia. According to the 2022 census, the village has a population of 728 people.
