= List of administrators of occupied Serbia during World War I =

Occupation zones in occupied Serbia, 1915–1918. The Austro-Hungarian zone shown in yellow (with Albania and occupied Montenegro). The Bulgarian occupation zone shown in orange includes the Moravian Military Inspection and the Macedonian Military Inspection oblasts.

This article lists the administrators of occupied Serbia during World War I, which represented the Central Powers of World War I in Austro-Hungarian occupied Serbia and Bulgarian occupied Serbia from late 1915 to November 1918.

== Officeholders ==
=== Austro-Hungarian zone ===
Commanders

| No. | Portrait | Commander | Took office | Left office | Time in office | Defence branch |
|---|---|---|---|---|---|---|
| 1 | Oskar Potiorek | Feldzeugmeister; Oskar Potiorek (1853–1933) | 12 August 1914 | 27 December 1914 | 137 days | Austro-Hungarian Army |
| 2 | Archduke Eugen Ferdinand | Generaloberst; Archduke Eugen Ferdinand (1863–1954) | 27 December 1914 | 27 May 1915 | 151 days | Austro-Hungarian Army |
| 3 | Karl Tersztyánszky von Nádas | General of the Cavalry; Karl Tersztyánszky von Nádas (1854–1921) | 27 May 1915 | 27 September 1915 | 123 days | Austro-Hungarian Army |
| 4 | Hermann Kövess | General of the Infantry; Hermann Kövess (1862–1924) | 27 September 1915 | 1 January 1916 | 96 days | Austro-Hungarian Army |

Military Governors

| No. | Portrait | Governor-general | Took office | Left office | Time in office | Defence branch |
|---|---|---|---|---|---|---|
| 1 | Johann von Salis-Seewis | Feldmarschallleutnant; Johann von Salis-Seewis (1862–1940) | 1 January 1916 | July 1916 | 6 months | Austro-Hungarian Army |
| 2 | Adolf von Rhemen | Generaloberst; Adolf von Rhemen (1855–1932) | 6 July 1916 | October 1918 | 2 years, 2 months | Austro-Hungarian Army |
| 3 | Hermann Kövess | Feldmarschall; Hermann Kövess (1862–1924) | 1 October 1918 | 1 November 1918 | 31 days | Austro-Hungarian Army |

Civilian Commissioners

| No. | Portrait | Civilian Commissioner | Took office | Left office | Time in office |
|---|---|---|---|---|---|
| 1 | Lajos Thallóczy | Lajos Thallóczy (1857–1916) | 17 January 1916 | 1 December 1916 | 319 days |
| 2 | Teodor Kušević | Teodor Kušević | 1 January 1917 | 1 November 1918 | 1 year, 304 days |

=== Bulgarian zone ===
Commanders of the Moravian Military Inspection Oblast

| No. | Portrait | Commander | Took office | Left office | Time in office | Defence branch |
|---|---|---|---|---|---|---|
| 1 | Vasil Kutinchev | General; Vasil Kutinchev (1859–1941) | 27 November 1915 | 6 May 1917 | 1 year, 160 days | Royal Bulgarian Army |
| 2 | Aleksandar Protogerov | General; Aleksandar Protogerov (1867–1928) | May 1917 | December 1917 | 7 months | Royal Bulgarian Army |
| 3 | Petar Darvingov | Lieutenant colonel Petar Darvingov (1875–1958) | December 1917 | February 1918 | 2 months | Royal Bulgarian Army |

Commanders of the Macedonian Military Inspection Oblast

| No. | Portrait | Commander | Took office | Left office | Time in office | Defence branch |
|---|---|---|---|---|---|---|
| 1 | Racho Petrov | Racho Petrov (1861–1942) | 1915 | 1916 | 1 year | Royal Bulgarian Army |
| 2 | Pravoslav Tenev | Lieutenant colonel general Pravoslav Tenev (1862–1942) | 1916 | 1917 | 1 year | Royal Bulgarian Army |
| 3 | Stefan Toshev | General; Stefan Toshev (1859–1924) | 1915 | 1917 | 2 years | Royal Bulgarian Army |

== See also ==
- Serbian campaign
