= Military General Governorate of Serbia =

Military authority established by Austria-Hungary in occupied Serbia during World War I

Imperial and Royal Military General Governorate of Serbia k.u.k. Militärgeneralgouvernement Serbien (German)
- 1916–1918
- Flag

- Division of Serbia into an Austro-Hungarian and a Bulgarian occupation zone

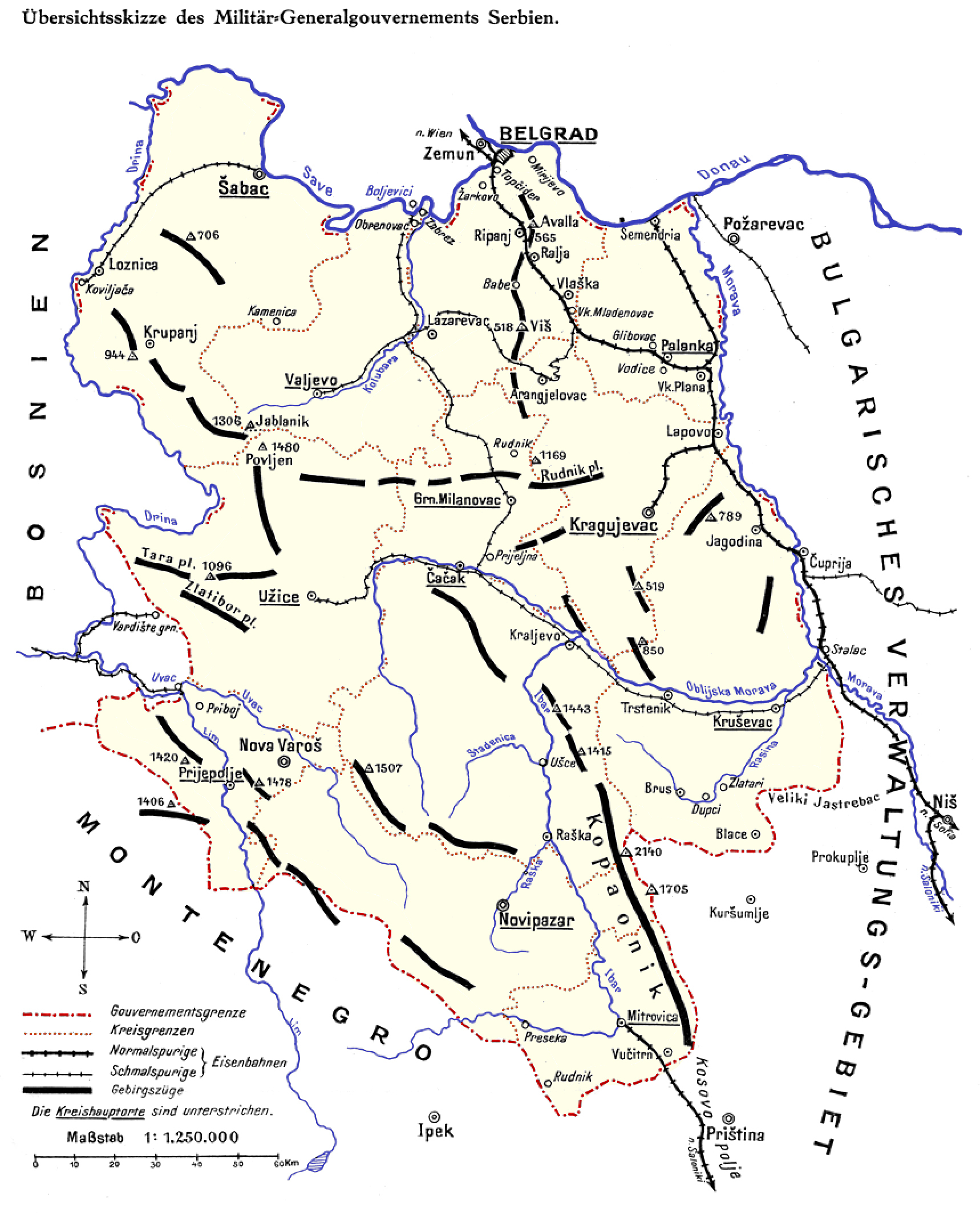
- Map of the Military Governorate of Serbia
- Status: Territory under Austro-Hungarian Military administration
- Capital: Belgrade
- Official languages: German
- Recognized national languages: Serbian
- Military Governor
  - 1916: Johann von Salis-Seewis
  - 1916–1918: Adolf von Rhemen
  - 1918: Hermann Kövess
- Historical era: First World War
  - Established: 1 January 1916
  - Territory liberated: 11 November 1918

Area
  - Total: 23,880 km^{2} (9,220 sq mi)

Population
  - 1916 estimate: 1 373 511
- Currency: Serbian dinar (Note: Handstamped with K.u.K. Militär-Generalgouvernement in Serbien)
- ISO 3166 code: RS
| Preceded by | Succeeded by |
| Kingdom of Serbia | Kingdom of Serbs, Croats, and Slovenes |
- Today part of: Serbia

The Military General Governorate of Serbia (German: Militärgeneralgouvernement Serbien, MGG/S for short) was a military administration established by the Austro-Hungarian Army during the Austro-Hungarian occupation of Serbia. The Governorate was formally established on 1 January 1916 during World War I. Along with Bulgarian occupied Serbia, it was one of the two separate occupation zones created after the Kingdom of Serbia was invaded and partitioned by the Central Powers.

Austro-Hungarian forces were drivien out of Serbia in October 1918, effectively ending the existence of the Governorate. It was formally dissolved with the signing of the Armistice on November 11.

== History ==
During the unsuccessful Austro-Hungarian Serbian campaign of 1914, a first military governorate was set up in Belgrade by the Austrian Supreme Command. Field-Marshal Stjepan Sarkotić, commander of the Devils's Division, was appointed military governor in November. The Serbian army's counteroffensive a month later liberated the country, ending the short-lived occupation. Following the Central Powers' Serbian campaign of 1915 and the subsequent retreat of the Serbian army, the country was divided into three zones of control, Austria-Hungarian, German and Bulgarian.

The Austro-Hungarian zone encompassed the northwestern part of Serbia, with Belgrade as its administrative centre, to the north-east corner near Negotin. The areas east of the Morava, Macedonia itself and most of Kosovo fell under Bulgarian occupation. The Germans decided not to seek territory for themselves but took control instead of railways, mines, forestry, and agricultural resources in both occupied zones; in the area east of Velika Morava, Južna Morava in Kosovo and the Vardar valley. The Austro-Hungarian occupiers established a similar military administration in the territory of the Kingdom of Montenegro.

The Austro-Hungarian Military Governorate in Serbia was officially started on 1 January 1916 by order of the Austro-Hungarian Supreme Command.

== Governance ==
The MGG/S was directly subordinated to the Austro-Hungarian Army High Command under Franz Conrad von Hötzendorf and later Arthur Arz von Straußenburg.

General Johann Graf von Salis-Seewis, a Croat by ethnicity, was appointed Military Governor-General by the Emperor at the end of 1915, he assumed his position on 6 January 1916. The governor-general was supported by Chief of Staff, Lieutenant Colonel Otto Gellinek, who been military attaché in Belgrade before the war.

General von Salis-Seewis was replaced by General Adolf Freiherr von Rhemen on 6 July 1916, while Colonel Hugo Kerchnawe succeeded Lieutenant Colonel Otto Gellinek.

A civilian commissioner was appointed by the Hungarian government, to assist the military governor-general. Dr. Ludwig (Lajos) Thallóczy, a Hungarian historian and Balkan expert, took office on 17 January 1916. After his accidental death in December 1916, he was succeeded by Teodor Kušević in January 1917.

| Military Governor | Term |
|---|---|
| Feldmarschallleutnant; Johann Ulrich Graf von Salis-Seewis | 1 January 1916 – 6 July 1916 |
| Generaloberst; Adolf Freiherr von Rhemen zu Barensfeld | 6 July 1916 – October 1918 |
| Feldmarschall; Hermann Kövess von Kövessháza | October 1918 – 1 November 1918 |
| Civilian Commissioner | Term |
| Lajos Thallóczy | 17 January 1916 – 1 December 1916 |
| Teodor Kušević | January 1917 – 1 November 1918 |

Four administrative departments were set up: military, economic, judicial, and political, with the latter under future Ustaše leader Slavko Kvaternik.

== Administrative divisions ==
The administrative divisions initially consisted of five county commands or provinces, based on pre-war Serbia's counties, as established during the brief occupation of 1914. After March 1916 the divisions came up to a total of twelve provinces plus the city of Belgrade: Each of the twelve provinces (German: Kreise), were ruled by a commander (German: Kreiskonimandanten) who was responsible for all military and civil affairs. The provinces were additionally divided into sixty-four districts (German: Bezirkskommandos). Civil administration in towns and villages was done by a Predsednik, a community leader chosen from the ranks of the local population.

The administrative divisions of the Military General Governorate of Serbia, 1916.

| Province | Population (based on MGG/S 1916 census) | Notes |
|---|---|---|
| Belgrade city | 9,000 (Note: from pre war population of 82 498) | from 1 January 1916 |
| Belgrade province | 179,173 | |
| Valjevo province | 117,502 | |
| Šabac province | 161,569 | |
| Gornji Milanovac province | 70,029 | |
| Kragujevac province | 155,461 | |
| Smederevo province | 117,254 | |
| Kruševac province | 195,655 | From 11 February 1916 |
| Čačak province | 114,783 | Established on 1 January 1916 and incorporated into the MGG/S in February the same year, with the following districts: Čačak, Kraljevo, Ivanjica, Guča, Ušće and (from August 1917) Raška. |
| Užice province | 114,061 | |
| Prijepolje province | 37,826 | From 15 March 1916 |
| Novi-pazar province | 71,746 | |
| Kosovska Mitrovica province | 45,912 | |

After the Austro–Bulgarian confrontation of April 1916, an agreement on a demarcation line was signed between the Austro- Hungarian and Bulgarian commands. Bulgaria retained the district containing Prizren and Pristina in Kosovo, while Austria-Hungary kept Elbasan.

== Dissolution ==
In mid October 1918, overwhelmed by the Allies offensive spearheaded by Serbian and French troops, Governor Hermann von Kövess ordered a retreat of all the remaining Austro-Hungarian personal behind the Danube, Save and Drina rivers; Belgrade was liberated on 30 October, thus ending the Military General Governorate of Serbia.

== See also ==
- Austro-Hungarian occupation of Serbia
- Bulgarian occupation of Serbia
- Serbian campaign
- List of administrators of occupied Serbia during World War I
