= Adolf von Rhemen =

Austro-Hungarian army officer (1855–1932)

Generaloberst Adolf von Rhemen
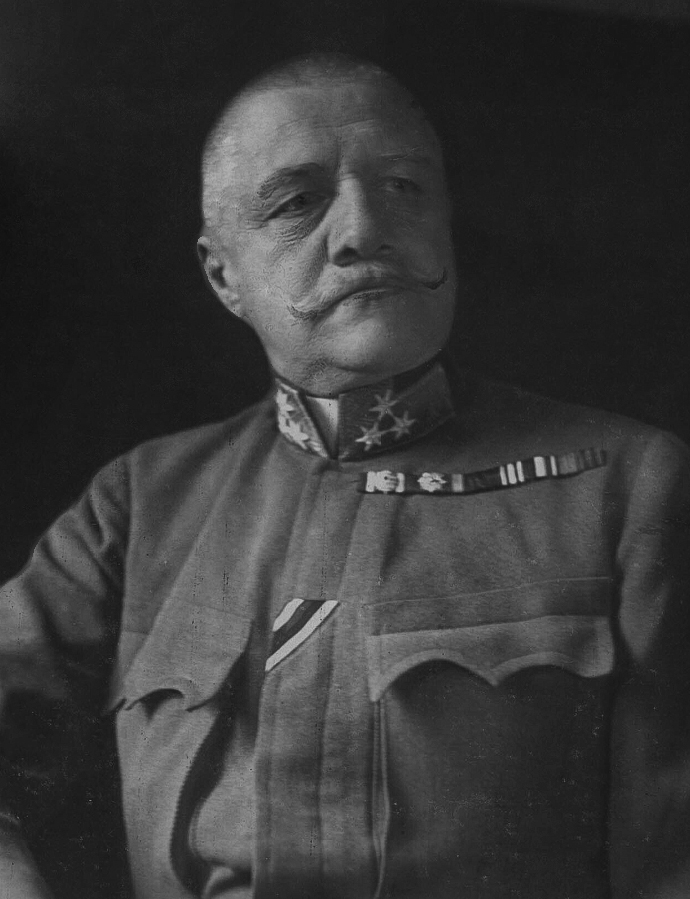
- Colonel General Adolf von Rhemen

2nd Austro-Hungarian Military Governor of Serbia
- In office 6 July 1916 – October 1918
- Preceded by: Johann Salis-Seewis
- Succeeded by: Hermann Kövess

Personal details
- Born: 22 December 1855 Rastatt, Grand Duchy of Baden, Germany
- Died: 11 January 1932 (aged 76) Rekawinkel, Austria
- Resting place: War cemetery, Pressbaum, Austria
- Education: Theresian Military Academy

Military service
- Allegiance: Austria-Hungary
- Branch/service: Austro-Hungarian Army
- Years of service: 1872–1918
- Rank: Colonel General
- Commands: XIII Army Corps; 34th Infantry Division; 9th Mountain Brigade; 72nd Infantry Brigade
- Battles/wars: World War I; Serbian Campaign (1914); Carpathian Front

Colonel General Adolf Freiherr von Rhemen zu Barensfeld (22 December 1855 – 11 January 1932), sometimes referred to as Baron Rhemen, was a German senior officer in the Austro-Hungarian Army, known for his commanding roles during the First World War.

Born into a German noble family settled in Austria, Rhemen became a professional soldier in 1876. During the First World War, he served as commander of XIII Corps, attached to the Fifth Army during the First Serbian Campaign. Later, he was transferred to the Eastern Front in Galicia, where XIII Corps served under the Austro-Hungarian Seventh Army. From 1916 to 1918, he held the position of Governor General of the Military General Governorate of Serbia, ultimately attaining the rank of Colonel general (Generaloberst) in the army in 1917. Following the collapse of the monarchy, he retired from service in December 1918. He died in Austria in 1932 at the age of 76.

== Early life and education ==
Adolf Freiherr von Rhemen zu Barensfeld was born on 22 December 1855, in Rastatt, Germany. His father, Eberhard Freiherr von Rhemen, was a Hauptmann (captain) in the Austro-Hungarian Army. His family belonged to the German nobility and had established ties in Austria. Rhemen attended school in Budweis, Bohemia, before studying at a military college in St. Pölten, Lower Austria, from 1870 to 1872. In 1872, he entered the Theresian Military Academy in Wiener Neustadt, graduating in 1876 with the rank of lieutenant in the 14th Infantry Regiment. He was promoted to first lieutenant in 1881 and attended the War School in Vienna from 1882 to 1884.

== Early military career ==
Upon graduation, Rhemen joined the Austro-Hungarian General Staff, advancing to captain in 1885 and major in 1894. By 1899, he became chief of staff of XIII Army Corps in Agram (modern-day Zagreb, Croatia). In 1905, he was promoted to major general and took command of the 72nd Infantry Brigade in Zagreb.

During the Austro-Hungarian occupation of Bosnia-Herzegovina in 1878, Rhemen took part in military operations in the region. On 23 November 1906, he was appointed commander of the 9th Mountain Brigade in Sarajevo. In 1907, he became brigade commander of the Austro-Hungarian occupation troops in Pljevlja, the seat of the Sanjak of Novi Pazar's administration.

Following Austria-Hungary's withdrawal from Pljevlja on 20 October 1908, Rhemen was appointed commander of the 34th Infantry Division in Temeschwar (modern-day Timișoara, Romania) on 14 March 1909. In 1910, he was promoted to lieutenant field marshal. On 12 October 1912, he assumed command of XIII Corps and the Agram Military District. His appointment aligned with Austro-Hungarian policy, which mandated that a German general lead the corps and commissariat in Zagreb. On 28 June 1914, while at the Zagreb railway station, he informed Franz Conrad von Hötzendorf, the Chief of the General Staff, of the assassination of Archduke Franz Ferdinand and Sophie, Duchess of Hohenberg in Sarajevo.

== First World War service ==
=== Command of XIII Corps ===
At the outbreak of World War I, Rhemen's XIII Corps was part of the Fifth Army, which alongside the Sixth Army, formed Minimalgruppe Balkan (Balkan Task Force), a unit assigned to the Balkan front by the Austro-Hungarian High Command (AOK).

==== XIII Corps ====
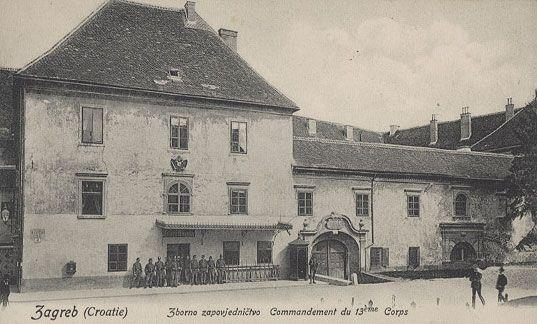
Headquarters of XIII Army Corps in Zagreb, Croatia.

XIII Corps, designated as a Croatian corps, included the renowned 42nd Home Guard Infantry Division, commonly known as the Devil's Division under the command of Croat officer Stjepan Sarkotić. It was the only unit in the Austro-Hungarian military granted permission to use Serbo-Croatian as its official language of command, instead of German or Hungarian. XIII Corps also included the 36th Infantry Division, led by Lieutenant field marshal Claudius Czibulka, stationed in Zagreb, and the 13th Infantry Brigade, based in Osijek. Regarded as one of Austria-Hungary’s elite corps, XIII Corps was headquartered in Zagreb. Altogether, XIII Corps fielded 33,000 troops and 114 artillery pieces.

==== Balkanstreitkräfte ====
On 25 July 1914, the Balkanstreitkräfte (Balkan Armed Forces) was formed by reinforcing Minimalgruppe Balkan with the Second Army, creating a force intended for the invasion of Serbia and Montenegro. Command was entrusted to Feldzeugmeister (Lieutenant General) Oskar Potiorek, the military governor of Bosnia and Herzegovina. Mobilisation orders for the offensive against Serbia were received on 26 July 1914.

==== XIII Corps in the first Serbian offensive ====
On 12 August 1914, General Oskar Potiorek ordered the invasion of Serbia, with Adolf von Rhemen's XIII Corps forming a key part of the offensive. Positioned along the lower Drina river in Bosnia, the Fifth Army, under Liborius Ritter von Frank, was tasked with encircling the Serbian centre at Valjevo. Rhemen's XIII Corps (33,000 men and 114 cannons) advanced alongside VIII Corps. However, Serbian fortifications made crossings difficult, and by nightfall, half of XIII Corps remained in Bosnia. The 36th Infantry Division successfully crossed between Loznica and Lešnica, while the 42nd Division, advancing south along the Drina, moved toward Zvornik and Ljubovija.

On 14 August, XIII Corps launched an assault on Serbian positions but suffered heavy casualties. Despite capturing Gornji Dobrić, the 36th Division took significant losses. The 42nd Division, crossing the Drina, was accompanied by Bosniak militia, some of whom engaged in looting and burning villages. Serbian forces put up fierce resistance, but XIII Corps advanced to Krupanj, where it clashed with elements of the Serbian 3rd Army. Ordered to press on despite the 21st Division's destruction, XIII Corps, now operating alongside IV Corps, continued pushing eastward.

On 18 August, Rhemen's forces launched a renewed attack, with the 36th Division securing a strategic hill. However, Serbian counterattacks inflicted heavy losses, forcing XIII Corps into a defensive retreat towards Loznica. As VIII Corps fell back, XIII Corps covered its withdrawal, enabling an orderly retreat across the Drina. By 24 August, Rhemen's corps had fully withdrawn from Serbian territory, marking the end of the first invasion. During that first invasion, the Balkanstreitkräfte suffered 600 officer casualties and 23,000 soldier losses. Rhemen's XIII Corps reported heavy casualties, with each of its two divisions losing over 3,000 men. The 25th Royal Croatian Home Guard Regiment suffered over 800 dead, while the Croatian 16th Regiment recorded 54 officers and 1,004 men as casualties.

==== XIII Corps in the second Serbian invasion ====
Following the failure of the initial offensive, XIII Corps was again deployed as part of a renewed Austro-Hungarian effort to subdue Serbia. On 6 September 1914, under Allied pressure, Serbian General Petar Bojović launched a counteroffensive into Austria-Hungary, capturing Semlin (Zemun) in Syrmia. In response, Potiorek ordered XIII Corps to participate in a second invasion of Serbia, beginning 14 September. Supported by observation balloons and river monitors from the Danube flotilla, XIII Corps and VIII Corps advanced towards the confluence of the Drina and Sava rivers. However, Serbian resistance inflicted severe casualties, and by late September, both sides became entrenched in trench warfare. On 20 October, Potiorek halted offensive operations, as XIII Corps had suffered significant losses without achieving a breakthrough. Military historian Mark Clodfelter estimated 40,000 Austro-Hungarian casualties, with 30,000 Serbian losses during this phase.

==== XIII Corps' retreat in the third Serbian invasion ====
On 6 November, Potiorek initiated a third offensive, assigning XIII Corps to the Sixth Army. Rhemen's corps advanced alongside XV Corps, attacking the Serbian 3rd Army, while other Austro-Hungarian forces sought to encircle Serbian positions. By 7 November, Serbian forces began retreating to avoid encirclement. On 15 November, XIII Corps played a key role in the capture of Valjevo, with Rhemen's units continuing their pursuit of Serbian forces into the Kolubara region. On 2 December, as Serbia's 1st Army withdrew southeast, Austro-Hungarian forces occupied an abandoned Belgrade. The occupation was short-lived, as a massive Serbian counteroffensive began on 3 December, targeting Rhemen's XIII Corps along the Kolubara River. Despite orders to hold, XIII Corps, now stretched thin, sustained heavy casualties. During the retreat, on 7 December, a bridge collapse caused chaos among Rhemen's withdrawing troops. By mid-December, XIII Corps was forced to withdraw across the Sava, evacuating Belgrade before Serbian forces reentered the city on 15 December.

The withdrawal of XIII Corps and other Austro-Hungarian units marked the end of the campaign. The Serbian campaign had been a disaster for Austria-Hungary, as 450,000 Austro-Hungarian troops failed to defeat Serbia's numerically inferior forces. Rhemen's XIII Corps suffered heavily, contributing to the 273,804 Austro-Hungarian casualties, including 28,000 dead, 122,000 wounded, and 40,000 missing. Serbian casualties totaled 22,000 dead, 91,000 wounded, and 19,000 missing.

==== War crimes allegations during the Serbian campaign ====
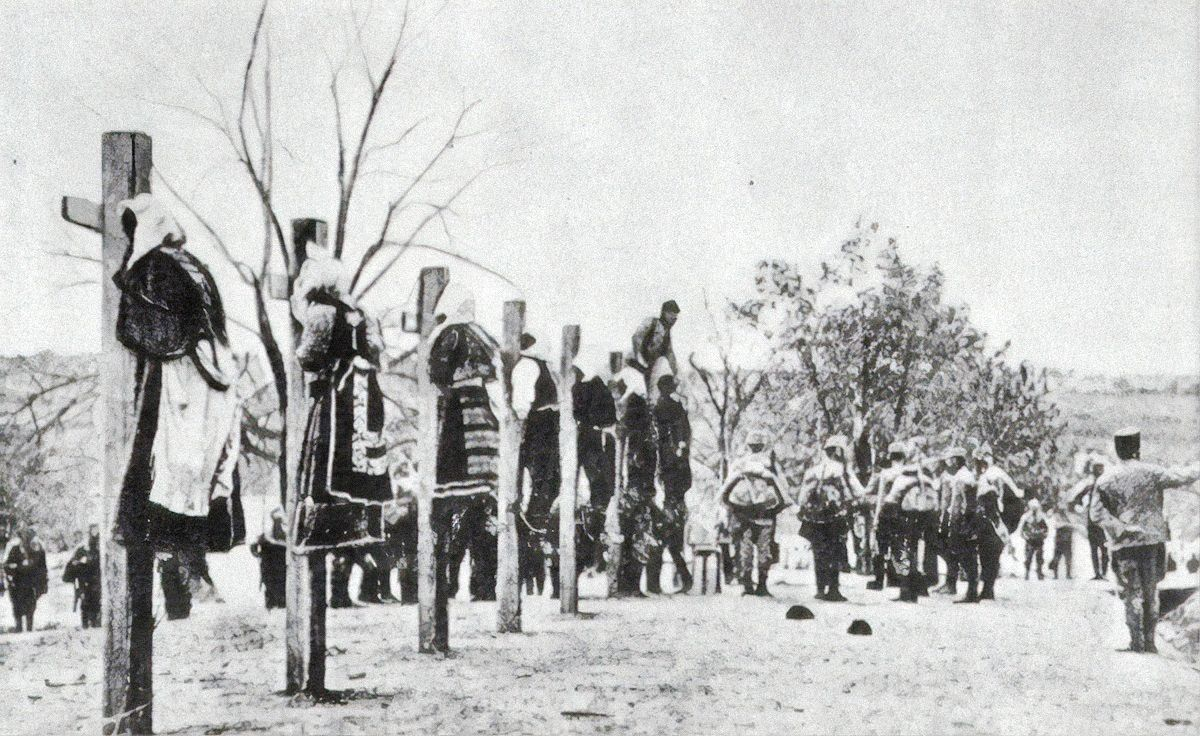
Austria-Hungarian troops hanging Serbian civilians in Mačva.

During the First Serbian Campaign, elements of the Austro-Hungarian Army, including units under XIII Corps, committed war crimes against Serbian civilians. Reports indicate that Austro-Hungarian troops engaged in executions, mass reprisals, and destruction of villages in the Mačva region, Jadar valley, and areas near Loznica and Lešnica.

Historian Geoffrey Wawro documented that Austro-Hungarian forces, including troops under XIII Corps, executed Serbian civilians, including men, women, and children. Swiss criminologist R. A. Reiss, who investigated the atrocities, concluded that thousands of Serbian civilians were massacred with extreme brutality. On 13 August 1914, Potiorek issued punitive orders instructing all units, including XIII Corps, to seize hostages, conduct reprisal executions, and burn villages in response to Komitadji partisan activity. Some of these actions were carried out by the 42nd Home Guard Division near Zvornik, as well as other units in Krupanj and Zavlaka, where entire groups of civilians were executed after being tied together.

Sources suggest that Rhemen justified these atrocities by describing the Serbs as "a culturally backward people", arguing that adhering to the laws of war was impractical in such conditions.

==== XIII Corps on the Carpathian front ====
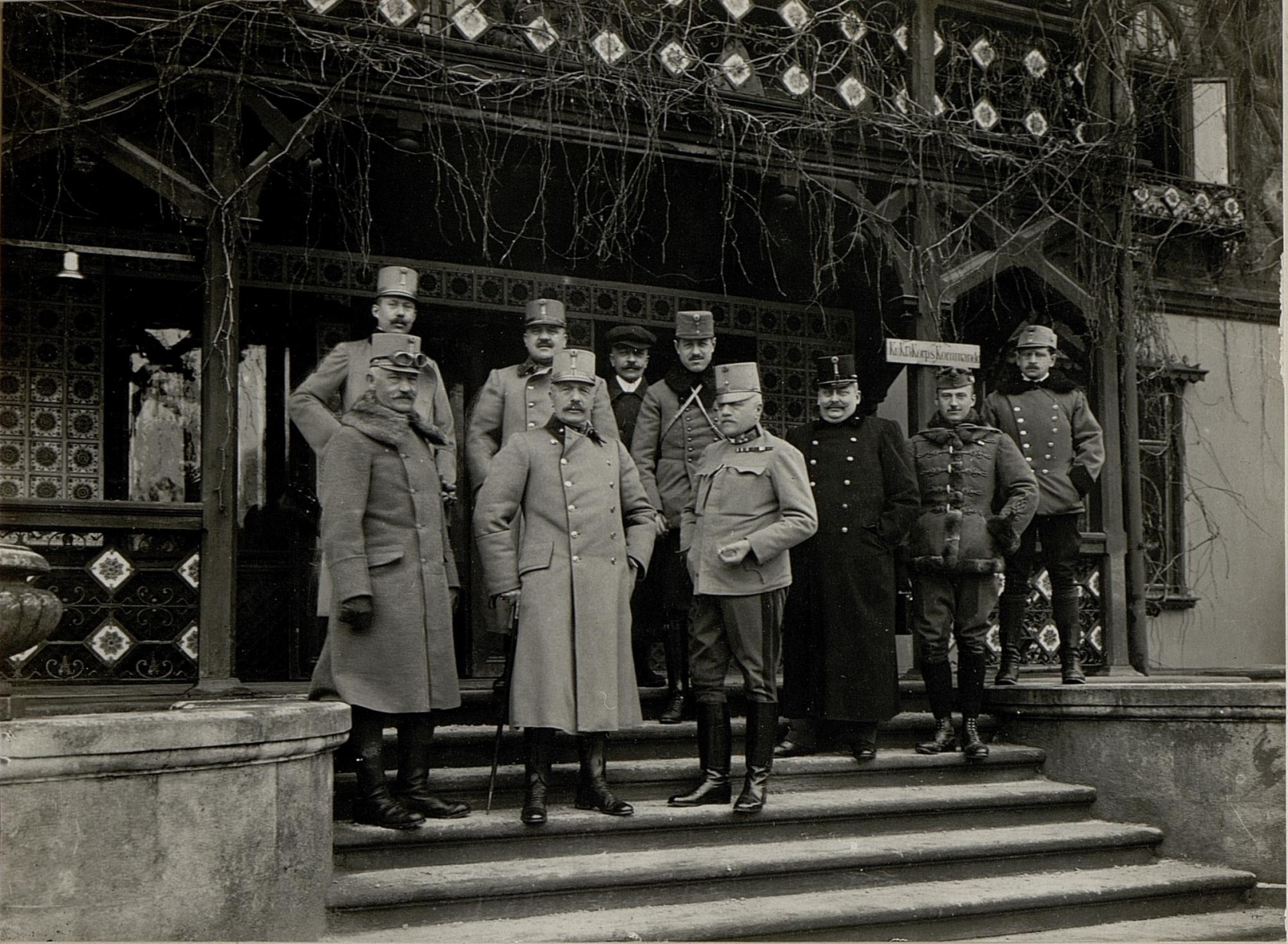
XIII Corps' Baron Rhemen and Hermann von Colard, governor of Austrian Galicia, on 18 February 1916.

Following the failed Serbian campaign, Adolf von Rhemen's XIII Corps was redeployed to the Carpathian Front in mid-January 1915. As part of Army Group Pflanzer-Baltin, XIII Corps participated in the First Carpathian Offensive (23 January – 26 February 1915), operating with the 36th Infantry Division and the 42nd Home Guard Infantry Division. On 8 May 1915, Army Group Pflanzer-Baltin was reorganized as the Seventh Army.

Now under Seventh Army command, XIII Corps was headquartered in Kolomyya, Ukraine, under General Karl von Pflanzer-Baltin. During its deployment in Eastern Galicia, Rhemen's corps engaged in the Brusilov offensive, facing the Russian Dnister Group and later the Russian Ninth Army. During the Battle of Dniestr and Zolota Lypa, one of Rhemen's divisions collapsed, leading to the surrender of approximately 7,000 troops. As the Seventh Army suffered severe losses, Rhemen reported to Pflanzer-Baltin that his corps was incapable of further resistance. The Russian advance devastated the army, which lost 57% of its strength, forcing a retreat to the Carpathian foothills.

In July 1916, following the corps' heavy losses, Rhemen was dismissed from command and replaced by Lieutenant Field Marshal Maximilian Csicserics von Bacsány. His command of XIII Corps ended after nearly four years, from 12 October 1912 until July 1916.

=== Military governorship of Serbia ===
In early 1915, Rhemen was considered as a replacement for the civilian governor of Croatia to lead a crackdown on nationalist movements. Officers of German origin, like him, were deemed the most impartial to address the South Slavic question. Additionally, Rhemen's fluency in Serbo-Croatian, acquired through his service in the Sanjak of Novi Pazar and Croatia, made him a suitable candidate for leadership roles in the region.

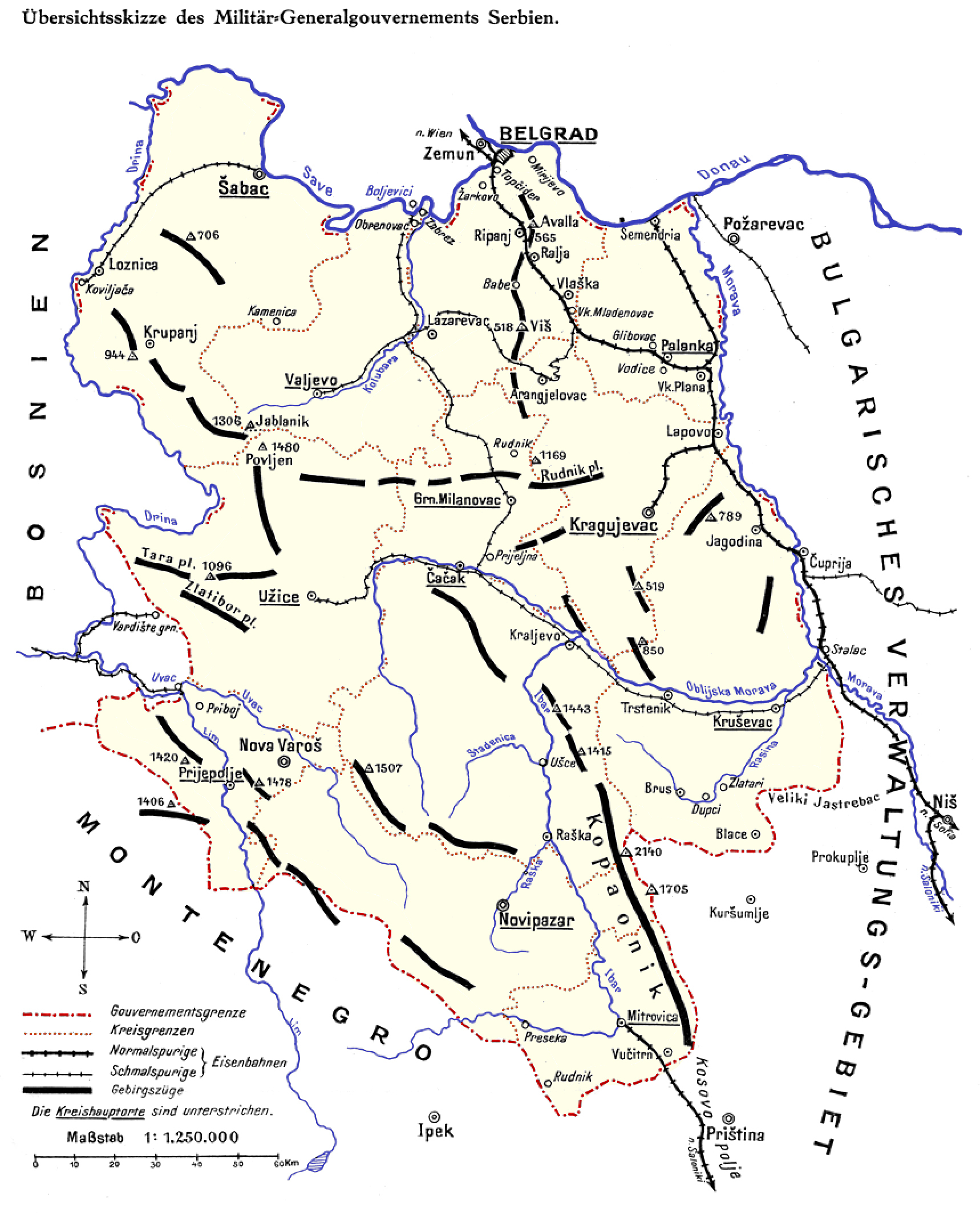
Austro-Hungarian occupation zone in Serbia governed by General von Rhemen.

Following the defeat of the Serbian army and the occupation of Serbia in July 1916, the high command (Armeeoberkommando AOK) appointed Rhemen as military governor-general of the Military General Governorate of Serbia (MGG/S) on 6 July 1916. The appointment was formalised through a decree by Emperor Franz Joseph I on 26 July 1916. Rhemen succeeded Johann von Salis-Seewis, with Colonel Hugo Kerchnawe serving as his chief of staff. The removal of Salis-Seewis, whom the Hungarians viewed as too lenient toward the Serb population, followed recommendations by Hungarian Prime Minister István Tisza and pressure from Imperial Foreign Minister Count Stephan Burián. Rhemen's appointment signaled a stricter regime during the Austro-Hungarian occupation of Serbia, promising to impose "order and justice".

Shortly after his nomination, Tisza expressed reservations about Rhemen's connections in Croatia. In a letter to the emperor, he stated: "I ask His Majesty to note that despite General Rhemen's excellent personal qualities, I also harbor reservations due to his relationships in Croatia. I respectfully submit that, in the interest of preventing further disruptions, it would be highly desirable for Hungarians to be appointed to both positions, individuals of non-Slavic origin with no ties to South Slavic communities." One of Rhemen's initial actions was the deportation of Serbs who were politically active or part of the intelligentsia. He later ordered the internment of males capable of bearing arms, starting at age seventeen. Many fled into the woods, pursued by military expeditions. Those suspected of encouraging others to flee were subjected to summary court martial and executed. Within two months, 16,000 Serbs were sent to internment camps; by the end of the year, the number reached 70,000, causing a severe labor shortage in the MGG/S. Rhemen's request to the AOK for more prisoners of war to serve as laborers was denied.

In early 1917, during the Toplica uprising, a large-scale rebellion against the occupation, Rhemen ordered the "ruthless extermination" of Chetnik bands. Villages aiding Serbian rebels faced mass internments of their male populations. Individuals found with weapons or suspected of supporting the rebels were executed. Hostages, including women if no men were available, were taken as a punitive measure.

On 1 May 1917, Rhemen was promoted to colonel general. In 1918, a Serbian woman attempted to assassinate him, but his staff adjutant intervened to prevent the attack. On 28 October 1918, as the Serbian army and Allied forces advanced on occupied Serbia, Rhemen departed the region with his staff and Baron Kuhn, the Foreign Ministry's representative. Hermann Kövess von Kövessháza officially took over as Governor from October 1918 to 1 November 1918.

== Retirement and death ==
Rhemen retired from military service on 1 December 1918. he died on 11 January 1932 in Rekawinkel, Austria, and was buried in the war cemetery on 14 January, in Pressbaum, Austria.

== Honours ==
Rhemen is a recipient of the Grand Cross of the Royal Hungarian Order of Saint Stephen, and of the Order of Philip the Magnanimous.
