= Bulgarian occupation of Serbia (World War I) =

Bulgaria military occupation of Serbia during WW1

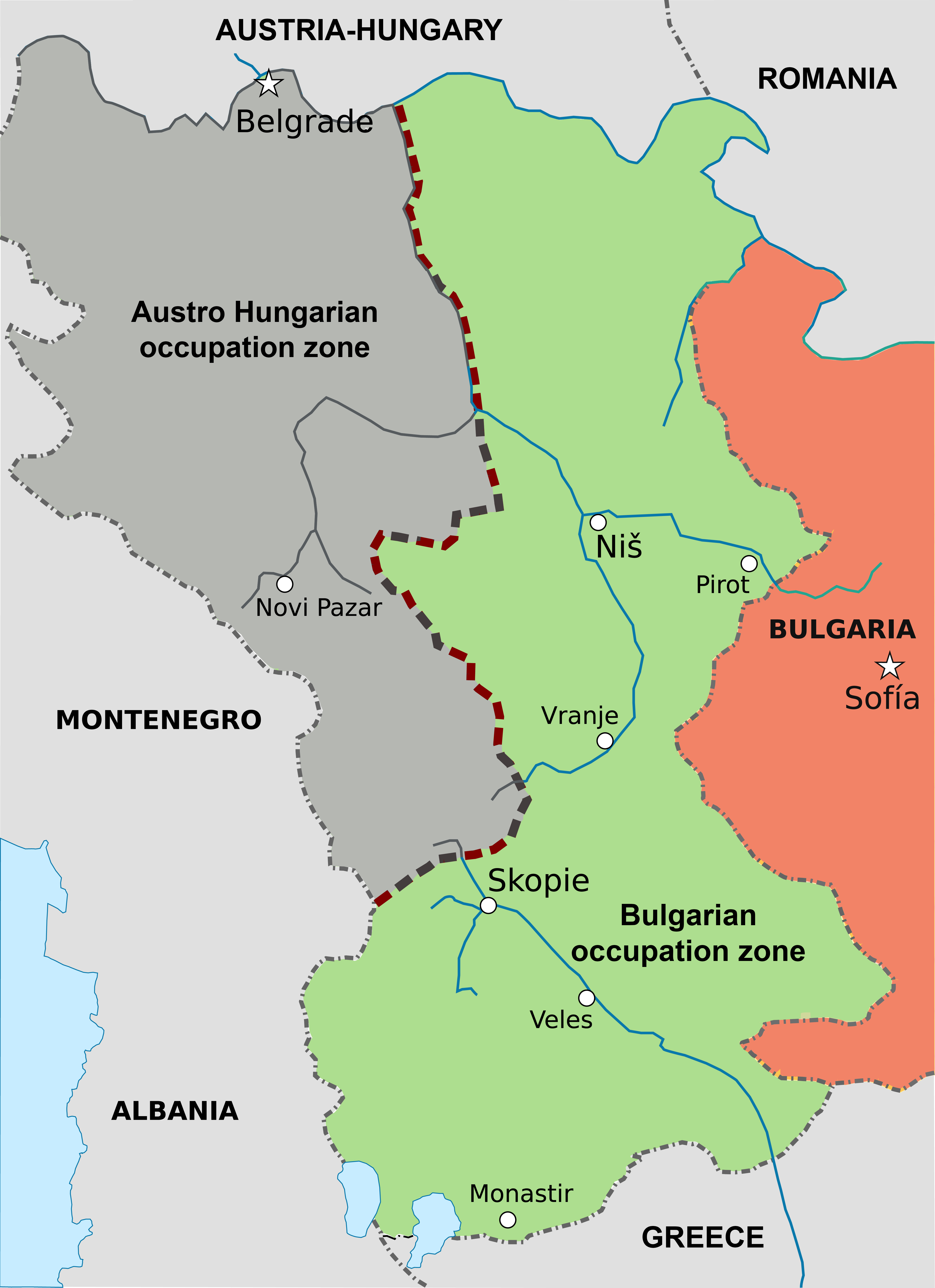
- Bulgarian occupation zone of Serbia (in green)
- Date: 17 November 1915–29 September 1918 (2 years, 10 months and 2 days)
- Location: South and Eastern Serbia (Macedonia, east of Morava) Kosovo; 42°33′N 21°54′E

The Bulgarian occupation of Serbia during World War I started in Autumn 1915 following the invasion of Serbia by the combined armies of Germany, Austria-Hungary and Bulgaria. After Serbia's defeat and the retreat of its forces across Albania, the country was divided into Bulgarian and Austro-Hungarian occupation zones.

The Bulgarian occupation zone extended from modern-day Southern and Eastern Serbia, Kosovo and North Macedonia. The civilian population was exposed to various measures of repression, including mass internment, forced labor, and a Bulgarisation policy. According to academic Paul Mojzes: "it appears that ethnic cleansing (at a minimum) and genocide (at the maximum) did take place between 1915 and 1918", what historian Alan Kramer has termed a: "dynamic of destruction".

The occupation ended in late September 1918, after the Allied offensive at Dobro Polje, spearheaded by Serbian and French forces, pierced the Bulgarian front and liberated Serbia.

== Background ==
=== Bulgaria war aims ===
In the wake of the 1878 Treaty of San Stefano, Bulgarian leaders aspired to reconstitute Greater Bulgaria, making the Serbian regions of Pomoravlje and Macedonia preoccupations of Bulgarian irredentism. After its defeat in the Second Balkan War in 1913, the Kingdom of Bulgaria had to limit its ambitions over Macedonia. With Serbia trying to obtain sea access through Albania, the Austro-Hungarians took measures to establish a strong border between Albania and Montenegro. With the Florence Protocol in December 1913, Bulgaria renounced its claims on Serbian Macedonia, which was annexed to Serbia.

The Entente had been pressing Bulgaria to join them; Bulgaria's price was the acquisition of the long-coveted region of Macedonia from Serbia and Greece. The Entente regarded this as reasonable on ethnic grounds but it was strongly opppsed by both Serbia and Greece. (Note: The Entente offered Serbia compensation in the form of control over Bosnia and Herzegovina, Slavonia, Bačka, portions of Dalmatia unaffected by the Treaty of London, and parts of northern Albania. The Entente promised Bulgaria more territorial and financial concessions for joining them, including an offer of Macedonia and adding part of Eastern Thrace to the Enos-Midia line. They also guaranteed substantial financial assistance and full support in pressuring Greece to cede Kavalla, while Romania was to return Southern Dobrudja. Bulgarian Prime Minister Vasil Radoslavov rejected the Entente proposals on 14 June for lack of clarity.) The Central Powers, however, were prepared to cede Serb and Greek territory to Bulgaria should the Bulgarians join them. Bulgaria's traditional aims lay in the Bulgarian-inhabited areas of Macedonia, Dobrudja, and European Turkey, but in 1915 it demanded territory well beyond its ethnographic borders. On 6 September 1915, the Bulgarian government joined the Central Powers upon signing a secret treaty of alliance with Germany.

=== Invasion of Serbia ===
On 6 October 1915 under the overall command of German General August von Mackensen, Austria-Hungary and Germany began the fourth invasion of Serbia since the beginning of the war. On 14 October, the Bulgarian armies moved into Serbian territory joining the ongoing invasion. Bulgaria entered the war on the side of the Central Powers, with the primary goal of regaining territory briefly gained from the Ottoman Empire in 1912–13, then lost to Serbia in 1913. The pressure of Austro-Hungarian, Bulgarian and German armies in the north, and their massive superiority in numbers and equipment, forced the Serbs to withdraw across northern and central Albania. On 28 November 1915, Army Group Mackensen announced the end of the Serbian campaign, thereby ending the offensive.

The Kingdom of Serbia was overrun after the six-week campaign. It was then divided between Austria-Hungary and Bulgaria. In early 1916, regions in the west and north and part of Kosovo were also ceded to Austria-Hungary. Germany established its own occupation zone in the area east of Velika Morava, Južna Morava in Kosovo and the Vardar valley. The Germans took control of railways, mines, forestry, and agricultural resources. The agreement of 6 September granted Bulgaria the whole of Macedonia and Eastern and Southern Serbia, from the Danube to Kosovo in the south. The new border with Austria-Hungary ran along the Morava river to Stalać and then between the South (Južna) and West (Zapadna) Morava rivers, the region of Skopska Crna Gora and Šar Planina mountain. Austro-Hungary took the rest of Serbia. The Bulgarians divided the territories occupied by their troops into two military general governorates.

== Bulgarian hegemony ==
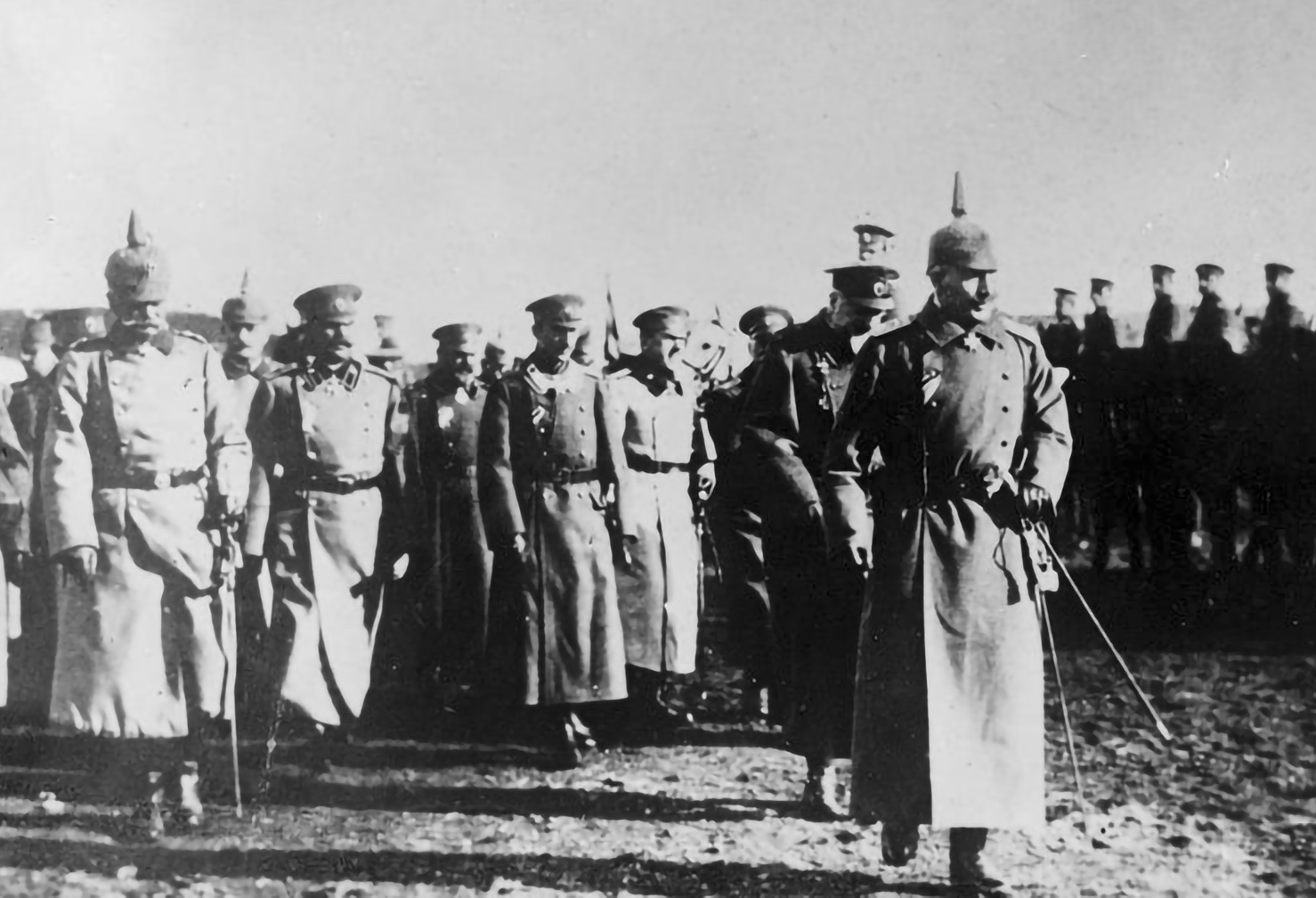
German Kaiser Wilhelm II, Tsar Ferdinand I of Bulgaria and Field Marshal August von Mackensen in Niš, Serbia, 18 January 1916.

=== Occupation zones ===
Two administrative zones supervised by a military commander were created:

- Military Inspection Area of Morava: The zone for Serbia with its command in Niš, it encompassed the territories of Eastern and Southern Serbia, (as laid down in the secret treaty between Bulgaria and Germany of 6 September 1915), which meant the Južna Morava river valley east of the Morava river, divided into six districts and the Pirot area.
- Military Inspection Area of Macedonia: The zone encompassing Macedonia, with its center in Skopje; the greater part of Kosovo field – Pristina, Prizren, Gnjilane, Urosevac, Orahovac was also placed in that zone; the Bulgarians intended to include all of Kosovo and even parts of Albania occupied by their troops into that zone, in the spring of 1916, this nearly resulted in armed conflict between Bulgarian and Austrian forces.

=== System of occupation ===
Bulgarian policy in Macedonia, and to some degree in occupied Serbia, was motivated by what historian Alan Kramer has termed a 'dynamic of destruction' a desire not just to defeat the enemy militarily, but also to erase all traces of its culture and destroy any evidence that it had ever been there at all. To create pure Bulgarian territories, the Bulgarian military government started implementing in eastern Serbia, Macedonia, and parts of Kosovo a political system of systematic denationalization, Bulgarisation, and economical exploitation.

In the Morava zone, where the majority of the population was Serbs, transforming the region into a part of the Kingdom of Bulgaria, meant the extermination of the Serbian nation and culture and for this the removal of all representatives of Serbian national spirit; teachers, clergymen, journalists as well as members of Serbian Parliament as well as former soldiers, officers and military official between 18 and 50 years of age were interned, shot or deported to Bulgaria as prisoners of war or to work as forced labourers.

In the zone of Macedonia, Bulgaria, like Serbia, did not recognise the local Slav population as a separate ethnic or national group. Both Bulgaria and Serbia considered the Slavic-speaking population as being ethnically linked to their nation and thus asserted the right to seek their integration. The Bulgarian denationalisation policy, including its paramilitary aspect, was almost identical in its intent and execution to the Serbianisation policy that preceded it in the contested region between the two countries. About half of Vardar Macedonia, as the region was called by Serbia, was also inhabited by various ethnic groups who did not identify as Bulgarian; according to a 1912 survey by the British Foreign Office, namely Serbs, Turks, Albanians, Greeks, Vlachs, (Note: probably Aromanians and Megleno-Romanians) Jews and Gypsies. (Note: The British Foreign Office cited the following figures: Macedonian Slavs 1,150,000, Turks 400,000, Greeks 300,000, Vlachs 200,000, Albanians 120,000, Jews 100,000, and Gypsies (Romas) 10,000. While the Bulgarians claimed all Macedonian Slavs as Bulgarians, the Serbs claimed those of Vardar Macedonia as Serbs, or South Serbs.) In the eastern parts of the region, where a considerable part of Macedonian Slavs had pro-Bulgarian sentiments (Note: According to Krste Misirkov, for Macedonian Slavs at the time there was no widespread ethnic Macedonian identity but instead a regional Macedonian identity and a Bulgarian ethnic feeling.) or felt themselves to be Bulgarians, that population welcomed the Bulgarian army as liberators. For the rest of the population and in particular for the Macedonian Slavs who identified as Serbs (or those who felt neither Serb nor Bulgarian), the brutality of the Bulgarian army, the irregulars Komitadji and the later civil administration had all the features of ethnic cleansing.

=== Role of paramilitaries ===
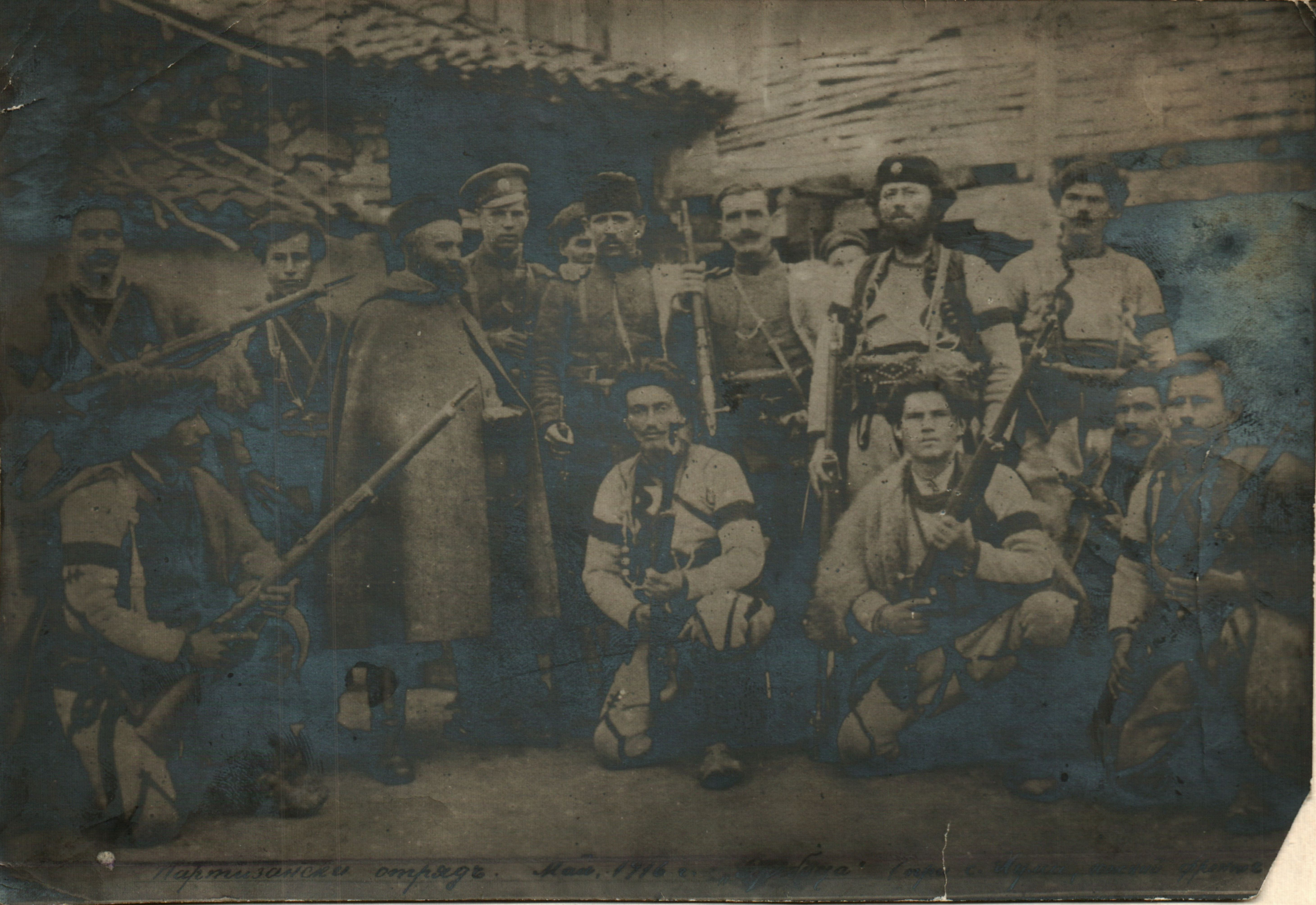
IMRO paramilitaries as part of 11th Macedonian Infantry Division a Bulgarian military unit c.1916

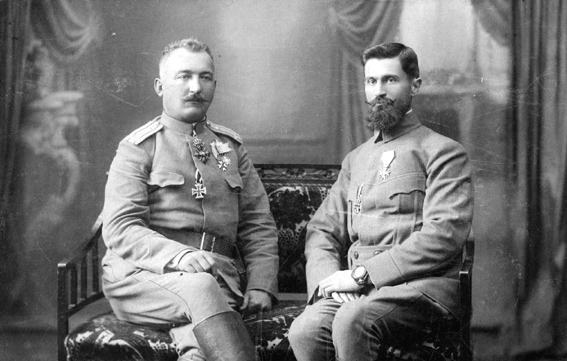
IMRO members, such as Todor Aleksandrov and Aleksandar Protogerov, played a prominent role in the oppression that took place during the Bulgarian occupation of Serbia.

Besides the regular army, Bulgaria's paramilitary groups played an immense part in the fighting capabilities of Bulgaria, they were used as auxiliaries to provide knowledge of local conditions. They were known as komitadjis, these irregular troops also contributed strongly in brutalising the war. The notorious Internal Macedonian Revolutionary Organization (IMRO) served as a gendarmerie working hand in glove to Bulgarianise the region. During the war the IMRO arose from a clandestine organization into an important factor of the Bulgarian nationalistic policy supporting the Bulgarization of the area.

Some paramilitary companies joined the Bulgarian Army forming the 11th Macedonian Infantry Division. Additionally, this division had guerrilla companies formed by IMRO-irregulars, that participated at the beginning of 1916 in several massacres of Macedonian Serbs in the areas of Azot, Skopska Crna Gora and Poreče. After the massacres, the Military police chief informed the Minister of Internal Affairs that he could not cope with the lawlessness of the paramilitaries. Regular Bulgarian troops took control of the region while komitadjis were appointed mayors and prefects and took control of the whole police structure. Every major town was controlled by a komitadji leader whose power became absolute and legitimized through a new administrative system. IMRO member Naum Tomalevski, whose house was the headquarters of the Ilinden Uprising of 1903, was appointed mayor of Kruševo. After 1917 the Bulgarian government started using paramilitary groups to gain control over the internal situation in both Pomoravlje and Macedonia. Aleksandar Protogerov who headed the Bulgarian occupation troops in the Morava region crushed the uprising in the Toplica district with the help of IMRO irregulars. Bulgarians paramilitary groups were responsible for multiple instances of war crimes committing during the war in the parts of the Kingdom of Serbia under Bulgarian occupation.

=== War crimes ===
Bulgarian Tsar Ferdinand declared on the eve of war: "the purpose of my life is the destruction of Serbia". Many Bulgarian troops were side-lined from front line duty to take part in the occupation of Serbia, past animosities led to brutality, the local population was left a choice between Bulgarisation or being subject to violence, large scale deportations and the treatment of the residents of the occupation zones came close to genocidal actions.

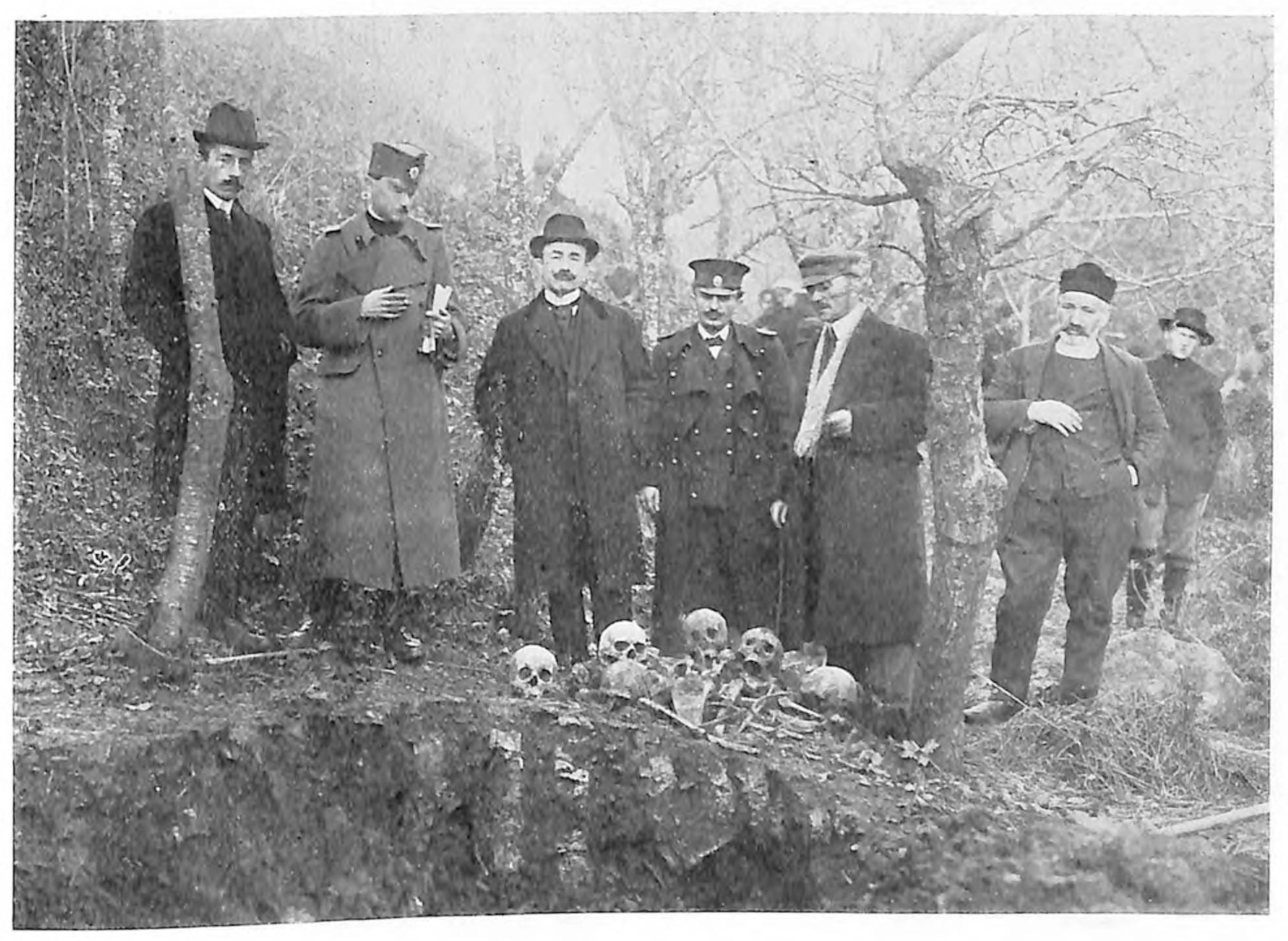
Exhumation of Serbs executed by Bulgarian occupiers in Surdulica between 1916 and 1918.

The Documents relatifs aux violations des Conventions de La Haye et du Droit international, commis de 1915–1918 par les Bulgares en Serbie occupée, a report covering alleged atrocities committed in Serbia, published after the war, stated that ‘anyone unwilling to submit him or herself to the occupiers and become Bulgarian was tortured, raped, interned, and killed in particularly gruesome manners, some of which recorded photographically'. Bulgarian units that occupied Serbian territories showed extreme brutality, systematically expelling the non-Bulgarian population in the regions they occupied, they arrested the population and set the rebel villages on fire.

In addition to the numerous cases of rape, Bulgarian forces encouraged the mixed marriage of Serbian women with Bulgarian men and espoused the view that children born to such marriages should be raised as Bulgarians. Middle-class Serbian functionaries were also suppressed: teachers, religious workers, functionaries, and intellectuals were executed by the Bulgarian soldiers who were following strict instructions to treat civilians the same way they treated soldiers. Additionally, there were regular bombardments of Serbian territories by the aviation and Bulgarian artillery which were operating on the Balkan front around the end of 1916. At the same time, there was a prohibition of Serbian culture; Bulgarians systematically looted Serbian monasteries and the toponymy of villages was changed to Bulgarian.

In addition to those sent to concentration camps, some 30,000 Serbs were sent to Austrian camps or used as forced labour. Factories were plundered of their machinery and a devastating typhus epidemic stalked the land. Thousands died in desperate uprisings, and in some cases, Bulgarian policy was so rigid that it even provoked mutinies among its own soldiers. The Bulgarian soldiers are depicted as simply living off the land without paying any redistribution and also robbing and hitting civilians, whereas the peasants had to work for the occupational authorities without getting any pay, this sometimes included working on defensive positions and carrying ammunition for the Bulgarians which violated the Hague conventions.In ex-Serb Macedonia, for the first time in history, gas chambers were used for the purpose of mass executions, exhaust pipes of trucks were attached to sealed sheds by Bulgarian soldiers where they herded the Serbs whom they wished to eliminate.

=== Counter-insurgency operations ===
==== Serbian Uprising ====
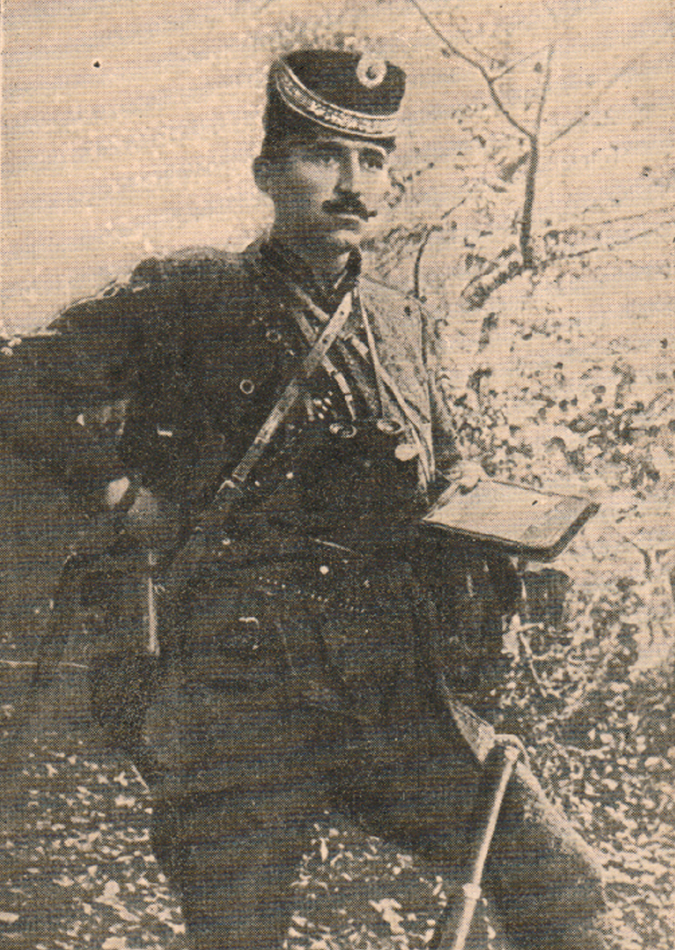
Kosta Vojinović, one of the leaders of the Toplica insurrection

From October 1916 to February 1917, a spontaneous Serbian uprising broke out in the Bulgarian-occupied territories of southern and eastern Serbia, notably in the valley of the Južna Morava, on Mount Kapaonik and in Kosovo. It followed attempts by the Bulgarian army to force draft Serbian men into the Bulgarian army and shoot those who resisted. The scheme was identical to that previously pursued by the Serbian army, which in August 1914 had attempted to conscript more than 60,000 people from Macedonia on the frontline defense of Serbia against the Austria-Hungarian attack.

Chetnik Lieutenant Kosta Milovanović-Pećanac was flown by the Serbian supreme command southwest of Niš to locate and organise rebel action against enemy lines of communication, in preparation for a Serbian army offensive from the Salonika front. Most Serbian guerrilla leaders, including both Kosta Vojinović and Kosta Pećanac, set up their headquarters on Mount Kapaonik. By 3 March guerilla units made of local inhabitants had liberated Kuršumlija and Prokuplje as well as regions in the areas of Vlasotince and Sokobanja, coming 9 km southwest of Niš. General Adolf Baron von Rhemen, governor of the Military General Governorate of Serbia, ordered Austro-Hungarian troops to cross into the Bulgarian zone in support while requesting the Austrian Supreme Command to send assistance. Three armies of around 30,000 men tasked with crushing the uprising were sent to the region in the largest-ever anti-guerilla campaign. Austro-Hungarian, German and Bulgarian troops were brought from the Macedonian and Italian front, while in the Mitrovica district, Albanian gendarmes were sent to track down rebel leaders. On 8 March, the Bulgarian army started their offensive while supported by Albanian detachments, artillery and air support. The Austro-Hungarians launched their attack on 12 March 1917.

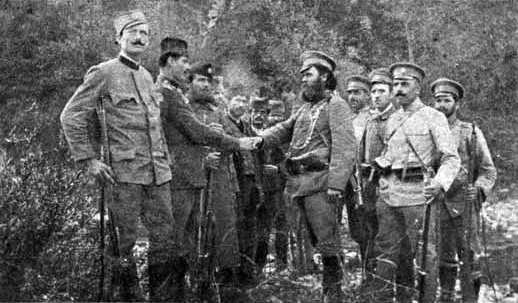
A group of Serb insurrectionists surrendering to IMRO comitadji Tane Nikolov after the rebellion.

IMRO leader Aleksandar Protogerov was called to assist the Bulgarian army with the counter-insurgency operations, which were met with harsh reprisals throughout the country. On 10 March 1917 Protogerov issued an ultimatum to the chetniks to surrender within five days or face execution. They did not surrender, so Protogerov and his army attacked the civilian population and their villages. About 20,000 Serbs were killed in fighting, executions or reprisals. In the town of Surdulica alone about 2,500 Serbian men were executed, thousands of women and children were interned and others were sent to prison. Thirty-six villages near Leskovac were completely depopulated. Families were left without a house or home. More than 80,000 were deported to Bulgaria, in Niš, almost the entire male population, some 4,000 men, was deported. One batch was sent by train to Pirot and the rest had to go on foot.

On 24 March the Austro-Hungarian ordered its troops out of the Bulgarian zone, on 25 March the Bulgarian command officially ended its operation. On 28 March Protogerov declared an amnesty, promising internment instead of execution; none of the prominent Serb guerrilla and military leaders surrendered and continued instead guerilla actions on the occupiers throughout the rest of the war.

The insurrection of the Serb population is remembered as the only armed uprising of an occupied population in the whole of World War One. (Note: The first armed uprising of World War Two would also be against the same enemy occupiers of Germans, Austrians, Hungarians, Bulgarians and Croatians)

== Liberation and aftermath ==
On 15 September 1918, French and Serbian mountain troops successfully attacked hitherto impregnable Bulgarian positions at Dobro Pole. Greek and British forces joined in, the Bulgarians, deprived of German and Austrian support, quickly found themselves in full flight, pursued by the Army of the Orient. The Bulgarian Tsar and government decided to seek an armistice, capitulating on 30 September, the first of the Central Powers to do so. According to its terms, Bulgarian troops had to evacuate all occupied Greek and Serbian territories, including Macedonia.

The Serb army returned in 1918 to find a land devastated by war and exploitation; besides losing 210,000 men of its armed forces, Serbia suffered an additional 300,000 civilian casualties out of a 3.1 million population, material losses were incalculable.

After the defeat of Bulgaria and the return of Macedonia, the Slav population of the area was declared Serbian and Bulgarian cultural, religious, and educational institutions were closed down. Bulgaria was forced to give up all its conquered territory as a consequence of the Treaty of Neuilly imposed by the Allies, its army was reduced to a force of 20,000 volunteers and stripped of much of its equipment; four small regions (referred to by Bulgarians as the Western Outlands) were ceded to the Kingdom of the Serbs, Croats and Slovenes, its population also declared Serbian. Bulgaria would return in 1941, as an ally of Nazi Germany, to once more occupy the lands it believed were rightfully its own.

== International response to Bulgarian war crimes ==
In 1899 and 1907 for the first time, an International Peace Conferences was held at The Hague. The conference brought forward a codification of the customs and laws of war. Following the first world war, the Inter-Allied Commission a fifteen-member commission was created, ahead of the upcoming Paris Peace Conference of 1919, to report violations of the Hague Conventions, international laws, document war crimes and identify the perpetrators.

=== Inter-Allied Commission ===
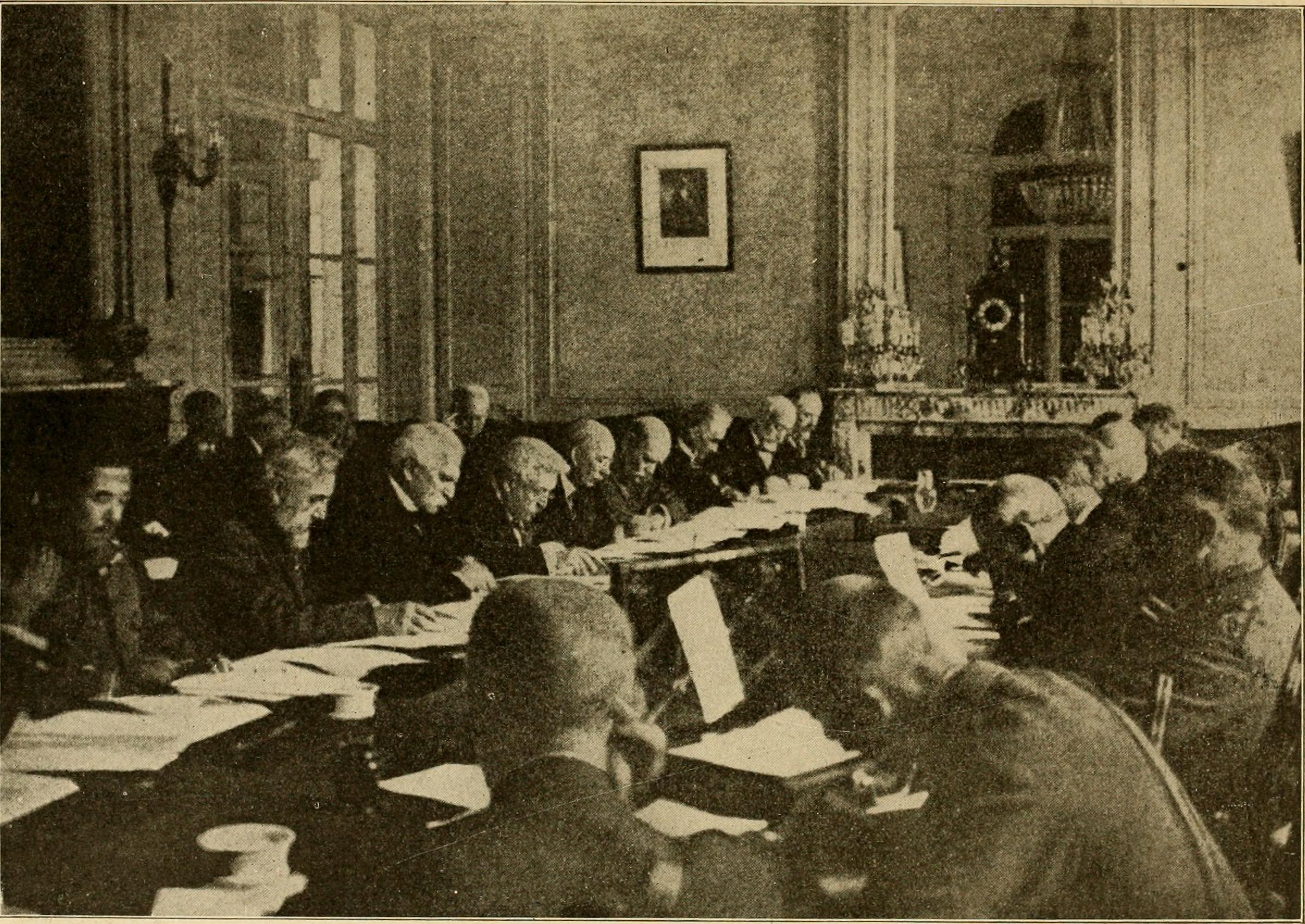
Paris Peace Conference of 1919

The reports of the commission in Eastern Macedonia summarised the violations of the Hague Conventions: the massacre of the civilian population, torture, rape, internment, punitive economic expropriation, requisitions, and various taxes, plunder, forced labor, destruction, arson, and other actions aimed at "destroying the Serbian presence in the newly occupied territories".

We can affirm that there is not a single article of the Convention of The Hague or principle of international law that the Bulgarians did not violate.

— Report of the Inter-Allied Commission in Eastern Macedonia,

=== Paris Peace Conference ===
At the Peace Conference of 1919, the Commission on the Responsibility of the Authors of the War and on Enforcement of Penalties, a precursor of the United Nations War Crimes Commission, was created. The Commission organized war crimes "against the laws of war and humanity" into thirty-two specific classes including: "massacres, rapes, deportations and internments, tortures and deliberate starvation, forced labour and systematic terrorism".

The majority of the Commission came to the conclusion that the war of 1914–1919 was carried on by the Central Powers and their allies, Turkey and Bulgaria, with barbarian and illegitimate methods, in violation of the laws and customs of war and elementary principles of humanity

— Report of the Commission on the Responsibility of the Authors of the War,

== Military governors ==
- Military Inspection Area of Morava
  - 1915 – 1917: Lt General Vasil Kutinchev (Note: commanded the invasion of Serbia during the second Balkan War)
  - 1917: Major general Aleksandar Protogerov
  - 1917 – 1918: Lt General Stefan Nerezov
- Military Inspection Area of Macedonia
  - 1915 – 1916: Lt General Racho Petrov
  - 1916 – 1917: Lt General Pravoslav Tenev
  - 1915 – 1917: General Stefan Toshev

== See also ==
- Bulgarian irredentism
- Serbian campaign (1915)
- Bulgaria during World War I
- Austro-Hungarian occupation of Serbia
  - Military General Governorate of Serbia
- Liberation of Serbia, Albania and Montenegro (1918)

== Sources ==
- Banac, I. (2015). The National Question in Yugoslavia: Origins, History, Politics. Cornell University Press. ISBN 978-1-5017-0193-1.
- Batakovic, Dusan (2005). "Les frontières balkaniques au XX" [The Balkan Borders in the 20th century]. Guerres Mondiales et Conflits Contemporains (in French). 1 (217): 29–45. doi:10.3917/gmcc.217.0029.
- BBC News (2019-02-24). "Greece's invisible minority - the Macedonian Slavs". BBC News.
- Bechev, D. (2009). Historical Dictionary of the Republic of Macedonia. Historical Dictionaries of Europe. Scarecrow Press. ISBN 978-0-8108-6295-1.
- Braun, A. (1983). Small-State Security in the Balkans. Palgrave Macmillan UK. ISBN 978-1-3490-6133-4.
- Carter, N.; Strohn, M.; Corum, J.S.; Obe, M.M.C.B.; Zabecki, D.T.; Murphy, D.; Boff, J.; Yockelson, M.; Höbelt, L.; Johnson, R. (2018). 1918: Winning the War, Losing the War. Bloomsbury Publishing. ISBN 978-1-4728-2934-4.
- Daskalov, R.D.; Marinov, T. (2013). Entangled Histories of the Balkans - Volume One: National Ideologies and Language Policies. Balkan Studies Library. Brill. ISBN 978-9-0042-5076-5.
- Raymond Detrez (2006). Historical Dictionary of Bulgaria. Scarecrow Press, Incorporated. ISBN 978-0-8108-4901-3.
- DiNardo, Richard L. (2015). Invasion: The Conquest of Serbia, 1915: The Conquest of Serbia, 1915. ABC-CLIO. ISBN 978-1-4408-0093-1.
- Marvin Fried (2014). Austro-Hungarian War Aims in the Balkans during World War I. Springer. ISBN 978-1-1373-5901-8.
- Gerwarth, R.; Horne, J. (2013). War in Peace: Paramilitary Violence in Europe After the Great War. The Greater War. Oxford University Press Oxford. ISBN 978-0-1996-8605-6.
- Glenny, Misha (2012). The Balkans: Nationalism, War, and the Great Powers, 1804-2012: New and Updated. House of Anansi Press Incorporated. ISBN 978-1-7708-9274-3.
- Richard C. Hall (2010). Balkan Breakthrough: The Battle of Dobro Pole 1918. Indiana University Press. ISBN 978-0-2530-0411-6.
- Jelavich, C.; Jelavich, B. (2012). The Establishment of the Balkan National States, 1804-1920. A History of East Central Europe (HECE). University of Washington Press. ISBN 978-0-2958-0360-9.
- Kaufman, S.J. (2015). Modern Hatreds: The Symbolic Politics of Ethnic War. Cornell Studies in Security Affairs. Cornell University Press. ISBN 978-1-5017-0199-3.
- Kramer, Alan (2008). Dynamic of Destruction: Culture and Mass Killing in the First World War. Oxford University Press Oxford. ISBN 978-0-1915-8011-6.
- Le Moal, Frédéric (2008). La Serbie du martyre à la victoire. 1914-1918 [Serbia from martyrdom to victory] (in French). Paris: Éditions SOTECA, 14-18 Éditions. ISBN 978-2-9163-8518-1.
- Mitrović, Andrej (2007). Serbia's Great War, 1914-1918. Purdue University Press. ISBN 978-1-5575-3476-7.
- Mojzes, Paul (2011). Balkan Genocides: Holocaust and Ethnic Cleansing in the Twentieth Century. Rowman & Littlefield. ISBN 978-1-4422-0663-2.
- National Archives (U.S.) (1943). Handbook of Federal World War Agencies and Their Records, 1917-1921. Publication (National Archives (U.S.). U.S. Government Printing Office.
- Nedev, Svetlozar (1993). Command of the Bulgarian army during the war (in Bulgarian). Military Publishing Complex "St. George the Victorious".
- Newman, J.P. (2015). Yugoslavia in the Shadow of War: Veterans and the Limits of State Building, 1903–1945. Cambridge University Press. ISBN 978-1-1070-7076-9.
- Pajic, B. (2019). Our Forgotten Volunteers: Australians and New Zealanders with Serbs in World War One. Australian Scholarly Publishing. ISBN 978-1-9258-0144-6.
- Perović, M. (1971). The Toplica rebellion of 1917. Biblioteka Posebna izdanja (in Serbian). Slovo ljubve.
- Milovan Pisarri (2013). "Bulgarian crimes against civilians in occupied Serbia during the First World War". Balcanica (44): 357–390. doi:10.2298/BALC1344357P.
- Pisarri (2011). "Suppressing Toplica Uprising: VMRO as Leading Force of Repression". Vojnoistorijski Glasnik (in Serbian) (2). Institut za strategijska istraživanja: 28–49.
- Reiss, Rodolphe Archibald (2018) [1919]. The Kingdom of Serbia. Infringements of the Rules and Laws of War Committed by the Austro-Bulgaro-Germans. FCT Press. ISBN 978-0-3530-6558-1.
- Report Responsibility Authors of the War (1919). Report of the Commission on the Responsibility of the Authors of the War.
- Report Inter-Allied Commission Macedonia (1919). Report of the Inter-Allied Commission in Eastern Macedonia.
- Rossos, A. (2013). Macedonia and the Macedonians: A History. Hoover Institution Press Publication. Hoover Institution Press. ISBN 978-0-8179-4883-2.
- Southeastern Europe (1980). L'Europe Du Sud-Est. Vol. 7–9. Arizona State University.
- Stojcev, Aleksandar (2018-06-05). "Македонија и Македонците во Првата светска војна 1914–1918" [Macedonia and Macedonians in World War I 1914–1918] (in Macedonian). Ministry of Defense of the Republic of Macedonia; Military Museum of the Republic of Macedonia. p. 155 – via Academia.edu.
- Trbić, V.; Drašković, A.; Ristevski, S.; Janković, S. (1996). Memoirs: narrations and experiences of the Vojvoda of Veles (in Serbian). Vol. 1. Kultura. ISBN 978-8-6780-1013-2.
- Tucker, Spencer (2002). The Great War, 1914-1918. Taylor & Francis. ISBN 978-0-2031-3755-0.
- Yeftich, Paul (2018). Tragedy of a Nation (Classic Reprint). Fb&c Limited. ISBN 978-0-2676-3934-2.
- History of the United Nations War Crimes Commission and the Development of the Laws of War. H.M. Stationery Office. 1948.
