= Sinac =

- Village
- Interactive map of Sinac
- Country: Croatia
- County: Lika-Senj County

Area
  - Total: 14.4 sq mi (37.4 km^{2})
- Elevation: 1,480 ft (450 m)

Population (2021)
  - Total: 498
- Time zone: UTC+1 (CET)
  - Summer (DST): UTC+2 (CEST)

Sinac is a village near Otočac, Croatia. In the 2011 census, it had 563 inhabitants. in the 2021 census it had 498 inhabitants

== Geography ==
It has an elevation of about 450 meters and a total area of about 37.4 kilometers^{2} above sea level and is located southeast of Otočac.

== History ==
In July 2023, a monument to the people of Sinca who died in the Homeland War was unveiled in the town: Mate Laškarin died in 1991 in Drenovo Klanac as a member of the MUP reserve, Zoran Dubravčić in 1992 in Otočac as a member of the 2nd Battalion, 133rd Brigade of the HV, Milan Mravinac in 1993 in Sinac as a member of the Sinac ZNG Company, Božo Tonković in 1994 in Udol Sinac as a member of the Artillery-Rocket Division of the 133rd Brigade, and in the same unit was Zvonko Dubravčić, who was killed on August 4, 1995 in Sinac. . .

== Demographics and Population by Year ==
- 2021 – 489
- 2011 – 563
- 2001 – 630
- 1991 – 1041 (Croats - 1037, Others - 4)
- 1981 – 1044 (Croats - 1037, Yugoslavs - 3, Serbs - 1, Others - 3)
- 1971 – 1142 (Croats - 1135, Serbs - 4, Others - 3)

== Famous people ==
- Mate Šepo Nikšić, folk poet
- Josip Sarkotić
- Stjepan Sarkotić, Croatian general of the Austro-Hungarian army
