= Royal Croatian Home Guard =

Austro-Hungarian military unit (1868–1918)

Kraljevsko hrvatsko domobranstvo Royal Croatian Home Guard
- Home Guard Coat of Arms
- Active: 1868–1918
- Country: Kingdom of Croatia-Slavonia; Austria-Hungary
- Branch: Common Army
- Mottos: Za kralja i Domovinu (For King and Homeland)
- Engagements: World War I

Commanders
- Notable commanders: Svetozar Boroević; Stjepan Sarkotić

The Royal Croatian Home Guard (Croatian: Kraljevsko hrvatsko domobranstvo, Hrvatsko-slavonsko domobranstvo or Kraljevsko hrvatsko-ugarsko domobranstvo, often simply Domobranstvo or Domobran in singular, in German: Croatisch-Slawonische Landwehr) was the Croatian-Slavonian army section of the Royal Hungarian Landwehr (Hungarian: Magyar Királyi Honvédség), which existed from 1868 to 1918. The force was created by decree of the Croatian Parliament on December 5, 1868, as a result of the Croatian–Hungarian Settlement.

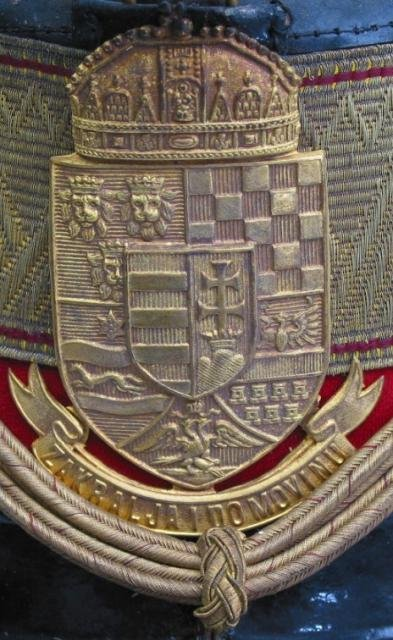
Home Guard Cap Badge

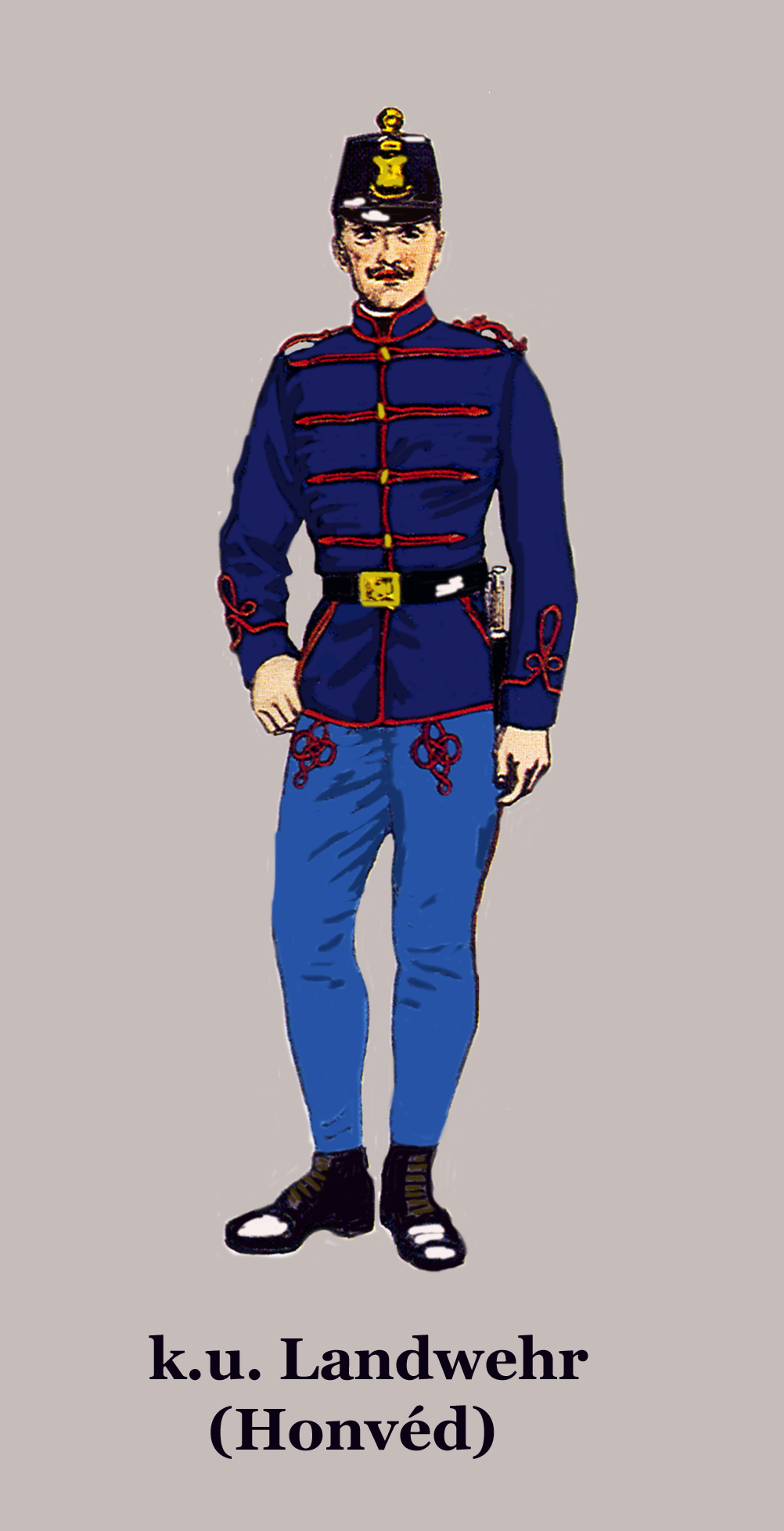
Uniform of the Hungarian Honvéd

The settlement specified four conditions:

1. Croats would serve their military service within Croatia
2. Military training would be conducted in Croatian
3. Cadet and Domobran academies would be formed
4. Croatian military units could take on Croatian names

== Formations and units ==
The Home Guard initially consisted of 8 squadrons, garrisoned in 6 town:

- 79th Home Guard Squadron (Varaždin)
- 80th Home Guard Squadron (Zagreb)
- 81st Home Guard Squadron (Virovitica)
- 82nd Home Guard Squadron (Vukovar)
- 29th Home Guard Squadron (Varaždin)
- 30th Home Guard Squadron (Varaždin)
- 31st Home Guard Squadron (Vinkovci)
- 32nd Home Guard Squadron (Vinkovci)

Following a reform, it was reorganized into 8 battalions each garrisoned in a different town:

- 83rd Home Guard Battalion (Sisak)
- 84th Home Guard Battalion (Bjelovar)
- 87th Home Guard Battalion (Gospić)
- 88th Home Guard Battalion (Ogulin)
- 89th Home Guard Battalion (Švarča)
- 90th Home Guard Battalion (Glina)
- 91st Home Guard Battalion (Nova Gradiška)
- 92nd Home Guard Battalion (Mitrovica)

Following a second reform, it was reorganized into 5 regiments, each in 5 major cities:

- 25th Home Guard Infantry Regiment (Zagreb)
  - Josip Broz Tito served in this regiment (German: k.u. Honvéd-Infanterieregiment Nr. 25).
- 26th Home Guard Infantry Regiment (Karlovac)
- 27th Home Guard Infantry Regiment (Sisak)
- 28th Home Guard Infantry Regiment (Osijek)
- 10th Home Guard Cavalry Regiment (Varaždin)

== Commanders ==
No.	Portrait	Name	Tenure
1		Count Miroslav Kulmer	1869–1875
2		Dragutin Višnić	1875–1880
3		Milan (Emil) Musulin	1881–1890
4		Matija Raslić	1890–1893
5		Eduard Lukinac	1893–1897
6		Josip Bach	1897–1901
7		Ðuro Ćanić	1901–1903
8		Radoslav Gerba	1903–1907
9		Svetozar Boroević	1907–1912
10		Stjepan Sarkotić	1912–1914
11		Ivan Salis Seewis	1915
12		Anton Lipošćak	1915–1916, 1917
13		Luka Šnjarić	1916–1917
14		Mihael Mihaljević	1917–1918
15		Teodor Soretić	1918

== World War I ==
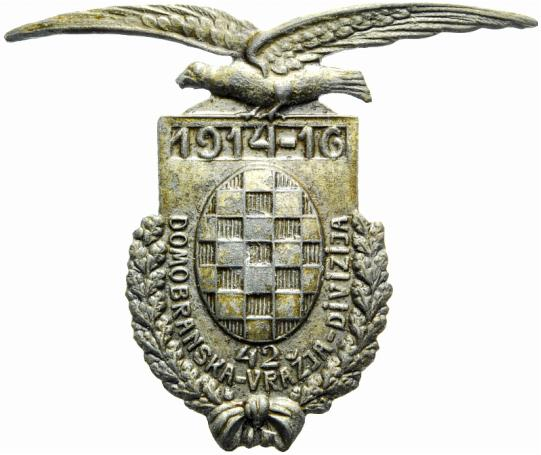
Badge of the 42nd Home Guard Infantry Division.

In August 1914, the 42nd Home Guard Infantry Division consisting of the 25th, 26th, 27th and 28th Home Guard Infantry regiment under the command of Stjepan Sarkotić took part in the Serbian campaign, together with the 104th Landsturm (pučko-ustaška) Brigade under the command of Theodor Bekić. In late 1918, elements of various Royal Croatian Home Guard regiments took part in occupation of Međimurje.

== Legacy ==
During World War II, the Independent State of Croatia was formed and its regular army was also called the "Croatian Home Guard". It existed from April 1941 to May 1945.

On 24 December 1991, during the Croatian War of Independence, a part of the Croatian Army was formed that was also called the "Home Guard" ("Domobranstvo"). It ceased to exist in a 2003 reorganization.

== See also ==
- Austro-Hungarian Armed Forces
- 1918 protest in Zagreb
