= Balkanstreitkräfte =

Austro-Hungarian army deployed against Serbia in World War I

Imperial and Royal Balkan Armed Forces
- k.u.k. Balkanstreitkräfte
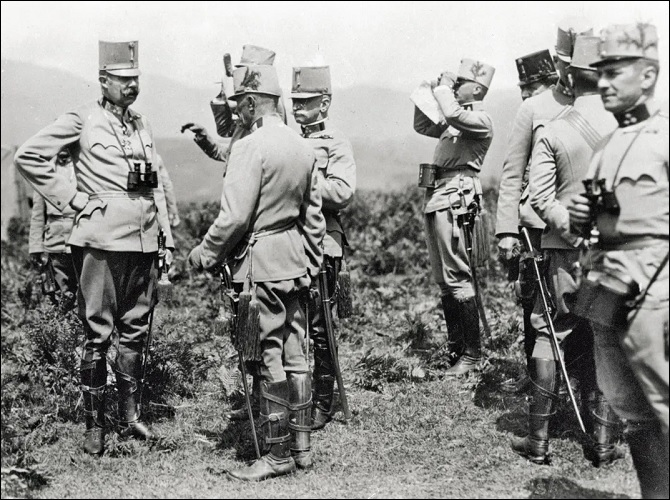
- Austro-Hungarian officers c. 1914
- Founded: August 1914
- Disbanded: 27 May 1915
- Allegiance: Austria-Hungary
- Branch: Austro-Hungarian Army
- Type: Army Group
- Role: Offensive operations
- Size: 450,000 men (Note: Peak strength Summer 1914)
- Part of: Austro-Hungarian Armed Forces
- Garrison/HQ: Sarajevo; Condominium of Bosnia and Herzegovina
- Nickname(s): Balkan Army
- Engagements: World War I; Serbian campaign (1914)

Commanders
- Notable commanders: Oskar Potiorek; Archduke Eugen

The Balkanstreitkräfte (German for "Balkan Armed Forces"), also known as the Balkan Army, was a military formation of the Austro-Hungarian Army created for operations against the Kingdom of Serbia at the onset of World War I.

Formed in August 1914, the force participated in three unsuccessful invasions of Serbia, culminating in a decisive defeat at the Battle of Kolubara in December of that year. Following this failure, its commander, Feldzeugmeister Oskar Potiorek, was dismissed. The Balkanstreitkräfte was officially disbanded in May 1915, with its remaining elements, notably the 5th Army, reorganized under Archduke Eugen of Austria and redeployed to the Italian front.

== Formation and Organisation ==
The Balkanstreitkräfte was formed on 7 August 1914 following the consolidation of Minimalgruppe Balkan (Balkan Minimal Group) and B-Staffel (B-Contingent). Minimalgruppe Balkan was composed of the Fifth and Sixth armies, designated for operations against the Serbia and Montenegro. B-Staffel, a reserve force renamed the Second Army, was initially held in reserve to support Minimalgruppe Balkan or to be deployed against the Russians in Galicia. In total, seven of the sixteen Austro-Hungarian Army corps were assigned to the Serbian campaign. The forces allocated to the Balkan front consisted of four corps from B-Staffel and three corps from Minimalgruppe Balkan, comprising a total of nineteen infantry divisions.

On 28 July 1914, Austria-Hungary declared war on Serbia. In response, Franz Conrad von Hötzendorf, Chief of the Austro-Hungarian General Staff, ordered both Minimalgruppe Balkan and B-Staffel to advance south. The force was subsequently reinforced to a total of twenty-six divisions following the reassignment of III Corps from A-Staffel to B-Staffel. At this stage, the units deployed against Serbia represented approximately half of the Austro-Hungarian military strength.

The Balkan Army was placed under the command of Oskar Potiorek, the military governor of Bosnia and Herzegovina. (Note: Potiorek had been responsible for the security of Archduke Franz Ferdinand of Austria and Duchess Sophie of Hohenberg at the time of their assassination in Sarajevo on 28 June 1914.) His appointment was made by Conrad von Hötzendorf, who also entrusted him with direct command of the 6th Army.

=== Order of Battle ===
Organisation of the Balkanstreitkräfte as of 7 August 1914

Minimalgruppe Balkan	B-Staffel
5th Army – Liborius Ritter von Frank; VIII Corps (Prag); 9th Inf.; 21st Landwehr Divs.; XIII Corps (Agram); 36th Inf.; 42nd Domobranstvo Divs.; 6th Army – Oskar Potiorek; XV Corps (Sarajevo); 1st Inf. Divs.; 48th Landwehr Divs.; XVI Corps (Ragusa); 18th Inf. Div.	2nd Army – Eduard von Böhm-Ermolli; IV Corps (Budapest); 31st Inf.; 32nd Inf.; 5th Huszar Divs.; VII Corps (Temesvár); 17th Inf. Divs.; 34th Inf. Divs.; IX Corps (Leitmeritz); 29th Inf. Division

== Operational history ==
=== Serbia ===
At the outset of the Serbian Campaign in August 1914, the Balkanstreitkräfte fielded a total of 319½ infantry battalions, amounting to approximately 320,000 rifles, supported by sixty cavalry squadrons, 744 artillery pieces, 48 aircraft, and 486 machine guns. In contrast, Serbia's operational army comprised 250,000 troops but was inadequately equipped, possessing only 200 machine guns, three aircraft, and 180,000 modern rifles. The 6th Army, comprising the XV and XVI Corps, was positioned along the upper River Drina. The 5th Army, which included the VIII and XIII Corps, was positioned along the Drina valley to the River Sava at Zvornik. Further north, the 2nd Army, incorporating the IV and IX Corps, was stationed along the Sava River, directly facing Serbia. Additionally, the independent VII Corps was assigned on the eastern flank near Pancsova (Pančevo).

==== Initial Operations and First Invasion ====
The Austro-Hungarian invasion plan called for a coordinated offensive, with the 5th and 6th Armies advancing from the west, while elements of the 2nd Army penetrated from the northwest. This manoeuvre was intended to encircle Serbian forces and achieve a swift and decisive victory. Hostilities commenced on 28 July with the Bombardment of Belgrade (1914), followed by the first Austro-Hungarian invasion on 12 August. On 18 August, the 2nd Army, excluding the 8th Corps, was redeployed to the Battle of Galicia to counter the Russian Army. This left the 5th Army, unprepared for mountain warfare, struggling to cross the Drina River and maintain coordination with the 6th Army to the south. Meanwhile, the Serbian Army, well-prepared for defensive operations, successfully drew the Austro-Hungarian forces into Serbia, engaging them separately. This culminated in the Serbian victory at the Battle of Cer on 20 August. By the end of summer 1914, all Austro-Hungarian forces had withdrawn from Serbian territory, marking the first Allied victory of the war.

==== Second Invasion and the Battle of the Drina ====
On 8 September, Potiorek launched a second invasion, aiming to capture Belgrade. However, the offensive stalled at the Battle of the Drina, where the 5th Army was repelled and forced to retreat into Bosnia. Simultaneously, the 6th Army, facing the threat of encirclement by Serbian and Montenegrin forces, withdrew on 25 September.

==== Valjevo Offensive and the Battle of Kolubara ====
A renewed offensive began on 24 October, with Austro-Hungarian forces making significant gains in northern Serbia. By early November, their superior artillery forced the Serbian Army to retreat. On 2 December, the 5th Army successfully captured Belgrade. However, shortly thereafter, a Serbian counteroffensive at the Battle of Kolubara forced the 6th Army into a disorganised retreat towards Syrmia. The Serbian Army then turned its attention to the 5th Army, driving it back into western Banat. Faced with potential annihilation, the Balkanstreitkräfte was compelled to withdraw from Serbia entirely, abandoning Belgrade, which Serbian forces recaptured on 15 December.

== Disbandment ==
By the end of December 1914, losses sustained by the Balkanstreitkräfte amounted to 274,000 personnel, including nearly 30,000 killed, over 122,000 wounded, and 75,000 missing or captured. (Note: The Serbian Army suffered 163,000 casualties, including 69,000 fatalities from combat and disease, as well as 19,000 taken prisoner.) The severity of these losses led to the dissolution of the 6th Army, with its remaining units integrated into the 5th Army. According to historian John R. Schindler, the failure to overcome the Serbian Army, a force largely composed of peasant soldiers, inflicted a severe blow to the self-confidence, pride, and prestige of the Habsburg Monarchy. On 17 December 1914, General Oskar Potiorek was relieved of his command and formally resigned a few days later. Command of the remaining 5th Army was assumed by General der Kavallerie Archduke Eugen. On 27 May 1915, the 5th Army was redeployed to the Isonzo front, marking the final dissolution of the Balkanstreitkräfte.

== Army Commanders ==
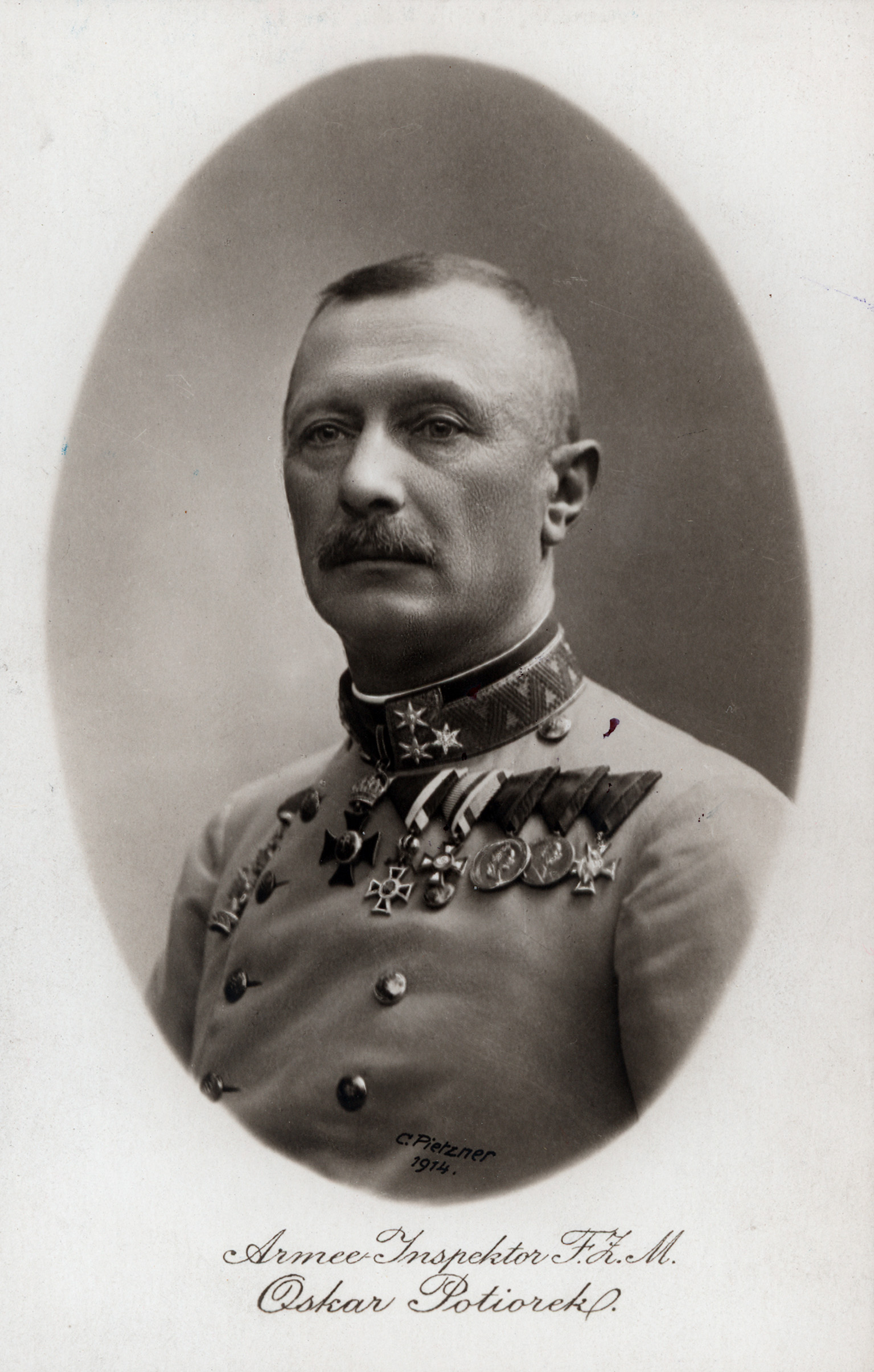
Feldzeugmeister Oskar Potiorek – Balkanstreitkräfte Supreme Commander,
Commander of the Sixth Army.

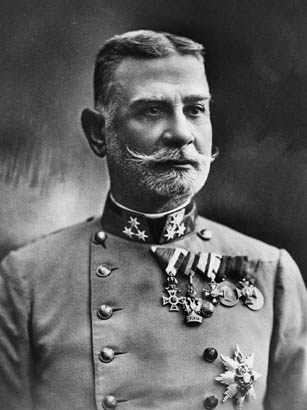
General Liborius Ritter von Frank – Commander of the Fifth Army.

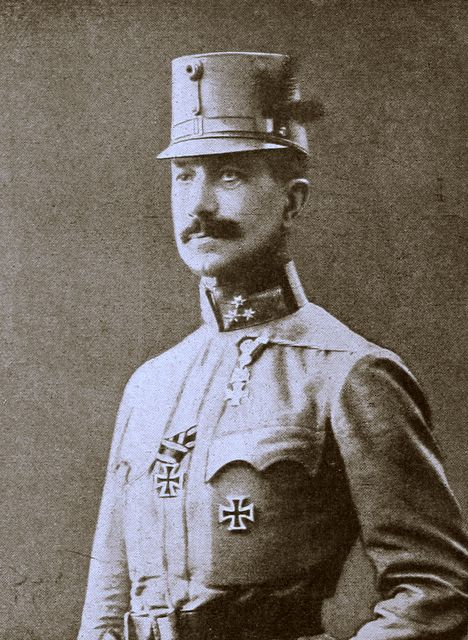
General Eduard von Böhm-Ermolli – Commander of the Second Army.

== See also ==
- Austro-Hungarian first occupation of Serbia

== Sources ==
- Bischof, G.; Karlhofer, F.; Williamson, S.R. (2014). 1914 Austria Hungary The Origins. University of New Orleans Press. ISBN 978-3-902936-35-6.
- Buttar, P. (2014). Collision of Empires: The War on the Eastern Front in 1914. Bloomsbury Publishing. ISBN 978-1-78200-971-9.
- Dredger, J.A. (2017). Tactics and Procurement in the Habsburg Military, 1866–1918: Offensive Spending. Springer International Publishing. ISBN 978-3-319-57678-7.
- DiNardo, R.L. (2015). Invasion: The Conquest of Serbia, 1915: The Conquest of Serbia, 1915. War, technology, and history. ABC-CLIO. ISBN 978-1-4408-0093-1.
- Herwig, H.H. (2014). The First World War: Germany and Austria-Hungary 1914-1918. Modern Wars. Bloomsbury Publishing. ISBN 978-1-4725-1081-5.
- Lyon, J. (2015). Serbia and the Balkan Front, 1914: The Outbreak of the Great War. Bloomsbury Academic. ISBN 978-1-4725-8003-0.
- Macdonald, J.; Cimpric, Ž. (2011). Caporetto and the Isonzo Campaign: The Italian Front, 1915–1918. Pen & Sword Books. ISBN 978-1-78159-930-3.
- Schindler, J.R. (2001). A Hopeless Struggle: The Austro-Hungarian Army and Total War, 1914-1918. Canadian theses. McMaster University. ISBN 978-0-612-05866-8.
- Sondhaus, L. (2011). World War One: The Global Revolution. Cambridge University Press. ISBN 978-0-521-51648-8.
- Thomas, N.; Babac, D.; Pavlovic, D. (2001). Armies in the Balkans 1914–18. Men-at-Arms. Bloomsbury USA. ISBN 978-1-84176-194-7.
- Watson, A. (2014). Ring of Steel: Germany and Austria-Hungary at War, 1914-1918. Penguin Books Limited. ISBN 978-0-14-192419-9.
