= Johann von Salis-Seewis =

Austro-Hungarian military officer (1862–1940)

General Johann von Salis-Seewis
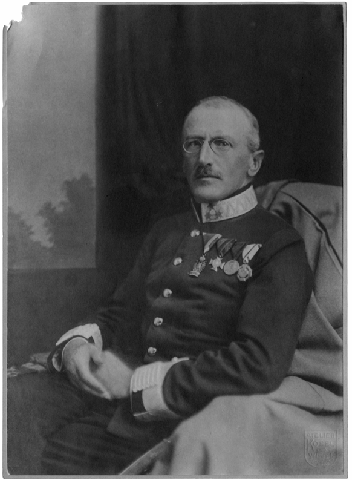
- Johann von Salis-Seewis
- Born: December 8, 1862; Karlovac, Kingdom of Croatia-Slavonia, Austria-Hungary (present-day Croatia)
- Died: October 24, 1940; Zagreb, Banovina of Croatia, Kingdom of Yugoslavia (present-day Croatia)
- Relatives: Johann Gaudenz von Salis-Seewis (great-grandfather)
- Military career
- Allegiance: Austria-Hungary
- Branch: Austro-Hungarian Armed Forces
- Service years: 1883–1918
- Rank: General of the Infantry
- Commands: 42nd Home Guard Infantry Division; 92nd Landwehr Infantry Division
- Conflicts: World War I: Balkans Front; Eastern Front

Military Governor of the Military General Governorate of Serbia
- In office 1 January 1916 – 6 July 1916
- Monarch: Franz Joseph I
- Succeeded by: Adolf von Rhemen

Johann von Salis-Seewis (8 December 1862 – 24 October 1940) was an Austro-Hungarian general who served during the First World War. Born in Karlovac, in the Kingdom of Croatia-Slavonia, he held senior commands in several theatres and was promoted to Feldzeugmeister in 1918.

He led the Croatian 42nd Home Guard Infantry Division, known as the "Devil's Division", in the First Serbian Campaign and on the Carpathian Front. He later commanded the garrison in Vienna and, from January to July 1916, served as the first military governor of the Military General Governorate of Serbia under Austro-Hungarian occupation. Subsequent commands included the 92nd Landwehr Infantry Division during the Romanian campaign and the Supreme Command of the occupying forces in Romania.

After the collapse of Austria-Hungary, Salis-Seewis retired to Croatia, where he received a state pension from the Yugoslav government. In later years he became involved with the Croatian fascist Ustaše movement. He died in Zagreb in 1940.

== Early life ==
Johann Ulrich Salis-Seewis was born in Karlovac, Croatia-Slavonia, on 8 December 1862. He was the third child of Gaudenz Gubert Comte Salis-Seewis (1824–1873), a member of the Swiss aristocracy whose family had been granted an earldom by King Louis XIV of France. (Note: On 14 March 1915, an official decree allowed Comte de Salis-Seewis and his descendants to use the title in German as "Graf von Salis-Seewis".) His mother, Wilhelmina (née Dobrinović), was from an old Croatian noble family originally from Bosnia. His great-grandfather was the Swiss poet Johann Gaudenz von Salis-Seewis. Salis-Seewis' father died when he was eleven.

== Early military career ==
After graduating from military school, Salis-Seewis was posted as a military adviser to Skopje during unrest in Macedonia, where insurgents from several ethnic groups clashed with the Ottoman forces. From 1903 to 1905 he commanded the Turkish gendarmerie. He later served with the 86th Infantry Regiment in Budapest and the 76th Infantry Regiment in Esztergom, before commanding the 79th Infantry Regiment from 1908 to 1911. In 1911 he took command of the 71st Infantry Brigade based in Rijeka, and was promoted to major general on 9 May 1912.

== First World War service ==
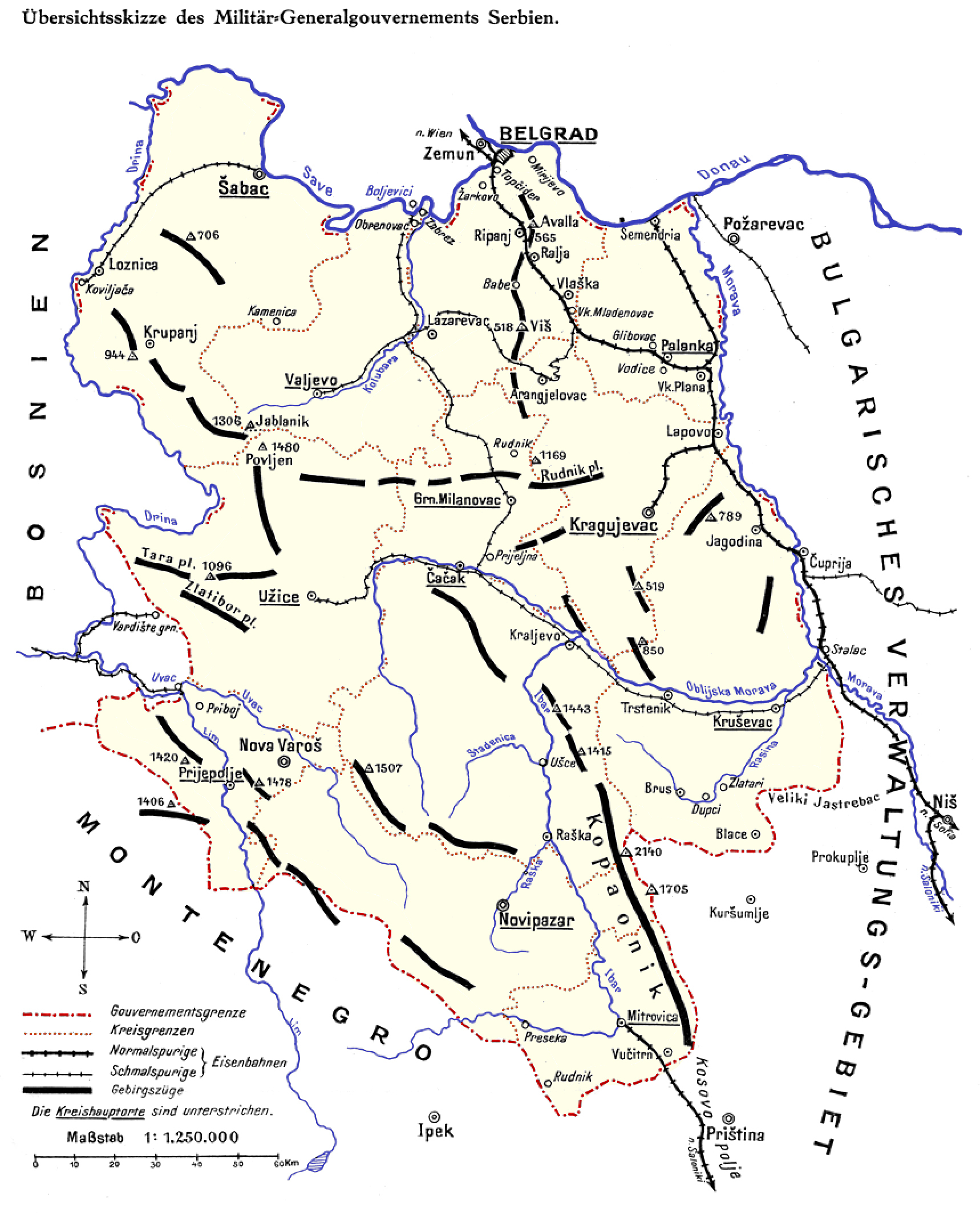
Territory of the Austro-Hungarian Military Governorate of Serbia in 1916, during Salis-Seewis' tenure

At the outbreak of war, Salis-Seewis commanded the 71st Infantry Brigade in the failed Serbian campaign of 1914. In November he succeeded General Stjepan Sarkotić as commander of the 42nd Royal Landwehr (Honvéd) Infantry Division, known as the Vražija divizija ("Devil's Division"). This all-Croatian division was the only one designated Domobran (Home Guard), allowing orders to be issued in Croatian. Following the retreat from Serbia, the division was redeployed to Galicia and the Carpathian Front. Promoted to Lieutenant field marshal in February 1915, Salis-Seewis remained in command until June, when he was replaced by General Karl von Pflanzer-Baltin for unsatisfactory performance. In November 1915 he was appointed commander of the Vienna garrison.

On 7 January 1916, after the occupation of Serbia by the Central Powers, Emperor Franz Joseph I appointed him military governor of the Military General Governorate of Serbia. The governorate covered 83,800 km² with a population of over 1.5 million, divided into three command areas, 12 districts and 57 subdistricts. Administration was conducted in German, Hungarian and local languages, under both civilian and military oversight. His duties included restoring order, supervising the railways, and suppressing unrest. His chief of staff was Lieutenant Colonel Otto Gellinek. Hungarian authorities considered him too lenient towards the Serbian population, and Prime Minister István Tisza judged his administration politically and economically inadequate. Amid growing criticism, he was dismissed in July 1916 and replaced by General Adolf von Rhemen.

Salis-Seewis was then given command of the 92nd Infantry Division in Moldavia during the Romanian campaign. While heading the Generalkommando Rumänien (Supreme Command of the Armed Forces of Romania), he clashed with Field Marshal von Mackensen, military governor of occupied Romania, over operational authority and rank protocol. His rigid insistence on Austro-Hungarian command prerogatives created friction in joint operations and led to his removal from field command in May 1918.

== Retirement and death ==
On 11 November 1918, weeks before the collapse of the monarchy, Salis-Seewis was promoted to Feldzeugmeister 2nd Class. After the war he settled in Croatia, receiving a state pension from the government of the Kingdom of the Serbs, Croats, and Slovenes. Historian John-Paul Newman records that he later became involved with the Croatian fascist Ustaše movement. He died in Zagreb on 24 October 1940.

== See also ==
- Johann Gaudenz von Salis-Seewis
- Royal Croatian Home Guard
- Military General Governorate of Serbia
