= Stjepan Sarkotić =

Austro-Hungarian Army generaloberst of Croatian descent

Baron Stjepan Sarkotić
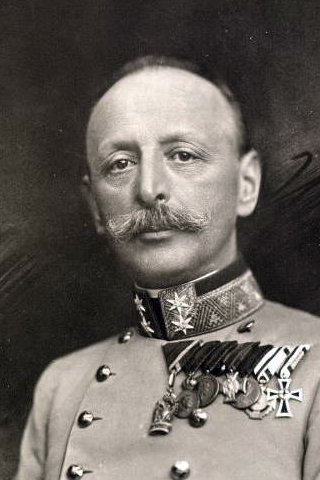
- Stjepan Sarkotić in a uniform of a lieutenant field marshal in 1915

9th Governor of Bosnia and Herzegovina
- In office 22 December 1914 – 3 November 1918
- Appointed by: Franz Joseph I of Austria
- Preceded by: Oskar Potiorek
- Succeeded by: Office abolished (Atanasije Šola as President of the People's Government of Bosnia and Herzegovina)

Personal details
- Born: 4 October 1858 Sinac, Croatia, Austrian Empire
- Died: 16 October 1939 (aged 81) Vienna, Nazi Germany
- Resting place: Zentralfriedhof, Simmering, Vienna, Austria
- Education: Theresian Military Academy
- Profession: Soldier
- Awards: Order of the Iron Crown; Order of Leopold

Military service
- Allegiance: Austria-Hungary
- Branch/service: Austro-Hungarian Army
- Years of service: 1884–1918
- Rank: Generaloberst
- Unit: Königgrätz Regiment; 16th Infantry Regiment; 1st Mountain Brigade; Intelligence Department of General Staff
- Commands: 7th Infantry Division; XII Corps; 5th Infantry Brigade; 88th Land Rifle Regiment; 44th Home Guard Infantry Division; VI. Royal Military District; 42nd Home Guard Infantry Division
- Battles/wars: World War I: Montenegrin campaign

Stjepan Freiherr Sarkotić von Lovćen (also Stjepan Sarkotić, or Stephan Sarkotić; 4 October 1858 – 16 October 1939) was an Austro-Hungarian Army generaloberst of Croatian descent who served as Governor of Bosnia and Herzegovina and military commander of Dalmatia and Montenegro during the First World War.

== Early life and education ==
Stjepan Sarkotić was born in Sinac near the Croatian town of Otočac on 4 October 1858 as one of four siblings. His father was Lieutenant Matija Sarkotić of the Otočac Border Regiment Nr.2. After he attended gymnasium in Senj, he entered in Military School in Sankt Pölten, and later he attended Theresian Military Academy in Wiener Neustadt.

== Military career ==
In 1884, he got his first military post in the Königgrätz Regiment, and later he was transferred to 16th Infantry Regiment in Trebinje, Herzegovina. In 1886, he was stationed in Mostar in the 1. Mountain Brigade. Until 1887, he was involved in military actions that occurred in Bosnia and Herzegovina and in Krivošije in Montenegro. By 1889, he was promoted to the rank of captain and assigned to the General Staff Corps in Vienna. He was hereafter assigned to obtain intelligence on foreign nations. To this end, he travelled abroad to Serbia, Bulgaria and Macedonia, Russian city Kazan, where he learned to speak Russian. After his return, he worked in Intelligence Service of General Staff, and after that he worked with troops in the field.

As soon as he became major, he was assigned to be commander of staff of the 7th Infantry Division in Osijek, where he remained for four years. After that, he was assigned to Regiment in Prague as lieutenant colonel. Between 1900 and 1903, he was chief of staff at the port city of Pula during which time he became colonel in 1901. After his service in Pula, he was assigned to be commander of the staff of XII Corps in Sibiu in Transilvania. In 1907, he became commander of the 5th Infantry Brigade in Linz, and in the same year he was promoted to major general. In 1908, he became commander of the 88th Lands Rifle Regiment, and in 1910, he was assigned to be a commander of 44th Home Guard Division. On 2 November 1911, he was promoted to feldmarschalleutnant. Emperor Franz Joseph appointed him to the nobility in 1908. On 10 April 1912 Sarkotić became general of the VI Royal Hungarian Honvéd District, succeeding his countryman Svetozar Boroević in this post. Sarkotić was also commander of the Home Guard of the Kingdom of Croatia-Slavonia with headquarters in Zagreb.

=== First World War ===
With the start of World War I, Sarkotić was one of the chief commanders of the Austrian-Hungarian forces on the Serbian campaign, commanding the 42nd Home Guard Infantry Division, an entirely Croat division known as Vrazija Divizija or "Devil's Division" which was part of the XII Corps.

==== Military governor of occupied Serbian territories ====
On 24 November 1914, after a third attempt, Austro-Hungarian troops finally captured Belgrade, General Sarkotić is appointed military governor of the occupied Serbian territory by Emperor Franz Joseph; General Johann von Salis-Seewis took over command of the 42nd Division. On 2 December, the Royal Serbian Army launched an unexpected sustained counterattack, decisively defeating the Austro-Hungarians at the Battle of Kolubara and recapturing Belgrade just a day after the establishment of Stjepan Sarkotic’s new military government, effectively ending his brief governorship and bringing the first Austro-Hungarian Serbian Campaign to an end.

==== Governor of Bosnia and Herzegovina ====
On 22 December 1914, he replaced as Governor of Bosnia and Herzegovina Oskar Potiorek who had been commander of the Balkanstreitkräfte (Balkan Armed Forces) during the failed campaign. He was decorated with Order of the Iron Crown 2nd Class. At the same time, he was named commander of 15th and 16th division, and promoted to the rank of a general of infantry. With this appointment, Sarkotić held both military and civil power in Bosnia and Herzegovina. As governor of Bosnia and Herzegovina he understood the need for reforms in the region by both Austria and Hungary due to what he saw as the danger of a Yugoslav state. Sarkotić formally dissolved the Diet of Bosnia in February 1915. The last time the Diet convened until then was 29 June 1914.

==== Montenegrin campaign ====
In 1916, Sarkotić commanded the Western wing of the campaign into Montenegro from the naval base in Kotor. His troops attacked the Montenegrin forces at Mount Lovćen. Within two days his forces took Lovćen and three days after that the Montenegrin capital, Cetinje, was also under their control. For the success of this operation, Sarkotić was awarded the Order of Leopold First Class with War Decoration and Swords and the Bronze Military Merit Medal with Swords. He was also made a Hungarian baron, accepting the style of von Lovćen, and was afterwards officially styled Stefan Baron Sarkotić von Lovćen at the Austrian court. Although his title of baron was Hungarian, Sarkotić was often referred to as Freiherr Sarkotić von Lovćen in German.

==== End of war ====
In 1917, he was promoted to Generaloberst (Colonel General). He continued at his position in Bosnia and Herzegovina until 1918. Sarkotić was strongly anti-Serbian and anti-Yugoslav. During his tenure as governor of Bosnia and Herzegovina he suggested the unification of Croatia-Slavonia with Dalmatia and Bosnia and Herzegovina. However, Austria-Hungary's political elite never took the threat of a South Slav state very seriously. István Tisza, Prime Minister of Hungary, suggested a plebiscite be held, but the actions were too little too late. On Sarkotić's recommendation Tisza met with Ivo Pilar and Josip Vancaš, anti-Yugoslav members of the Croat People's Union in the Diet of Bosnia and Herzegovina, during his visit to Sarajevo in September 1918.

After the defeat and the dissolution of the Dual Monarchy, Sarkotić was incarcerated by officials from the newly proclaimed Kingdom of Serbs, Croats and Slovenes, along with other conspirators, after it was found that he was trying to start an insurrection in the Yugoslav army. Sarkotić was held for ten days then released on the condition that he left Yugoslavia immediately.

== Emigration ==
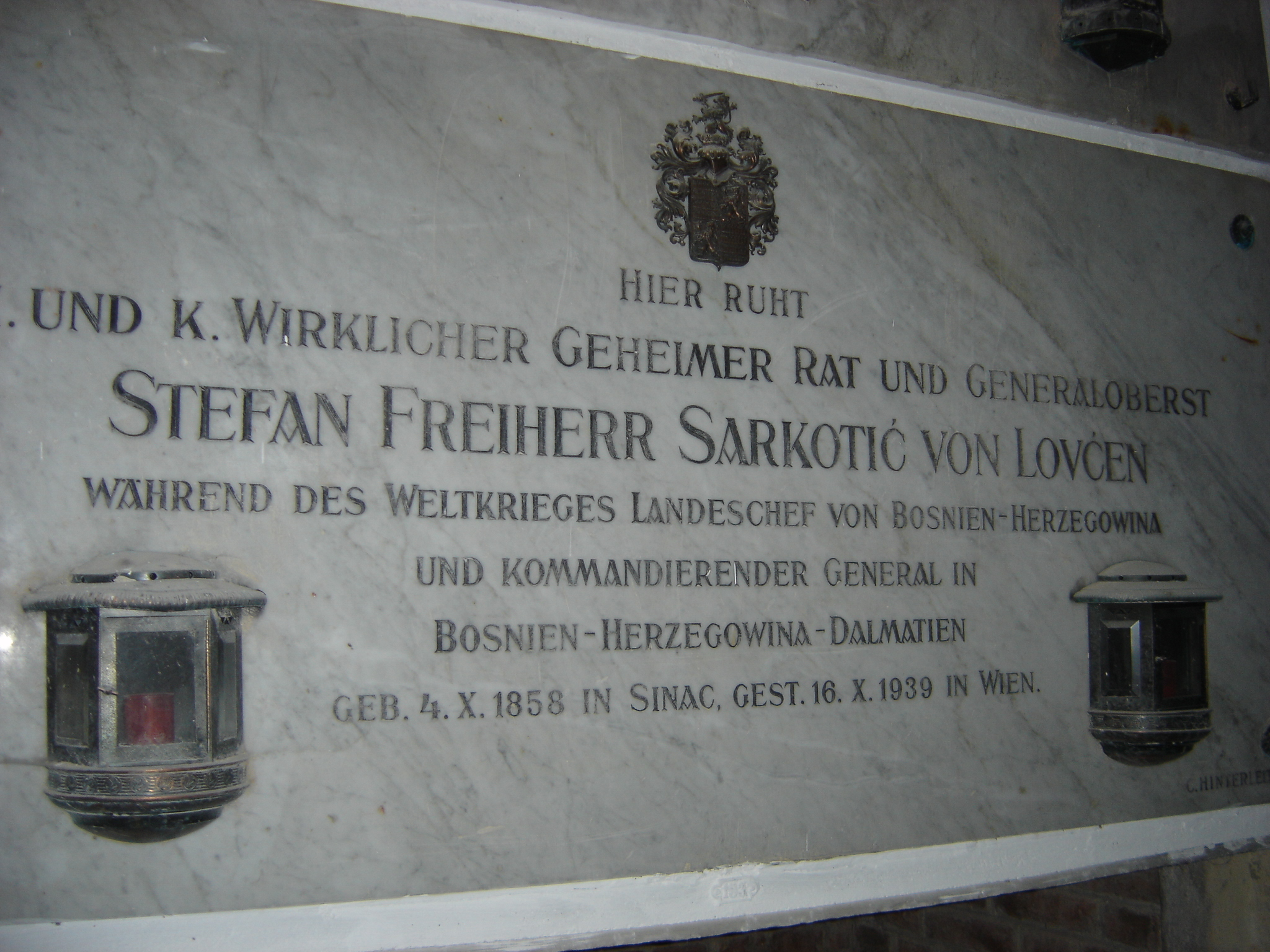
Sarkotić's tomb in Vienna

After his release, he returned to Vienna. Here he was involved with Croatian émigré groups. He frequently wrote against the ruling Serb Karađorđević dynasty in the Austrian Reichspost. He also formed and was head of a group known as the Croatian Committee. Even though at the beginning, Croat émigrés were united, they divided later into two groups, one being the legitimists, led by Sarkotić and Stephan Duić, and the republicans, led by Ivo Frank. The legitimists, mostly former Austrian-Hungarian officers, supported re-unification of Austria-Hungary. Sarkotić considered that Croats were endangered in Yugoslavia because of strong Serbian nationalism and huge influence of the Serbian Orthodox Church. However, since there were no sympathies for the old Austrian-Hungarian Monarchy amongst Croats, the Committee had little influence in Croatia.

In 1932, fascist Croat nationalist Ante Pavelić founded the Ustaša – Croatian Revolutionary Movement in Italy with an important base in Austria. Pavelić's terrorist organization overshadowed Sarkotić's Committee both numerically and with fanaticism, which led to eventual diminishing of Sarkotić's influence amongst the Croatian émigrés. On 9 October 1934, a joint Ustaše-IMRO conspiracy led to the assassination of King Alexander I of Yugoslavia. Sarkotić did not return to the land of his birth and died in Vienna in 1939.
