= 42nd Home Guard Infantry Division =

Austro-Hungarian Army formation

- 42. domobranska pješačka divizija
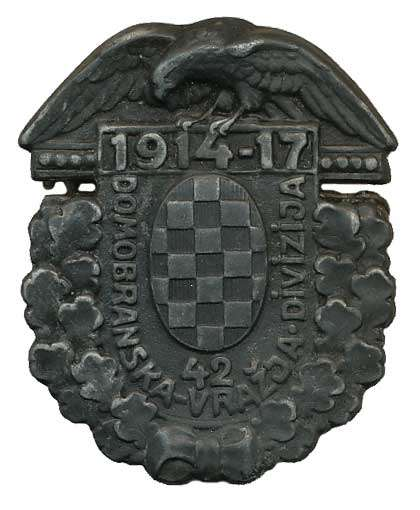
- Division insignia (1917)
- Active: 1914–1918
- Country: Kingdom of Croatia-Slavonia
- Allegiance: Austria-Hungary
- Branch: Austro-Hungarian Army (Royal Croatian Home Guard)
- Type: Infantry
- Role: Line infantry
- Size: Approx. 14,000 (peacetime strength)
- Part of: Austro-Hungarian Army
- Headquarters: Zagreb
- Nickname: The Devil's Division
- Engagements: World War I

Commanders
- Notable commanders: Johann Salis-Seewis; Stjepan Sarkotić

The 42nd Home Guard Infantry Division (Croatian: 42. domobranska pješačka divizija, also 42. Honved Inf. Division), nicknamed the Devil's Division (Vražja divizija), was an infantry division of the Royal Croatian Home Guard within the Austro-Hungarian Army during World War I. Composed primarily of Croatian troops, the division was deployed on multiple fronts, including Serbia, Galicia, the Russian front, and the Italian Front.

== Formation history ==
The 42nd Home Guard Infantry Division was an infantry division of the Royal Croatian Home Guard, part of the Austro-Hungarian Army. In Hungarian, it was referred to as Honvéd, and in German as Landwehr. While it carried the honorary designation Slavonski Domobrani (Slavonian Home Guard), its official title was the Devil's Division.

The division was formed shortly before the outbreak of World War I as part of the 7th Home Guard Croatia-Slavonia District of the Royal Croatian Home Guard. It consisted of approximately 14,000 troops in peacetime. As with other Austro-Hungarian Home Guard divisions, its units were recruited regionally. The 42nd Division included the 83rd Infantry Regiment, headquartered in Zagreb, which comprised the 25th Zagreb Infantry Regiment and the 26th Karlovac Infantry Regiment. The division was closely associated with the 36th Home Guard Infantry Division, another Croatian-manned unit.

Under the terms of the Second Ausgleich, an agreement between Hungary and the Kingdom of Croatia-Slavonia, Croatian units within the Honvéd, were granted specific privileges. These included the right to use Serbo-Croatian instead of Hungarian (Magyar) as the official language of command and service, the authorization to carry Croatian national colours, and the requirement to wear Croatian national insignia on their uniforms. Additionally, these provisions replaced earlier regulations that had mandated German or Hungarian as the primary languages of command.

== Operational history ==
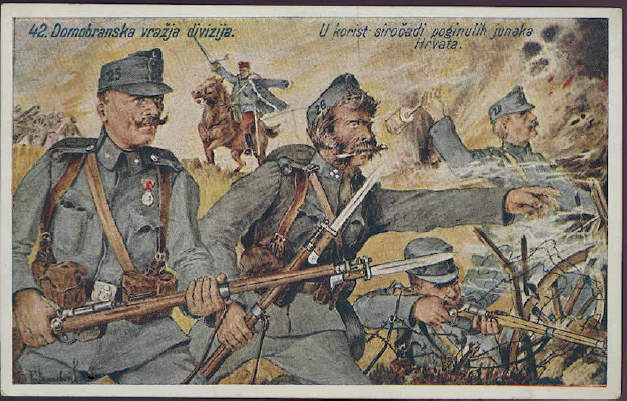
42nd Home Guard Devil's Division. Propaganda postcard printed in Zagreb. "For the benefit of orphans of fallen Croatian heroes" (1916).

At the start of war, the 42nd division was commanded by Stjepan Sarkotić, a Croatian officer from the former Military Border, born near Otočac.

The Division took part in the Serbian Campaign of 1914 as part of the XIII Corps, first in Syrmia, in Mačva, then during the seven-day battle for Šabac as well as the battles of Cer and Kolubara. Josip Broz Tito fought in its ranks and achieved promotion from corporal to staff sergeant (he later sought to conceal his involvement). The division was accused of war crimes, including rape, torture and murder, against the Serbian civilians of western Serbia. On November 11, 1914 Sarkotić was replaced by Johann von Salis-Seewis who led the division during the second Serbian offensive. After the failure of the campaign, it was redeployed at the beginning of 1915 in Galicia on the Eastern front along with the rest of the XIII. Corps. On 22 June 1915 Salis-Seewis was replaced by Anton Lipošćak before the Russian Empire launched the Brusilov offensive in January 1916. In February 1916, Luka Šnjarić took over from Lipošćak. On 25 June 1917 Mihovil Mihaljević assumed command of the division. At the beginning of 1918, the 42nd Division was transferred to the Italian battlefield, in June 1918, the command was taken over by Teodor Soretić, the division remained in Italy until the end of the war.

== Legacy ==
During World War II, after the 369th Croatian Reinforced Infantry Regiment, a unit of the Wehrmacht composed of Croat and Bosnian Muslim volunteers under a mostly German command, was annihilated during the battle of Stalingrad, it was reformed as the 369th Croatian Infantry Division with the nickname of Devil's Division in honour of the 42nd Home Guard Infantry Division of World War I.

== Commanders ==
- Stjepan Sarkotić – 1912 to 1914
- Johann Salis Seewis – 1915
- Anton Lipošćak – June 1915 to February 1916
- Luka Šnjarić – February 1916 to June 1917
- Mihovil Mihaljević – June 1917 to June 1918
- Teodor Soretić – from June 1918

== Sources ==
- Order of Battle – Serbia August, 1914
- Disposition Of The Austro-hungarian Army 1914–1918
- Lyon, J. (2015). Serbia and the Balkan Front, 1914: The Outbreak of the Great War. Bloomsbury Academic. ISBN 978-1-4725-8003-0.
- Oreskovich, J.R. (2019). The History of Lika, Croatia: Land of War and Warriors. Lulu Press, Incorporated. ISBN 978-0-359-86419-5.
- Schindler, J.R. (1995). A Hopeless Struggle: The Austro-Hungarian Army and Total War, 1914-1918. Canadian theses. McMaster University. ISBN 978-0-612-05866-8.
