= Austro-Hungarian occupation of Serbia =

1914–1918 military occupation

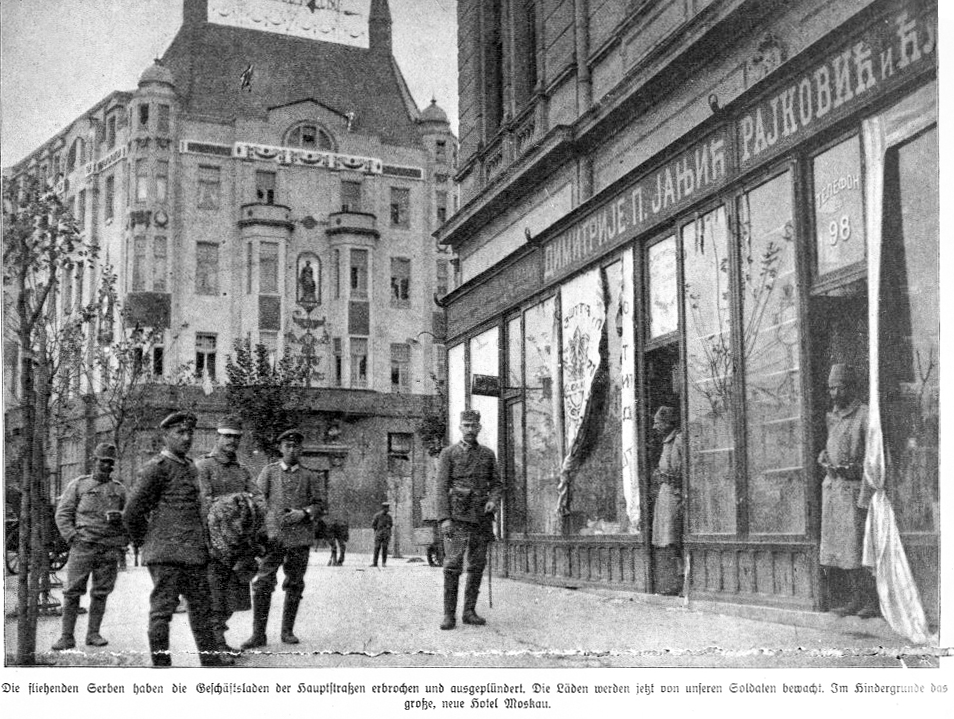
- Austro-Hungarian troops in the streets of Belgrade during the occupation
- Date: 1 January 1916 – 1 November 1918 (2 years, 10 months, 4 weeks and 1 day)
- Location: Territory of the Kingdom of Serbia west of the Morava Valley

The Austro-Hungarian Armed Forces occupied Serbia from late 1915 until the end of World War I. Austria-Hungary's declaration of war against Serbia on 28 July 1914 marked the beginning of the war. After three unsuccessful Austro-Hungarian offensives between August and December 1914, a combined Austro-Hungarian and German offensive breached the Serbian front from the north and west in October 1915, while Bulgaria attacked from the east. By January 1916, all of Serbia had been occupied by the Central Powers.

Serbia was divided into two separate occupation zones, an Austro-Hungarian and a Bulgarian zone, both governed under a military administration. Germany declined to directly annex any Serbian territory and instead took control of railways, mines, and forestry and agricultural resources in both occupied zones. The Austro-Hungarian occupation zone covered the northern three-quarters of Serbia. It was ruled by the Military General Governorate of Serbia (MGG/S), an administration established by the Austro-Hungarian Army on 1 January 1916 with a military governor at its head, seconded by a civil commissioner. Emperor Franz Joseph I appointed Johann von Salis-Seewis, an officer born in Croatia, as the first Military Governor General. The goal of the new administration was to denationalise the Serb population and turn the country into a territory from which to draw food and exploit economic resources.

In addition to a military legal system that banned all political organizations, forbade public assembly, and brought schools under its control, the Austro-Hungarian Army was allowed to impose martial law, practice hostage-taking, burn villages in punitive raids and respond to uprisings with public hangings and summary executions. During the occupation, over 50,000 Serbian civilians were deported to purpose-built internment and concentration camps in Austria-Hungary, most notably Mauthausen in Austria, Doboj in Bosnia, and Nagymegyer, Arad and Kecskemét in Hungary.

In September 1918, Allied forces, spearheaded by the Serbian Second Army and the Yugoslav Volunteer Division, broke through the Salonica front, leading to the surrender of Bulgaria on 30 September, followed by the quick liberation of Serbia and the retreat of all remaining Austro-Hungarian troops by the end of October. By 1 November 1918, all of pre-war Serbia had been liberated, bringing the occupation to an end.

== Background ==
On 28 June 1914, the heir to the Habsburg throne, Archduke Franz Ferdinand, was assassinated by Bosnian Serb student Gavrilo Princip in Sarajevo. The preservation of Austria-Hungary's prestige necessitated a punishing attack on Serbia, which the Austro-Hungarian leadership deemed responsible for the murder. The Austro-Hungarian military leadership was determined to quash Serbia's independence, which it viewed as an unacceptable threat to the future of the empire given its sizeable South Slavic population.

On 28 July 1914, exactly one month after Franz Ferdinand's assassination, Austria-Hungary declared war on Serbia. That evening, Austro-Hungarian artillery shelled the Serbian capital of Belgrade from the border town of Semlin (modern-day Zemun), effectively starting World War I. Command of the Austro-Hungarian invasion force was delegated to Feldzeugmeister Oskar Potiorek, the Governor-General of Bosnia and Herzegovina, who had been responsible for the security of Franz Ferdinand and his wife Duchess Sophie of Hohenberg in Sarajevo. On the morning of 12 August 1914, the Austro-Hungarian Fifth Army crossed the Drina River, effectively starting the first invasion of Serbia.

=== Punitive expedition and first occupation ===
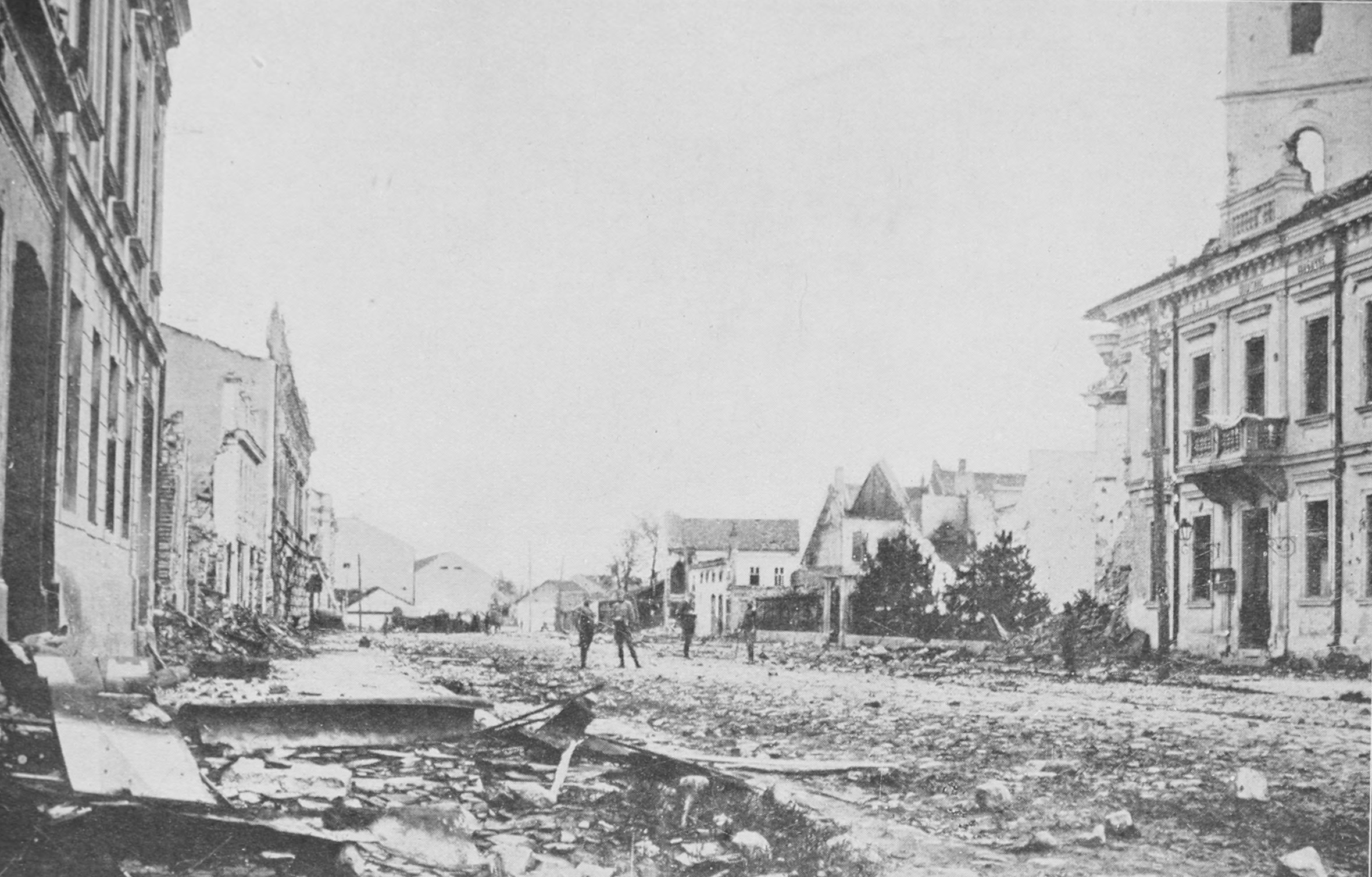
Šabac, pictured in August 1914, was the first target of the Austro-Hungarian punitive expedition and the site of many atrocities committed against the local population

During the first invasion of Serbia, which the Austro-Hungarian leadership euphemistically dubbed a punitive expedition (German: Strafexpedition), Austro-Hungarian forces occupied parts of Serbia for thirteen days. Their war aims were not only to eliminate Serbia as a threat but also to punish her for fuelling South Slav irredentism in the Monarchy. The occupation turned into a war of annihilation, accompanied by massacres of civilians and the taking of hostages. Austro-Hungarian troops committed a number of war crimes against the Serbian population, especially in the area of Mačva, where according to historian Geoffrey Wawro the Austro-Hungarian army savaged the civilian population in a wave of atrocities. During the short occupation between 3,500 and 4,000 Serb civilians were killed in executions and acts of random violence by marauding troops.

Mass killings took place in numerous towns in northern Serbia. On 17 August 1914, in the Serbian town of Šabac, 120 residents—mostly women, children and old men, who had previously been locked in a church—were shot and buried in the churchyard by Austro-Hungarian troops on the orders of Feldmarschall-Leutnant Kasimir von Lütgendorf. The remaining residents were beaten to death, hanged, stabbed, mutilated or burned alive. A pit was later discovered in the village of Lešnica containing 109 dead peasants who were "bound together with a rope and encircled by wire"; they had been shot and immediately buried, even with some still alive. Wawro writes that in Krupanj, men of the 42nd Home Guard Infantry Division, the exclusively Croat formation known as the Devil's Division, (Note: The 42nd Honvéd Devil's Division (Croatian: Vražija divizija) was the only unit designated as a Home Guard (Croatian: Domobran) division, with the right for officers to use Serbo-Croatian instead of German or Hungarian.) bashed a group of old men and boys to the ground using rifle buttstrokes and then hanged any who were still breathing.

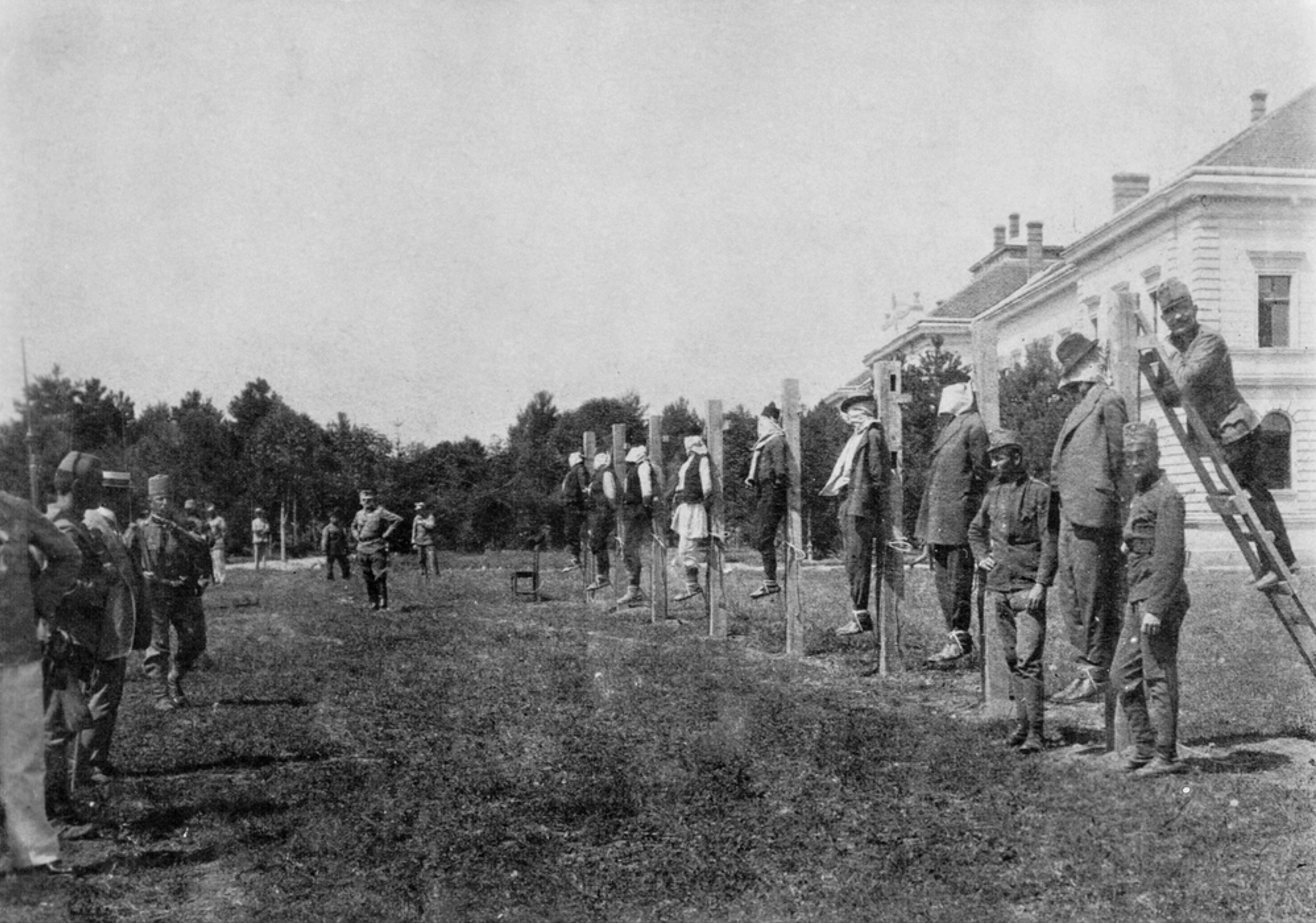
A picture postcard showing Serbs being executed by hanging in Kruševac as Austrian soldiers pose.

These types of attacks were planned at the highest level, the ground for the escalation of violence was ideologically prepared by the commanders' verbal radicalism, on August 13 Potiorek ordered reprisal hangings, the taking of hostages and arson by all units. Often bodies were left hanging on the gallows, trees or street lamps for days as a deterrent and as evidence of the Austro-Hungarian military's determination to deal with Serbian suspects. Many executions were photographed by Austro-Hungarian soldiers and officers; some of the images were reproduced as postcards and sold through the Austro-Hungarian army's official sales outlets. The Swiss criminologist and physician Archibald Reiss reported on the atrocities committed by the Austro-Hungarian army in a report that was presented at the Paris Peace Conference of 1919, Reiss recorded that the number of civilians killed in the invaded Serbian territory amounted to between 3,000 and 4,000, including a large number of women and children, in the region around Šabac he counted 1,658 burned buildings. According to historian James Lyon, "the Habsburg forces engaged in an orgy of looting, rape, murder, mass extermination, and other atrocities". Reiss likened the Austro-Hungarian atrocities to the Rape of Belgium.

American war correspondent John Reed, touring Serbia with Canadian artist Boardman Robinson, reported stories about the atrocities committed by Austrian soldiers against the civilian population "We saw the gutted Hôtel d’Europe, and the blackened and mutilated church in Šabac where three thousand men, women and children were penned up together without food or water for four days, and then divided into two groups – one sent to Austria as prisoners of war, the other driven ahead of the army as it marched south against the Serbians".

Austrian historian Anton Holzer wrote that the Austro-Hungarian army carried out "countless and systematic massacres…against the Serbian population. The soldiers invaded villages and rounded up unarmed men, women and children. They were either shot dead, bayoneted to death or hanged. The victims were locked into barns and burned alive. Women were sent up to the front lines and mass-raped. The inhabitants of whole villages were taken as hostages and humiliated and tortured." According to various sources, 30,000 Serbian civilians were executed during the first year of occupation alone.

On 24 August, after delivering a major defeat to Austria-Hungary's invading "Balkan Armed Forces" (German: Balkanstreitkräfte) at the Battle of Cer, the Royal Serbian Army liberated Šabac and reached the frontier banks of the Sava River, thereby bringing the first Austro-Hungarian invasion of Serbia to an end, and securing the first Allied victory of World War I.

==== Repulsed invasions and Serbian victory ====
On 8 September 1914 the Austro-Hungarians launched a second invasion, a twin-pronged night attack across the Drina to secure a firm bridgehead. This time engaging all their forces the well-equipped Habsburg forces outnumbered the Serbs who were short of munitions two to one. Facing fierce resistance, the Fifth Army was pushed back into Bosnia while the Sixth Army's offensive was stopped by a strong Serbian counterattack. On 23 October, the flagship of the Austro-Hungarian Danube Flotilla, the SMS Temes, which had shelled Belgrade on the first day of the war, was sunk by a mine on the Sava. Although it suffered nearly 30,000 casualties and the invasion was temporarily halted, the Austro-Hungarian army retained a foothold in Serbia. Convinced that Serbia was near defeat, Potiorek regrouped and launched a third offensive on 5 November 1914. Potiorek exploited the Austro-Hungarians' superiority in artillery, including large calibre mortar, to capture Valjevo on 15 November and with support from a monitor group of the Danube Flotilla as well as aerial reconnaissance, Belgrade on 30 November, forcing the Royal Serbian Army to retreat.

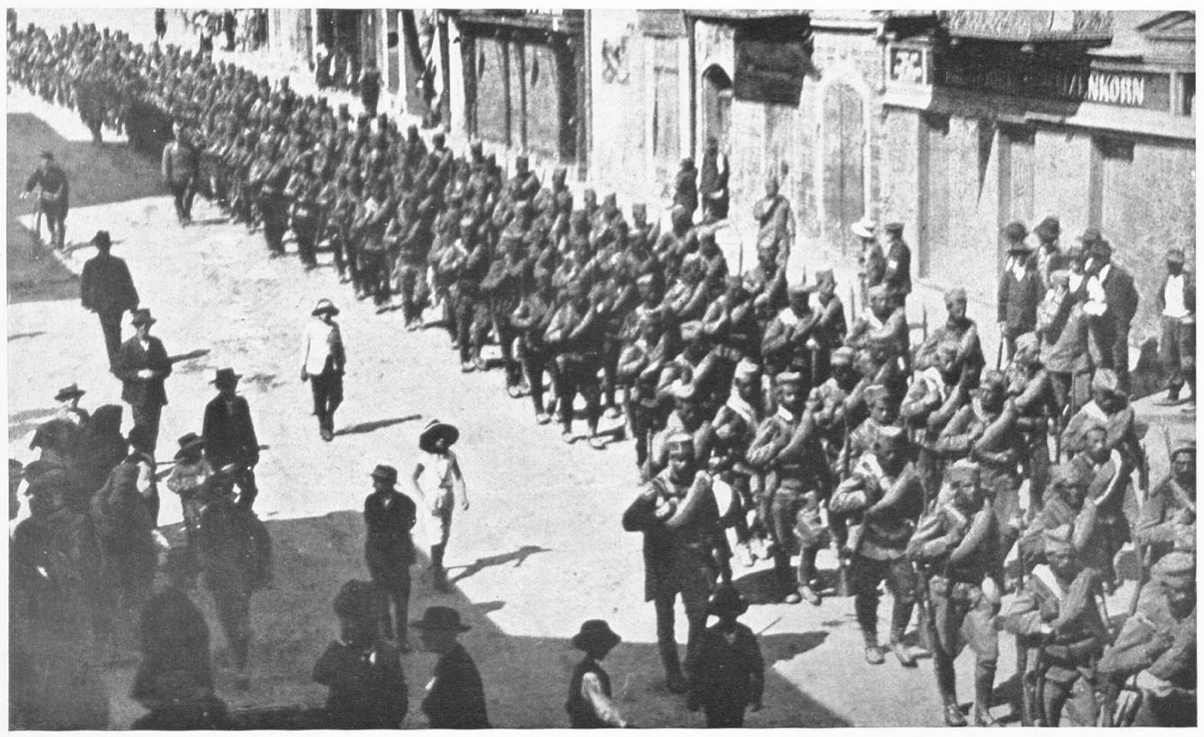
Serbian troops march through the Austro-Hungarian border town of Semlin (modern-day Zemun) in December 1914

The conquered territory was divided into five county commands (German: Etappenbezirkskommandos). The Austro-Hungarian Feldmarschall of Croatian ethnicity Stjepan Sarkotić, commander during the first invasion of the 42nd Home Guard Infantry Division, was appointed governor-general of Serbia by Emperor Franz Joseph on 24 November 1914. Under Sarkotić's administration, multiple concentration camps were established in which tens of thousands of Serbs were interned; in the town of Šabac alone, between 1,500 and 2,000 civilians were deported to internment camps in Hungary. According to the historian Bastian Matteo Scianna, the Austro-Hungarian atrocities had a planned exterminatory character.

In early December, the Royal Serbian Army launched a sustained counterattack, decisively defeating the Austro-Hungarians at the Battle of Kolubara and recapturing Belgrade a day after General Sarkotic's new military government had been established. By 15 December, the Royal Serbian Army had captured Zemun, having crossed the border in pursuit of the Austro-Hungarians. Defeat at the hands of Serbia, a small Balkan peasant kingdom, wounded the pride of Austria-Hungary's military and civilian leadership. One Austrian officer was reported as saying that Potiorek would be shot if he appeared among his own troops. On 22 December, Potiorek was relieved of his command and replaced by Archduke Eugen of Austria. Although Austria-Hungary had failed to defeat Serbia, the Royal Serbian Army had exhausted its military capability, losing 100,000 men in battle, and was forced to deal with a typhoid epidemic that further decimated the army and civilian population.

German officials urged their Austro-Hungarian counterparts to launch yet another offensive against Serbia, despite the fact that the Austro-Hungarians were engaged in a costly second front with Russia to the east. The Austro-Hungarian leadership would not consider invading Serbia again for almost a year, when Bulgarian participation in such an invasion was guaranteed.

=== Conquest of Serbia ===
On 6 September 1915, Germany and Bulgaria entered into a secret military alliance. German officials promised Bulgaria all of Serbian Macedonia, parts of northeastern Serbia, as well as a new loan of 200,000,000 gold francs in return for Bulgaria's participation in an upcoming invasion of Serbia. The agreement was signed in the German town of Plessa. The Central Powers enjoyed massive superiority in numbers and equipment, especially in artillery, along the nearly 1,000-kilometre (620 mi) front. Serbia and Montenegro could hardly muster half the number of soldiers as the Central Powers.

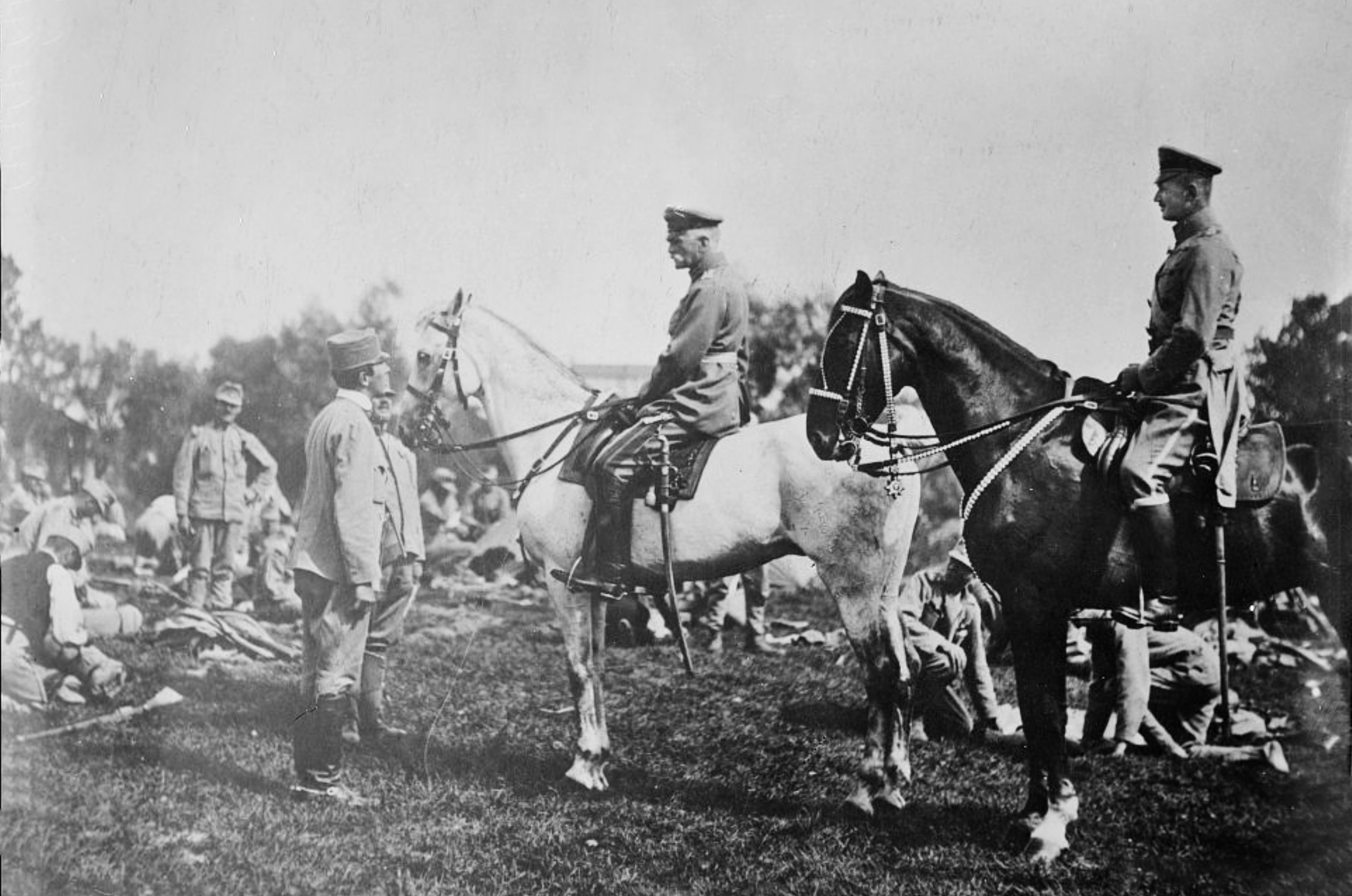
Generalfeldmarschall August von Mackensen visiting an Austro-Hungarian unit during the Serbian campaign.

On 5 October 1915, Austria-Hungary and Germany launched a joint invasion of Serbia. The offensive marked Austria-Hungary's fourth attempt to conquer Serbia, this time led by German General August von Mackensen. On that day, a heavy artillery bombardment from the border with Serbia began. The next day three German and three Austro-Hungarian Army corps crossed the Sava, attacking from the north as part of Army Group Mackensen. On 9 October, Belgrade, Serbia's capital, was evacuated, on the same day, Austrian forces entered the neighbouring and allied country of Montenegro. On 14 October, with the bulk of the Serbian forces opposing combined invaders up north, two Bulgarian armies invaded southern Serbia from the east, advancing towards Niš and Skoplje. On 21 October Skopje is occupied by Bulgarian troops effectively cutting off the Serbian Army's lines of communication to the south as well as a retreat route towards French General Maurice Sarrail's relief force, which had advanced northwards up the Vardar River valley from the Allies' new base in Salonica.

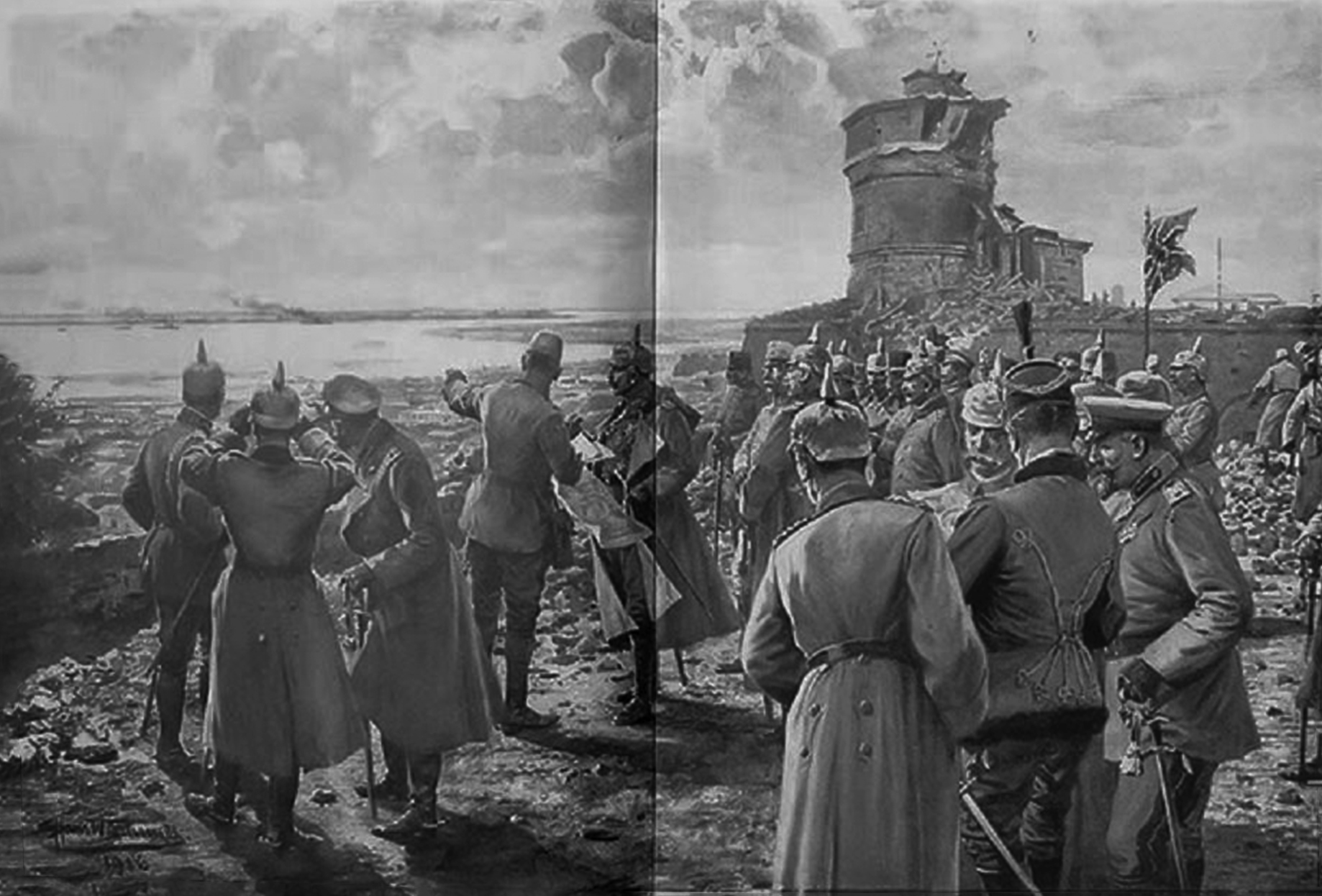
Kaiser Wilhelm II with German troops occupying the Kalemegdan Citadel of Belgrade.

Despite the treaty of mutual assistance with Serbia against a Bulgarian attack, King Constantine of Greece refused to let the Greek army enter the war to aid the Serbs or let the Allies use the Greek railroads devoted to supporting their mobilization. On 27 October, the Germans entered the town of Knjaževac, the entire Serbian government moved its headquarters from Niš to Kraljevo; on 2 November the Serbian government moved again this time from Kraljevo to Mitrovica in Kosovo. On 5 November, Niš was taken by the Bulgarians who had connected General Gallwitz's Eleventh German Army. Avoiding encirclement and the trap set up by Mackensen, the Serbian army withdrew to Kosovo, on 22 November Putnik ordered a retreat.

Within six weeks, Austria-Hungary, Bulgaria and Germany had succeeded in conquering Serbia. While the strategic goals set before the offensive had been achieved, the Central Powers were deprived of a decisive victory by the Royal Serbian Army's winter retreat over the mountains of Albania and Montenegro towards the Adriatic coast. Ultimately, around 140,000 Serbian soldiers and hundreds of thousands of civilians were evacuated to the Greek island of Corfu, among them the entire Serbian government, as well as the Serbian royal family.

The Royal Serbian Army retrenched itself in Greece, where it was reorganised and repurposed to combating Bulgarian and German troops on the Salonica front. Towards the end of 1915, Serbia was divided between Austria-Hungary and Bulgaria, with both countries establishing military administrations in the territories they had occupied.

== Administration and governance ==
Shortly after the retreat of the Royal Serbian Army, the country was divided into three zones. The Austro-Hungarian occupational zone stretched from the region west of the Morava Valley to the Macedonian frontier, and included Belgrade. Bulgaria gained the whole of Serbian Macedonia, as well as the areas east of the Morava, and Southern Serbia between Kosovo and the Danube River. A German control zone was established in the area east of the Velika Morava, the Južna Morava in Kosovo and the Vardar Valley. The Germans took control of all railways, mines, forestry, and agricultural resources in Serbia.

The Military General Governorate of Serbia and its districts.

On 1 January 1916, the Austro-Hungarian High Command (German: Armeeoberkommando; AOK) ordered the formation of the Military General Governorate of Serbia (German: Militärgeneralgouvernement in Serbien; MGG/S), with Belgrade as its administrative centre. The Austro-Hungarian occupation zone was divided into thirteen approximately equal districts (German: Kreise), which were then divided into sixty-four boroughs (German: Bezirke), with the city of Belgrade as its own district. The occupational administration was subordinate to the AOK under General Franz Conrad von Hötzendorf, and later under Generaloberst Arthur Arz von Straußenburg. The Military Governorate was headed by a General Governor with the rank of a corps commander.

The first governor-general, Johann Graf Salis-Seewis, an ethnic Croat with experience fighting insurgents in Macedonia, had served as the commander of the 42nd Devil's Division after Sarkotić. Salis-Seewis was appointed to the position in late 1915 by Emperor Franz Joseph, officially taking office on 1 January 1916. The historian and Balkan specialist Lajos Thallóczy was appointed as the Military General Governorate's civilian commissioner, as well as Salis-Seewis's deputy. Thallóczy arrived in Belgrade on 17 January 1916.

With the Austrians in charge of the military, the civilian administration was mostly made up of Hungarians and Croats. Four administrative departments were set up: military, economic, judicial, and political, with the latter, which had its own intelligence and police forces, under former Devil's Division officer and future Ustaše (Note: Both Sarkotić and Salis-Seewis joined the ranks of the fascist, Croatian nationalist Ustaše movement in the 1930s.) leader Major Slavko Kvaternik. Military intelligence (German: Nachrichtenabteilung) for the occupation zone was entrusted to Croat Lujo Šafranek-Kavić, as the Austro-Hungarian army relied considerably on South Slav officers and Bosnian Muslims knowledge of the language for intelligence purposes.

In December 1916, Thallóczy was killed in a train crash while returning from Vienna to Belgrade. In January 1917, Teodor Kušević, a high-ranking functionary from Bosnia and Herzegovina, was appointed to replace him as the civilian commissioner. The function was given more prominence with new areas of responsibility including trade, police, religion, education, justice and finance.

== System of occupation ==
=== Rule of law ===
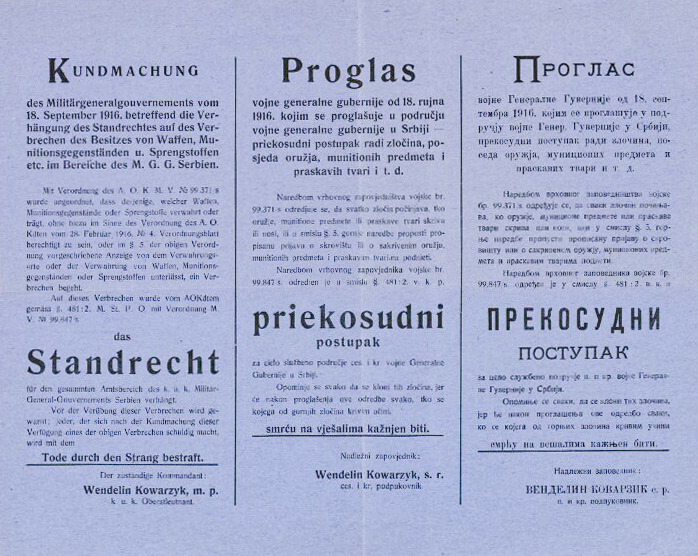
A poster dated 18 September 1916 announcing the implementation of martial law in occupied Serbia. The sentence for possession of a weapon is death by hanging.

The first measure of the occupiers was to establish a new legal system to secure order, prevent guerrilla resistance and exploit the country's resources. MGG/S control over the population was accomplished in accordance with the "Directives for the Political Administration in the Areas of the General Military Governorate in Serbia" (German: Direktiven für die politische Verwaltung im Bereiche des Militärgeneralgouvernements in Serbien) and with the "General Principles for the Imperial and Royal Military Administration in the Occupied Territories of Serbia" (German: Allgemeine Grundzüge für die K.u.K Militärverwaltung in den besetzten Gebieten Serbiens). Italian historian Oswald Überegger speaks of a "system of totalised, repressive occupation rule".

The MGG/S intended to ignore Hungarian objections and integrate Serbia as a part of the empire, but as an area that would remain under direct military rule for decades after the end of the war and where political participation would be prohibited to prevent the emergence of a new Serbian state.

=== Occupation forces ===
The MGG was safeguarded by a permanent Austro-Hungarian garrison consisting, in August 1916, of 35 battalions, a Landsturm regiment, six companies of patrol troops, 12 units of railway guards, four-and-a-half squadrons, five artillery batteries and two anti-aircraft batteries, totaling around 70,000 men, of which 50,000 were reserved for military operations. Within the towns and villages of the twelve districts, 5,000 gendarmes were posted in groups of 20 to 30. If needed, patrol companies also served as mobile combat reserves.

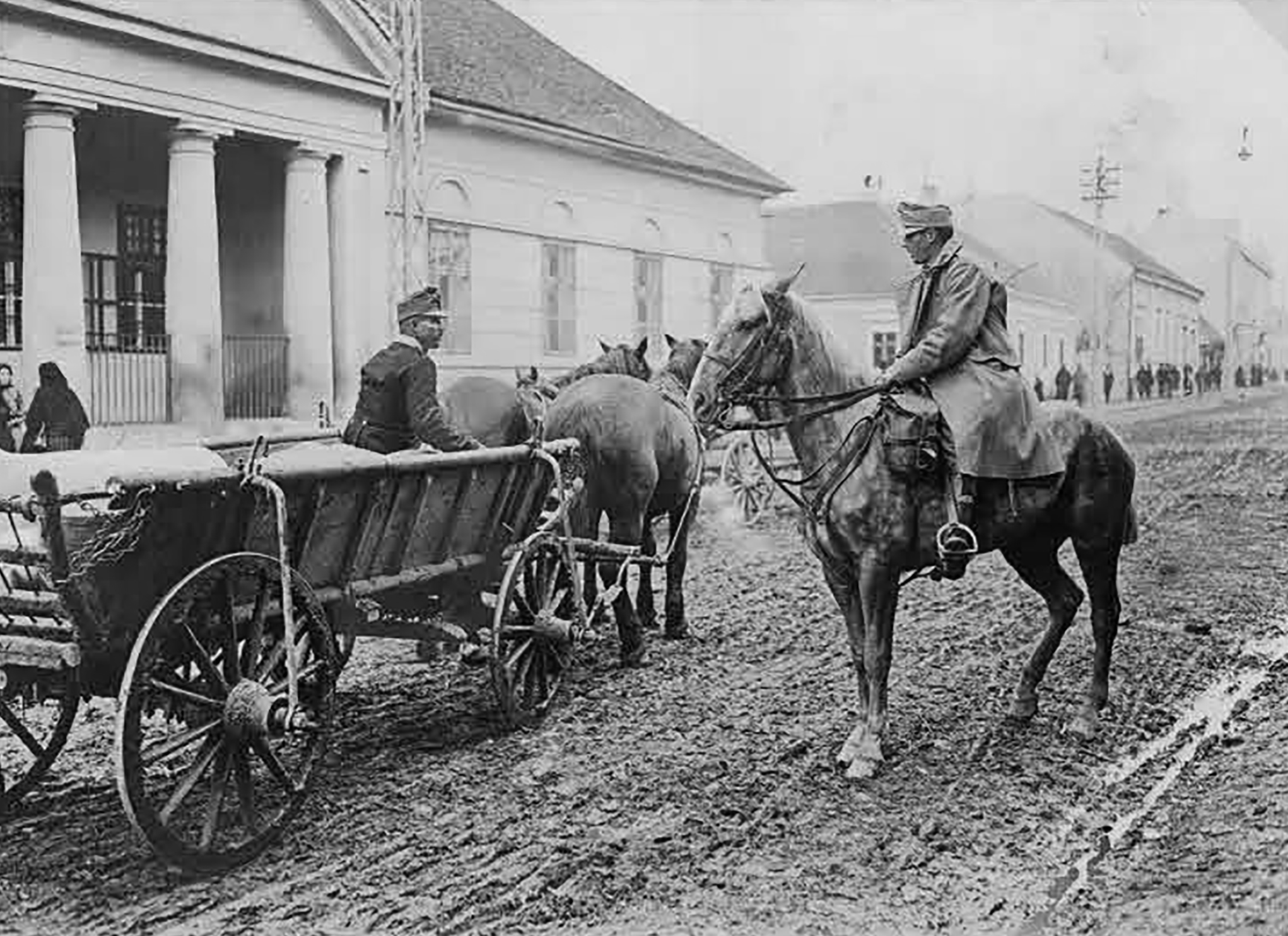
An Austro-Hungarian patrol company in the streets of Ruma.

To help police the civilian population and to track down partisans, the Austro-Hungarian leadership decided to recruit among ethnic minority groups positively disposed towards the Dual Monarchy. With Thallóczy's encouragement, the Austro-Hungarian authorities permitted Kosovo Albanians to volunteer for service in the Austro-Hungarian Armed Forces. Prominent Albanians in towns such as Novi Pazar and Kosovska Mitrovica declared their support and offered to recruit volunteers for the occupying authorities. According to the notes of Colonel Hugo Kerchnawe, the Muslims in the Sandžak and the Albanians in Kosovo "behaved very loyally and offered their support" to the empire, Kerchnawe added in his report that "our interests ran parallel with the Muslims' interests."

A special commission to organise recruitment was set up by Thallóczy, assisted by former Ottoman officers and Bosnian militia leaders. Over 8,000 volunteers were recruited this way, despite the fact that the recruitment drive was a violation of the Hague Convention treaties that Austria-Hungary had signed, which forbade the use of occupied populations towards a country's war efforts. In March 1917, a home battalion was formed, supported by Bosnian gendarmes and led by former Ottoman officers.

In the final phase of the Serbian Campaign, the Austro-Hungarian military had relied on paramilitaries consisting of Albanian clansmen from Kosovo and northern Albania as irregular troops, organised early in the occupied territories Albanian pursuit fighting units were set up to assist Austro-Hungarians patrols track down Serbian guerrillas. These counter-insurgency bands were based on their Bosnian counterparts, the Streifkorps, paramilitary groups made up of Muslim volunteers with experience fighting Serb guerrillas and a reputation for heavy-handed tactics. (Note: In August 1914 Streifkorps units (volunteer border militia) had joined the Austro-Hungarian troops invading from Bosnia, they later took part in the looting of the Serbian capital.) District pursuit units were established in each district of the Austro-Hungarian occupied zone, each consisted of 40 men led by one officer. The Bulgarian occupation authorities also used Albanian gendarmes and irregular troops within their occupation zones.

== Conflicts between the Central Powers ==
=== Annexation ===
The separation of power in Serbia quickly led to clashes between the civilian and military authorities, as well as between Austrian and Hungarian occupation officials. Chief of the General Staff of the military General Franz Conrad von Hötzendorf saw the military administration of Serbia as preliminary to its annexation, along with Montenegro and Albania, to a future South Slavic union under Croatian leadership. Conrad worried that by not annexing Serbia the monarchy would lose its Great Power status. Austria-Hungary's Joint Foreign Minister, Stephan Burián von Rajecz, supported the annexation of Serbia, but only if it would be allotted to Hungary.

For Hungarian Prime Minister István Tisza, Serbia was a Hungarian area of interest but under no circumstances did Tisza want an annexation and thus an expansion of the Slavic element in the Danube Monarchy. In early 1916. Lajos Széchényi who represented both the Croatian and Hungarian components as envoy to the foreign ministry, accused Governor Salis-Seewies of favouring the Serbs as a Croat, then Hungarian Ministry of Foreign Affairs' envoy in Serbia, Lajos Széchényi, argued that Salis-Seewis' policies would lead to Serbia's annexation to the Dual Monarchy, which Thallóczy, following Hungarian prime minister István Tisza's directives, strongly opposed.

In mid-February 1916, Thallóczy complained to Tisza about the number of Slavs in positions of authority, writing, "the governor is Croat, the chief of the general staff is Czech, the deputy governor is from the former Military Frontier and the new General Staff Officer Slavko Kvaternik is the son in law of Croatian independentist Josip Frank."

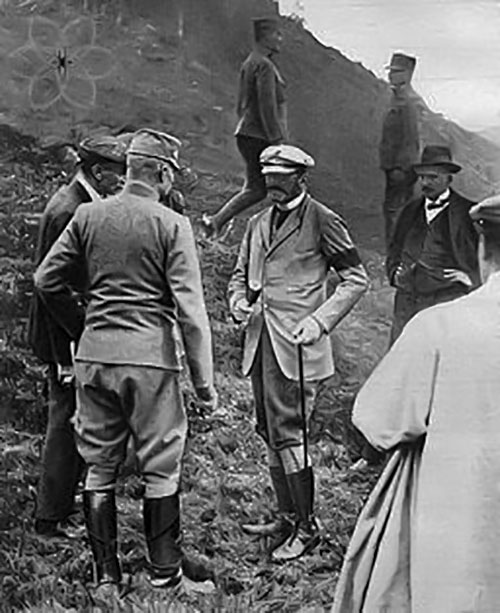
Prime Minister of Hungary, Count István Tisza was alarmed to discover that the Austro-Hungarian Army was pursuing its own political agenda in occupied Serbia.

Tisza refused to consider the annexation of Serbia as it would lead to a substantial increase in Austria-Hungary's Slavic population, and significantly reduce the proportion of Hungarians within the Dual Monarchy. He demanded instead that northern Serbia be colonized by Hungarian and German farmers. After touring the three northwestern districts of Serbia together with Salis-Seewis and the visiting General Conrad, Tisza came to regard the Austro-Hungarian military's efforts in the occupied territory as a prelude to annexation.

Tisza submitted a complaint to Burián asking for a thorough reorganisation of the Military Governorate, the removal of Salis-Seewis, whose administration he described as "Serbophile and economically incompetent", and requesting the condemnation of those demanding that Serbia be annexed. Burián took the complaint directly to Emperor Franz Joseph. On 6 July 1916, the emperor decreed that Salis-Seewis and his chief of staff, Colonel Gelinek, were to be replaced by his former corps commander, General Adolf Freiherr von Rhemen and Colonel Hugo Kerchnawe, effective 26 July 1916. Rhemen remained in this office until the end of the war.

=== Austro-Bulgarian confrontation ===
Tensions between Bulgaria and the Dual Monarchy started after Bulgaria extended its zone beyond the agreement signed on 6 September 1915; reaching into western Kosovo and Montenegro, on the Austro-Hungarian side of the treaty border, going as far as Elbasan in Albania; a region that Austria-Hungary considered an occupied friendly state and of "outstanding importance" to the Dual Monarchy. Kaiser Wilhelm himself repeatedly told Bulgarian king Ferdinand that Germany supported "the independence of Albania under Austrian protection". Burián also reminded Ferdinand that at the "west of the treaty border began the Austro-Hungarian sphere of interest."

According to the terms of the secret alliance between Bulgaria and Germany, the greater part of Kosovo, including the areas of Priština, Prizren, Gnjilane, Uroševac, and Orahovac, were to fall under Bulgarian rule as part of the Military Region of Macedonia. Metohija, the southwestern area of Kosovo, was to be incorporated as part of the Austro-Hungarian zone of Montenegro, with the rest of Kosovo, including Kosovska Mitrovica, Vučitrn, and Đakovica, established as part of the Austro-Hungarian Military Governorate of Serbia.

Tensions started over the respective zones of influence and military control in Djakova and Prizren. The Bulgarians maintained that they had the right to install a civilian administration on any territory they conquered, including outside their treaty border. Conrad, suspecting Bulgaria of harbouring ambitions to annex the whole region, sent troops to expel the Bulgarian civilian administrators. The arrival of Austro-Hungarian troops in areas already garrisoned by Bulgarian forces resulted in a military confrontation. On 27 February 1916, Bulgarian military commander Racho Petrov issued an ultimatum to the Austrians to immediately evacuate Kačanik (Kaçanik, southern Kosovo), on the frontier with Macedonia, resulting in a military standoff. General Conrad immediately halted all deliveries of war supplies and warned the Bulgarian High Command that unless local Bulgarian commanders abstained from interfering with the Austro-Hungarian administration, a conflict with his troops would be inevitable.

On 15 March, the Austro-Hungarians issued an order to secure the districts of Prijepolje, Novi Pazar, and Kosovska Mitrovica to their governorate, three districts acquired by Serbia during the First Balkan War. Bulgarian actions on the ground persisted, leading to a second crisis, with Conrad demanding diplomatic assistance against Bulgarian violations. The German chief of staff, General Erich von Falkenhayn, ordered Mackensen to mediate between the two parties, consequently Mackensen visited Sofia to meet Ferdinand and Prime Minister Vasil Radoslavov. The proposed German compromise was accepted and, on 1 April 1916, an agreement on a demarcation line was signed between the Austro-Hungarian and Bulgarian high commands.

The Bulgarians withdrew eastwards, retaining the district containing Prizren and Priština, but leaving Albania and western Kosovo to the Austro-Hungarians. The Ottomans, wary of Bulgarian designs on Albania, supported Austro-Hungarian aims to prevent Bulgaria's reach into Elbassan and keep Albania autonomous under Austrian influence. The agreement gave Bulgaria administrative rights over areas of Serbia that were not in the original agreement. In return, in addition to the railways and mines already yielded to the Germans, Bulgaria agreed to give them access to the valleys east of the Velika Morava, the Južna Morava in Kosovo, as well as the Vardar Valley; effectively turning Macedonia and Kosovo into zones dedicated to German economic exploitation.

== Life under the occupation ==
=== Denationalisation and depoliticisation ===
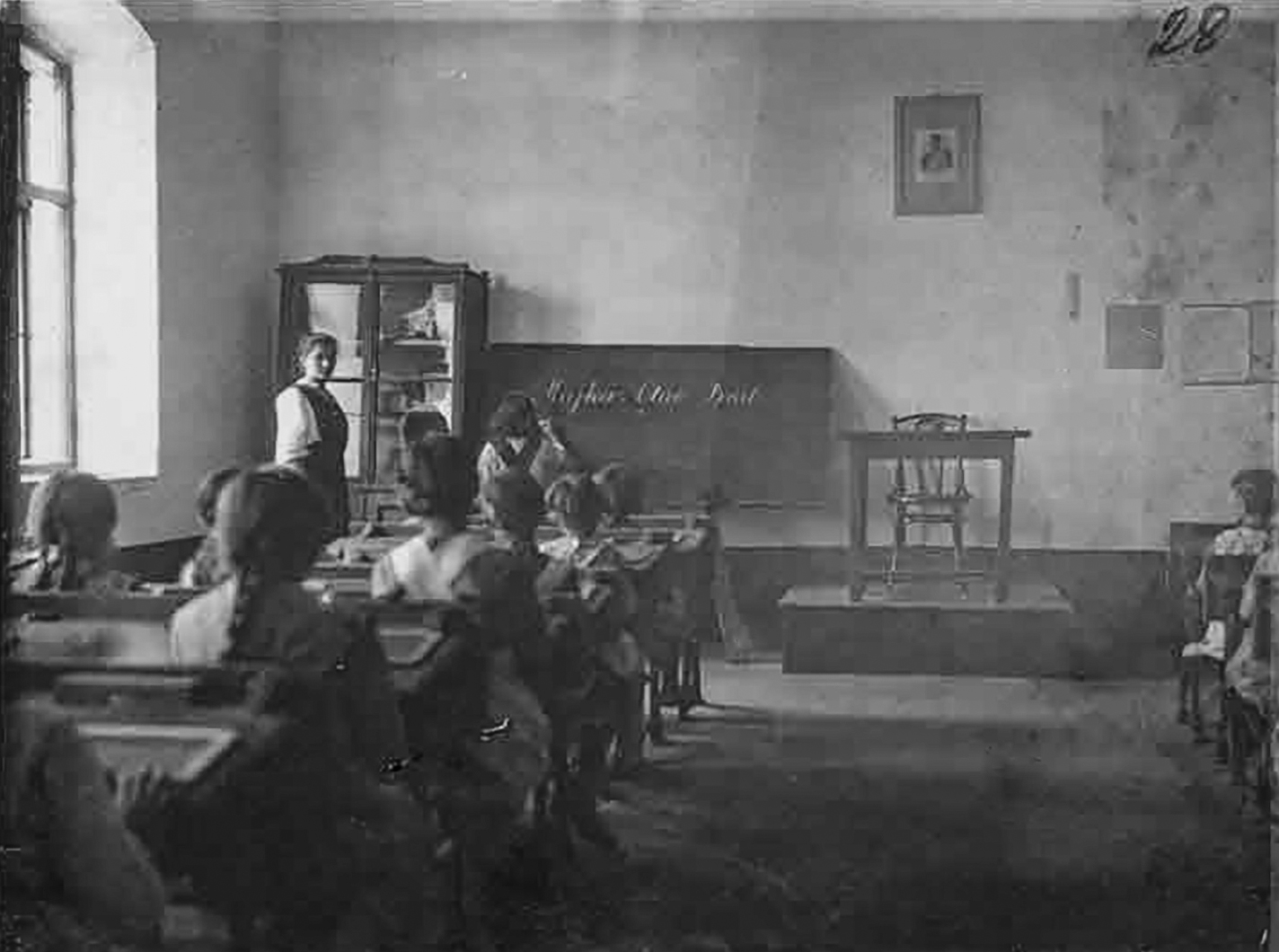
Serbian schoolchildren in Loznica learning Latin characters after the Cyrillic script was banned by the Austro-Hungarian authorities. A portrait of Emperor Franz Joseph can be seen on the wall.

The occupational authorities considered Serbian national consciousness an existential threat to Austria-Hungary. Thus, the policies of the Military Governorate were aimed at depoliticising and denationalising the Serbian population. Public gatherings and political parties were banned, the Cyrillic script was termed "dangerous to the state" (German: staatsgefährlich) and banned from schools and public spaces, streets named after people perceived as being significant to Serbian national identity were renamed, the wearing of traditional Serbian clothing was proscribed and the Gregorian calendar replaced the Julian. Additionally, all Serbian students had to be educated in the German language, according to Austrian academic standards and through teachers imported from Austria.

Significant cultural institutions such as the Royal Serbian Academy, the National Museum and the National Library were closed down and looted of their historical artifacts and art collections. The University of Belgrade, as well as various publishing houses and bookshops, were closed down. Schoolbooks and books in French, English, Russian and Italian were banned. Political expression was severely limited with the prohibition of newspaper publication except for the official MGG/S propaganda newspaper Belgrader Nachrichten (published in Serbian as Beogradske novine), which featured letters and photographs purporting to show how well those who stayed behind in occupied Serbia were living. Such propaganda was intended to convince Serbian soldiers who came across the Belgrader Nachrichten to desert. (Note: Front-line patrols were instructed to approach Serbian posts and deposit propaganda material such as the Belgrader Nachrichten to encourage desertion by promising freedom to those longing to return home.)

=== Repression ===
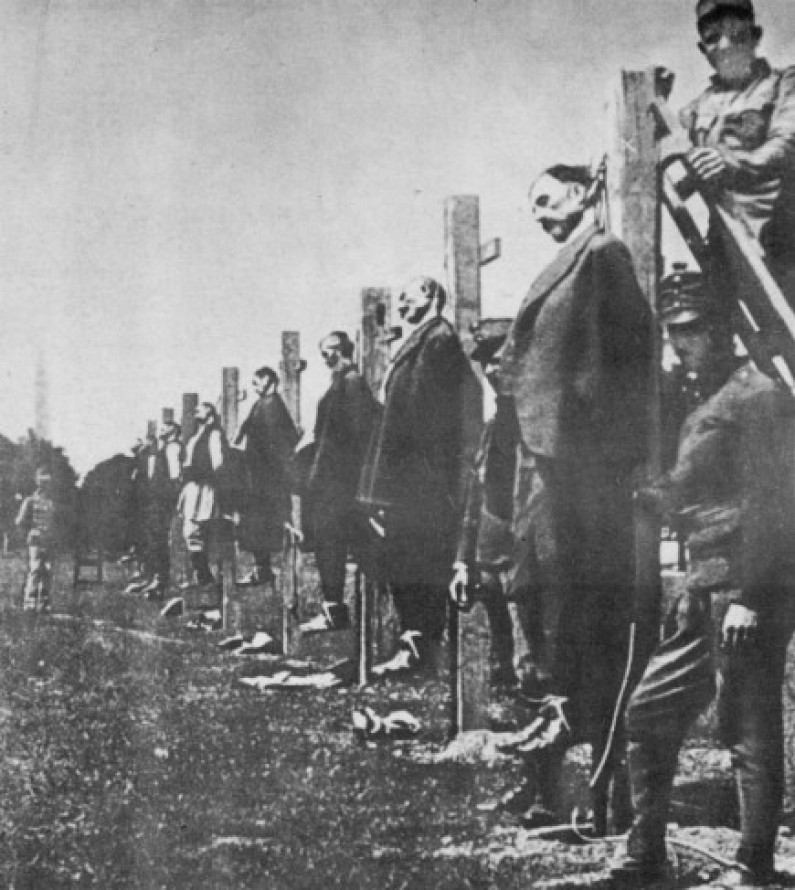
Public execution of alleged Serbian guerrillas by Austro-Hungarian troops, c. 1916

In 1916, both Austria-Hungary and Bulgaria announced that Serbia had ceased to exist as a political entity, and that its inhabitants could therefore not invoke the international rules of war dictating the treatment of civilians as defined by the Geneva Conventions and the Hague Conventions.

The occupational authorities carried out numerous summary executions with little or no legal process. Upon being found guilty by a military court, victims were usually shot or hanged. Martial law, such as Kriegsnotwehrrecht (the martial law of self-defense), was employed to quash dissent and severe preventive measures were undertaken against civilians.

The occupational authorities were gripped by the fear of levée en masse and of civilians taking up arms. The Austro-Hungarian Army consequently employed the seizure of hostages from the general population and the burning of villages in punitive raids as a means of quelling resistance. These measures, as well as summary executions, were all permitted under section 61 of the Dienstreglement (Note: The Dienstreglement, the Habsburg army regulations, dictated that "an enemy or unreliable population is to be placed under the constraint of severe reprisals such as hostage-taking from among communities, Standrecht (summary justice), punishments, and the like.") (k.u.k army regulations). Disarming the populace was done by holding village elders responsible for handing over a certain quota of weapons that were judged to be held before the war began. The sentence for possession of a weapon was death by hanging. Military courts also tried civilians for newly defined offenses, including the crime of lèse-majesté.

Civilians suspected of engaging in resistance activities were subjected to the harshest measures, including hanging and shooting. The house of an offender's family would also be destroyed. Victims were usually hanged on the main squares of villages and towns, in full view of the general population. The lifeless bodies were left to hang by the noose for several days so as to clearly show the treatment reserved for "spies" and "traitors".

=== Deportation and forced labour ===
The MGG/S, as well as the High Command in Vienna, considered sending civilian prisoners to internment camps as a preventive measure to discourage insurgent activities. During the occupation, between 150,000 and 200,000 men, women and children were deported to various camps in Austria-Hungary, it has been estimated they represented slightly more than 10 per cent of the Serb population. At the 1919 Versailles peace conference the Serbian government estimated 50,000 out of 147,677 POWs and 20,000 of the 50,000 civilians deported to Austro-Hungarian camps died over the course of the war. More recent research has individually identified 59,524 fatalities out of 236,807 Serbian citizens interned during the war.

Since Serbia did not have its own Red Cross, Serbian prisoners did not have access to the aid the Red Cross provided to other Allied prisoners. Moreover, Serbian prisoners were not considered "enemy aliens" but "internal enemies" by Austria-Hungary's Ministry of War. By defining them as "terrorists" or "insurgents", the Austro-Hungarian authorities were not obliged to disclose the number of captives they held, and which camps they were being held in, to Red Cross societies.

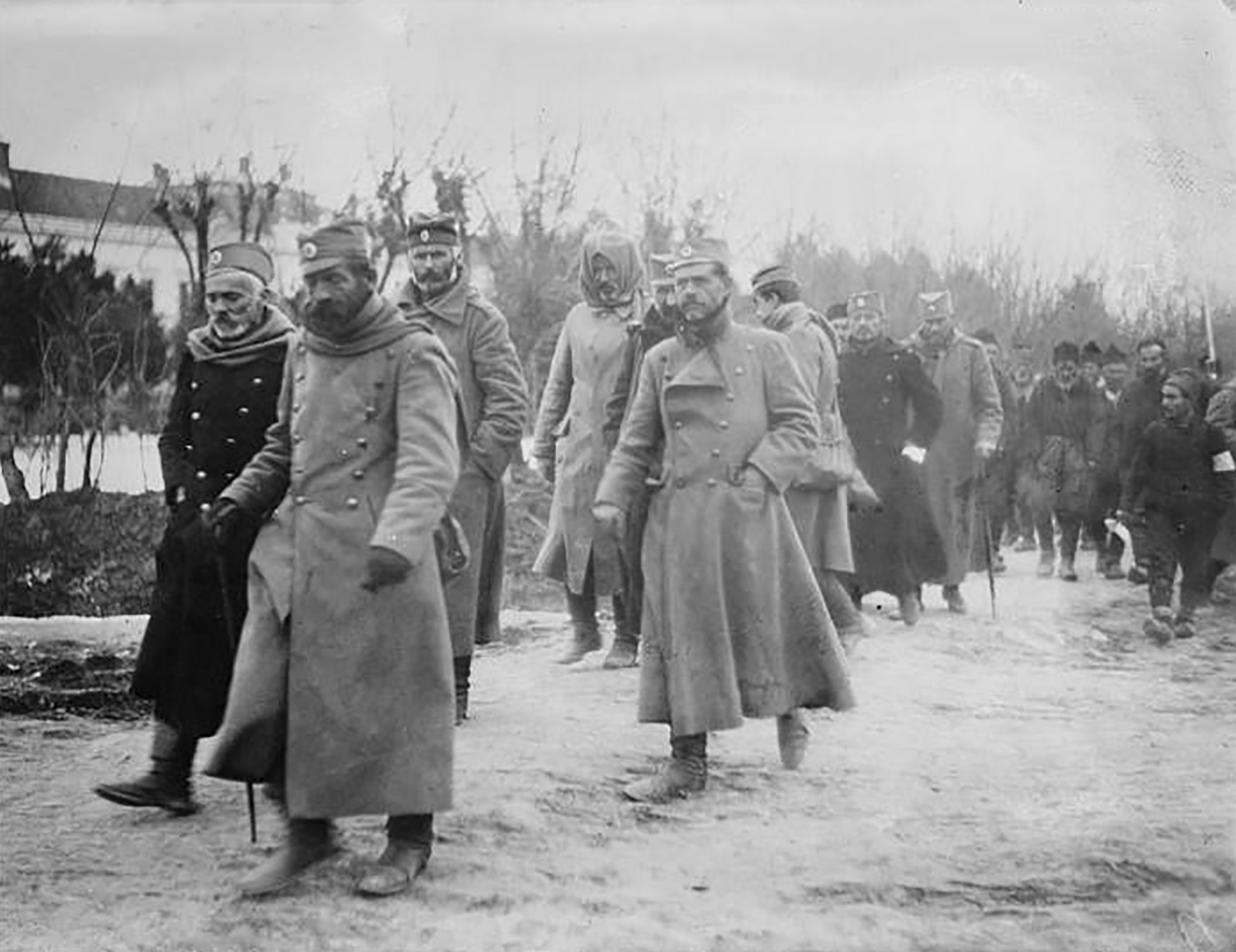
Serbian prisoners of war in Austro-Hungarian captivity

Four significant waves of deportations occurred in occupied Serbia. The first occurred at the very start of the occupation, when Salis-Seewis rounded up 70,000 "dissidents", mostly able-bodied men, ex-soldiers, politically active individuals, as well as members of the political and cultural elite who had remained in the country after the retreat to Corfu. University professors, teachers, and priests, especially those who had participated in political, cultural or even athletic associations, were arrested and sent to internment camps.

The second and largest deportations took place after Romania entered the war on the side of the Allies on 27 August 1916. From mid-August to late October 1916, an order to arrest all males between the ages of 17 and 50 was issued. These men were targeted because they were of fighting age. More than 16,500 males were sent to internment camps during this round of deportations. During the Toplica uprising, in the Spring of 1916 when armed resistance seemed to be spreading, more deportations took place. The fourth and final round of deportations occurred after the Allied breakthrough on the Salonica front in late 1918. In Bohemia, the camp at Braunau (modern-day Broumov, Czech Republic) held about 35,000 prisoners, almost exclusively Serbian, civilian, military prisoners, men, women and children. According to a 1918 press report, an epidemic of dysentery almost wiped out all the children in the camp. After the war, a mass grave was found behind the camp containing the remains of 2,674 people (these remains were later moved to the crypt of the Heinrichsgrün camp). The camp at Heinrichsgrün (modern-day Jindřichovice, Czech Republic), held mostly Serbs, both soldiers and civilians, from the Šumadija and Kolubara districts of western Serbia. An average of 40 people died there every day.

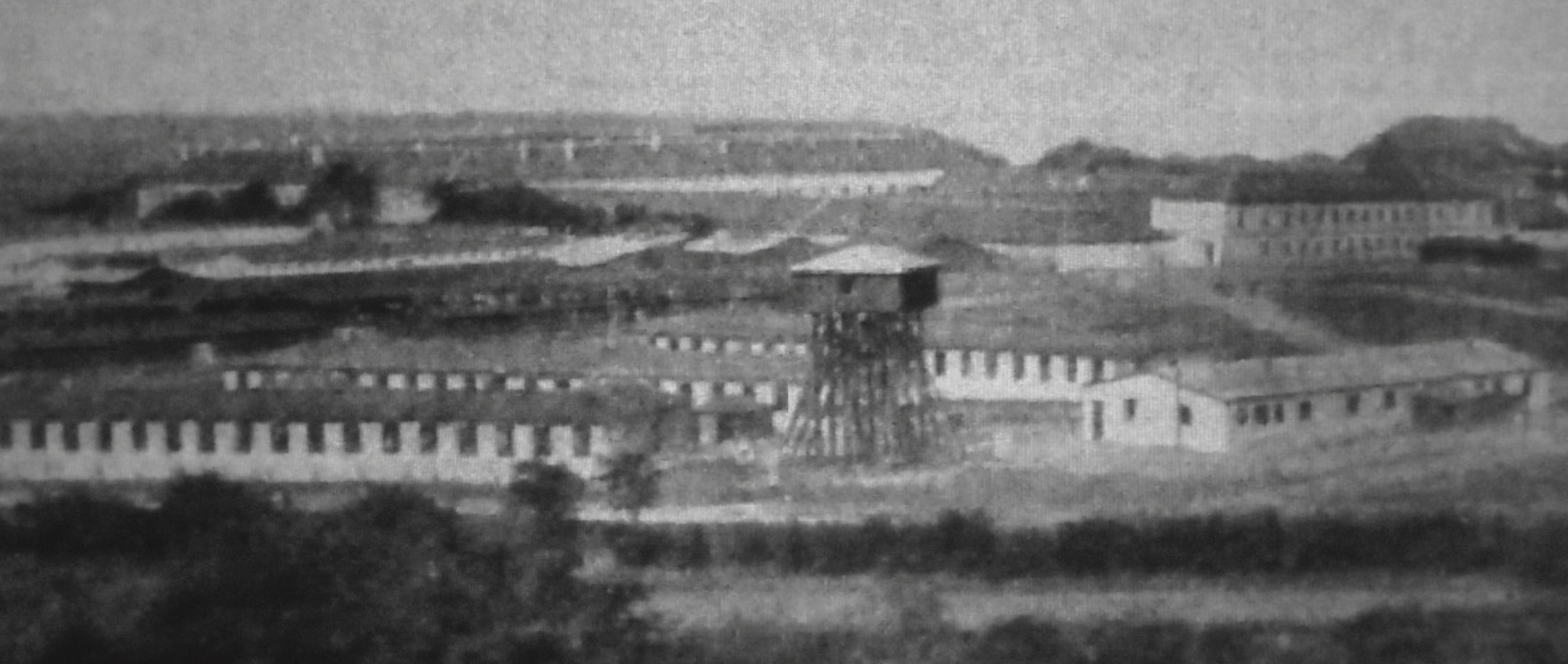
The Nezsider concentration camp (in modern-day Neusiedl am See, Austria), where about 17,000 internees, mostly from Serbia and Montenegro, were held

In Hungary, the largest internment camps were in the Nezsider district; Nezsider (modern-day Neusiedl am See, Austria) was a concentration camp primarily used to detain civilians from Serbia and Montenegro, and the principal camp for Serbs suspected to be "terrorists" or "agitators". The number of detainees by May 1917 was 9,934, including children as young as nine. Over the course of the war, the Nezsider camp held 17,000 internees, about 4,800 people are known to have perished at the camp.

In addition to those deported to Hungary, some 30,000 Serb civilians were sent to Austrian camps or used as forced labour. In Lower Austria, the camps of Drosendorf and Mittendorf held both Serbian soldiers and civilians. Thousand of Serbs perished during a typhus epidemic at the Mauthausen camp in Upper Austria when about 14,000 were being held; an official Austro-Hungarian army report mentioned 5,600 prisoners of war buried in the camp graveyard in the early months of the war.

According to official figures, between 27 December 1915 and 5 July 1917, 45,791 civilians and prisoners of war from Serbia and Montenegro were held captive at the camp in Doboj, in Bosnia. Around 12,000 are estimated to have perished there. Other camps held both civilians and prisoners of war, including Boldogasszony, Nagymegyer (modern-day Veľký Meder, Slovakia), Arad (modern-day Romania), Cegléd, Kecskemét and Győr.

By May 1917, 39,359 people from Serbia, including women and children, were interned outside the country. These large scale deportations caused concern around Europe quickly becoming an international scandal. The Spanish authorities complained then, in April 1917, the Holy See intervened through the office of the Apostolic Nunciature to Austria against the internment of Serbian women and children between the ages of 10 and 15. By the end of the year, Austria-Hungary's Ministry of War admitted that 526 Serb children were in fact being held at Nezsider, but that it was necessary on the grounds of military security.

According to a Red Cross report dated 1 February 1918, by the end of 1917, there were 206,500 prisoners of war and internees from Serbia in Austro-Hungarian and German camps. According to the historian Alan Kramer, the Serbians in Austro-Hungarian captivity received the worst treatment of all the prisoners, and at least 30,000–40,000 had died of starvation by January 1918.

=== Economic exploitation and famine ===
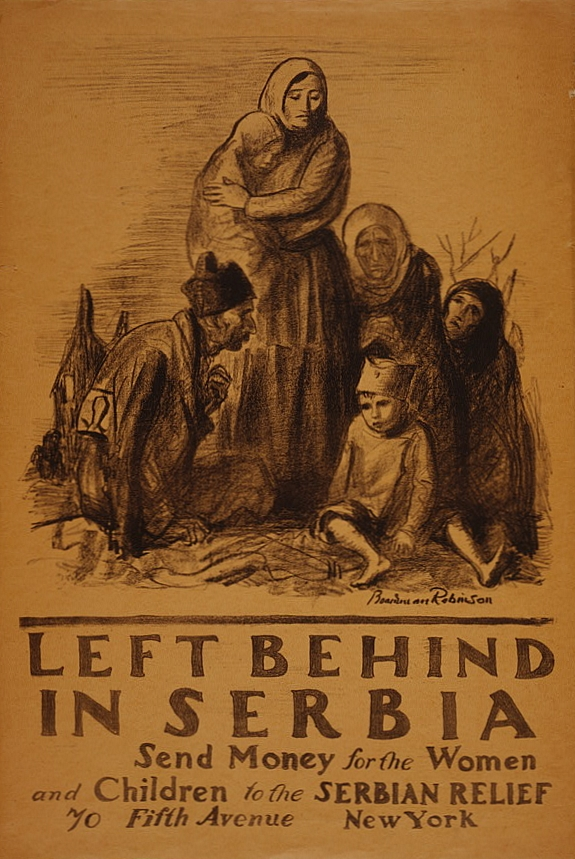
A Serbian Relief Fund campaign poster distributed in New York, c. 1918

The economic exploitation of Serbia during the occupation was characterised by various measures, including confiscations, requisitions, and the use of economic resources and labor. Extensive requisitions of materials such as wool, copper, brass, nickel, zinc, as well as food and leather were conducted by Special units, known as Suchdetaschement. Seized materials were sent to Materialsammelstelle, an administrative body in Belgrade then transported to Austria-Hungary.

Tensions between the Austrian and German authorities increased after Burián complained that the German military was employing a ruthless system of requisition, resulting in famine and the pauperisation of the population. Behind the front lines, the Germans "Etappenzone" was an area that Berlin had secured as a zone dedicated to agricultural production to feed its troops on the Salonica front. As the German exploitation of resources in occupied Serbia was handled by the German Oriental Society (German: Deutsch-orientalische Gesellschaft), the exploitation of mines failed to satisfy the Dual Monarchy's need for vital raw materials because Germany took two-thirds of all production from Serbia as reparations for its military aid.

Austro-Hungarian reports on the state of Serbia in 1915 noted famine threatening the occupation zone and a population in a desperate state after nearly four years of constant war. The return of refugees exacerbated the shortage of food. Reports from late 1915 spoke of the necessity of receiving urgent relief to avoid disaster. Starvation loomed after soldiers destroyed or captured much of Serbia's foodstuffs and livestock. Harvest yields and produced goods had to be turned over to authorities while food was rationed. In late 1915, reports from Serbia emphasised the urgent need for relief from Austria-Hungary to avert a looming disaster. Austrian Prime Minister, Karl von Stürgkh, was inclined to respond positively to these appeals but Tisza and Conrad were firmly opposed to it.

In this very year (1917) there was a drought that can never be forgotten. A frost and then a drought destroyed everything. Even had there not been a war, hunger would have invaded us. People ate wild herbs and sawdust made from beechwood . . . . It was then for the first time that we spoke of death.

— Milovan Djilas, Land Without Justice,

In early 1916, Conrad ordered that Serbia's resources be "squeezed dry" regardless of the consequences for the population. As news of the famine in Serbia spread around the world, campaigns were organised asking for Relief for Agonized Serbia. American, Swiss and Swedish humanitarian organisations offered assistance. According to Red Cross reports, starvation killed more than 8,000 Serbians during the first winter under Austro-Hungarian occupation. By mid-May 1917, figures from the Habsburg High Command reported that 170,000 cattle, 190,000 sheep, and 50,000 pigs had been exported to Austria-Hungary.

Austro-Hungarian sources often portrayed Serbia as a land of agricultural abundance during the occupation. Alan Sked, referencing Jonathan E. Gumz's work, noted that "civilian ration quotas were higher than in starving Austria." (Note: Sked also described the occupation as "relatively mild," a perspective that contrasts with the majority of academic accounts, which emphasise the systemic violence and brutality, as documented by historians like Alan Kramer.) This portrayal largely stemmed from Austro-Hungarian propaganda aimed at sustaining morale in the Habsburg hinterland by presenting occupied Serbia as a success story. Reports by neutral relief organisations and historians suggest that Serbia's actual situation was far more complex. The initial chaos of war had left Serbia devastated, with widespread hunger, epidemics, and infrastructural collapse. Typhus reached epidemic proportions, with a mortality rate of 60%, and more than 150,000 civilian casualties were recorded in 1915 alone. By 1916, the food situation in Serbia temporarily improved due to a harvest that yielded 40% above the normal level. By the summer of 1916, aid to Serbia was effectively terminated, as noted by historian Piotr S. Wandycz The British and French estimated that any food or supplies sent to Serbia would likely be requisitioned by Austria-Hungary and used for its own benefit.

Deprived of large-scale relief and subjected to Austrian and Bulgarian requisitions, Serbia faced worsening conditions in the last two years of the war. By 1917, the number of seriously ill reached well into six figures, and food shortages caused the fatality rate to soar to one-third of the population. Reports from relief agencies and observers indicated that much of the population was vulnerable to famine and disease, exacerbated by continued requisitions and the blockade.

Propaganda efforts aimed to obscure these realities. Austro-Hungarian-controlled newspapers, including Die Belgrader Nachrichten, frequently advertised abundant food supplies and described Serbia as a prosperous, well-managed territory. Travel reports by journalists such as Hans Richter described Serbia as a "garden of paradise" and confidently predicted it could become "the breadbasket of Europe," feeding not only the army but also Austro-Hungarian civilians. These portrayals stood in stark contrast to the dire conditions reported by neutral observers, which revealed a population enduring significant suffering during the occupation. Wandycz asserts that the scale of Serbia's suffering far exceeded that experienced by Belgium. According to the Austrian War Ministry, population in the Austro-Hungarian-occupied zone of Serbia dropped by 50 per cent, a figure attributed to the severity of Austrian military courts as well as deaths from diseases caused by malnutrition.

=== Resistance ===
Immediately after the withdrawal of the Royal Serbian Army and the start of the Austro-Hungarian occupation, armed individuals and small groups of insurgents, called Chetniks, made up of former soldiers who had remained in the country, began to wage a guerrilla campaign against the occupiers. The Chetniks had a long tradition as guerrillas after centuries of Ottoman rule. Their actions were often considered heroic by the population and depicted in epic folk poetry, giving them strong local support.

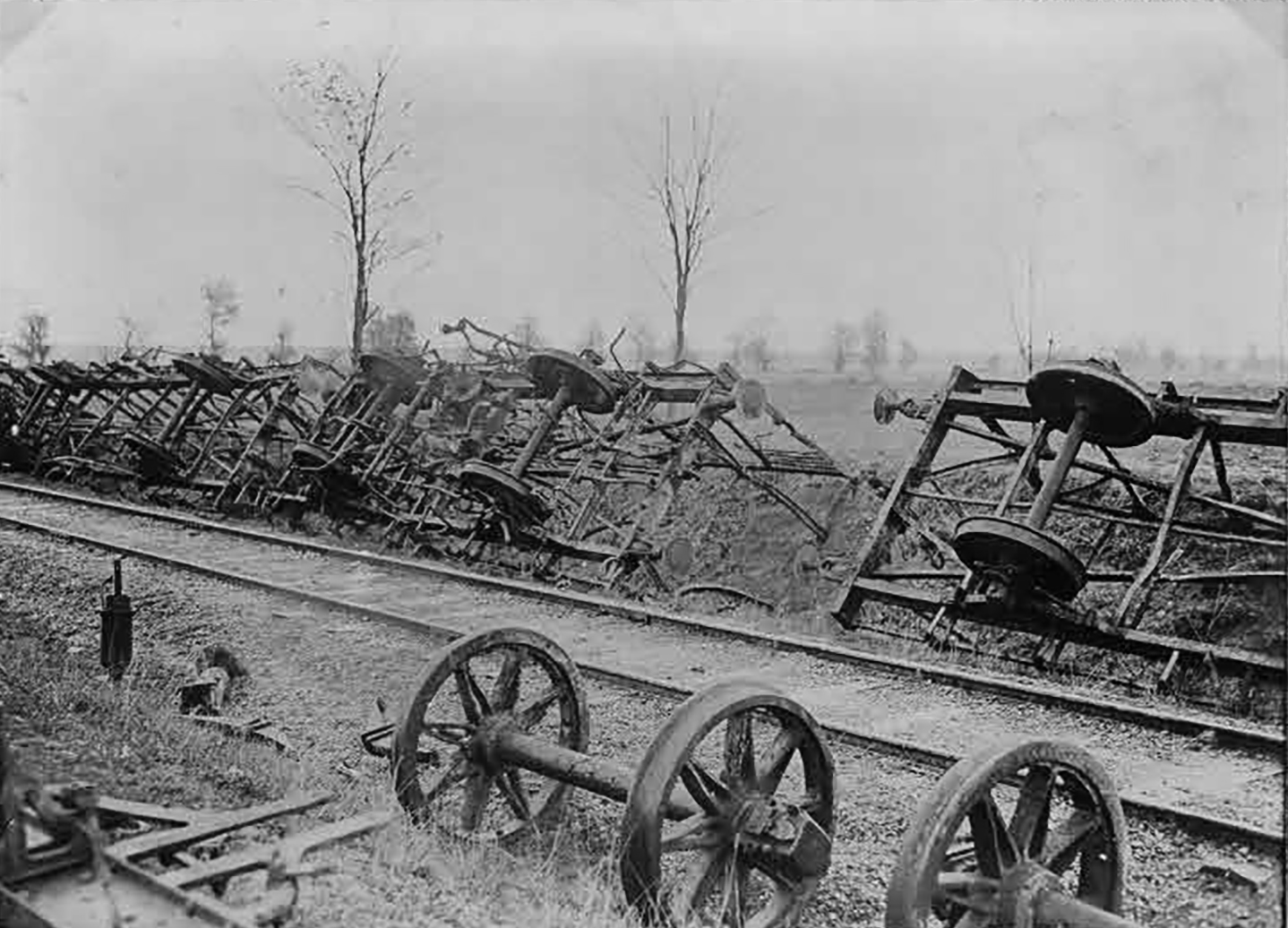
The burned-out remains of a train in Šabac

The first organised guerrilla group was formed in the Novi Pazar and Kosovska Mitrovica districts in early 1916, and was led by former army captain Kosta Vojinović. In March 1916, General Conrad ordered that all resistance be quashed with ruthless severity. Komitadjis, as the Austro-Hungarian army called the insurgents, were deemed outside international law by the MGG and were to be "completely wiped out". (Note: The Kriegsausstellung war exhibition of 1917, held in Vienna, was intended to characterize Serb civilians and Komitadjis as criminals outside the laws and customs of war. It included a section about guerrilla warfare in Serbia, where visitors could learn about the methods used to track Komitadjis and Chetniks, including a life-size model of one of their hideout.) Jovan Avakumović, a former Prime Minister of Serbia, suggested to Salis-Seewis that he should issue a joint proclamation for the restoration of peace and order. Avakumović's proposal was turned down and Salis-Seewis ordered his arrest and internment.

The Military Governorate responded to the multiplication of guerrilla groups by employing small Ottoman and Albanian counter-guerrilla units based on the Streifkorps from Bosnia instead of regular patrol troops. In late September 1916, the Serbian High Command flew in the experienced Chetnik guerrilla leader Kosta Pećanac from Allied Headquarters in Salonica. He was parachuted in by air to organize resistance in Serbia together with Vojinović.

In early February 1917, a rebellion led by Vojinović broke out in the vicinity of Kuršumlija and Prokuplje. The insurgents, supported by volunteers and Chetniks from Montenegro, liberated Kuršumlija, Prokuplje, Pusta Reka, Lebane and Ribarska. The uprising was planned to coincide with an Allied offensive. Later that month, a large scale uprising broke out in the Toplica District in Bulgarian-occupied Serbia. A force of 4,000 armed men and women managed to liberate a significant area in the Morava Valley before the uprising was put down. During the summer of 1917, the Austro-Hungarian Army was forced to bring in troops from the Isonzo Front to reinforce the Bulgarian Army and Bulgarian paramilitary groups. Without the expected Allied support, the uprising collapsed. In late 1917, Vojinović was killed; Pećanac managed to escape and went into hiding. According to contemporary Austro-Hungarian Army reports, 20,000 Serbs were killed in the course of the rebellion, while 2,600 managed to escape into the forests. Despite the harsh repression, guerrilla groups managed to survive and were able to support Allied offensive operations in the summer of 1918. After the war, Chief of Staff Paul Kirch described the withdrawal of the German 11th Army:

Serb guerrilla groups emerged throughout the country and attacked our units when they were resting or eating. They also attacked our rearguard and our supply trains on the march and sabotaged the railways. We have sent special Jäger units against them, but it would have been easier to find a needle in a haystack than to find those guerrilla groups in the mountain terrain they are familiar with.

== Liberation of Serbia ==
In September 1918, following the Vardar Offensive and the success of Allied forces at the Battle of Dobro Pole, Bulgaria capitulated and signed the Armistice of Salonica. On 3 October, a German military governorate was created in Niš to replace the departing Bulgarian administration, while new Austro-Hungarian and German troops were redeployed to try to block the northward advance of Serb and French troops.

Guerilla warfare broke out spontaneously across all occupied regions in support of the Allies offensive. By the third week of October, General Hermann von Kövess, commander of all Austro-Hungarian and German forces in the Balkans, ordered a strategic retreat behind the Danube, Sava and Drina rivers, also ordering that ‘about "two per cent of the male population should be taken as hostages, and kept with the troops on the march".

On 29 October, Governor-General von Rhemen and his staff left occupied Serbia. The following day, Belgrade was liberated by the Royal Serbian Army. By 1 November, all of pre-war Serbia had been liberated, bringing the three-year Central Powers occupation to an end.

== Military commanders and governors ==
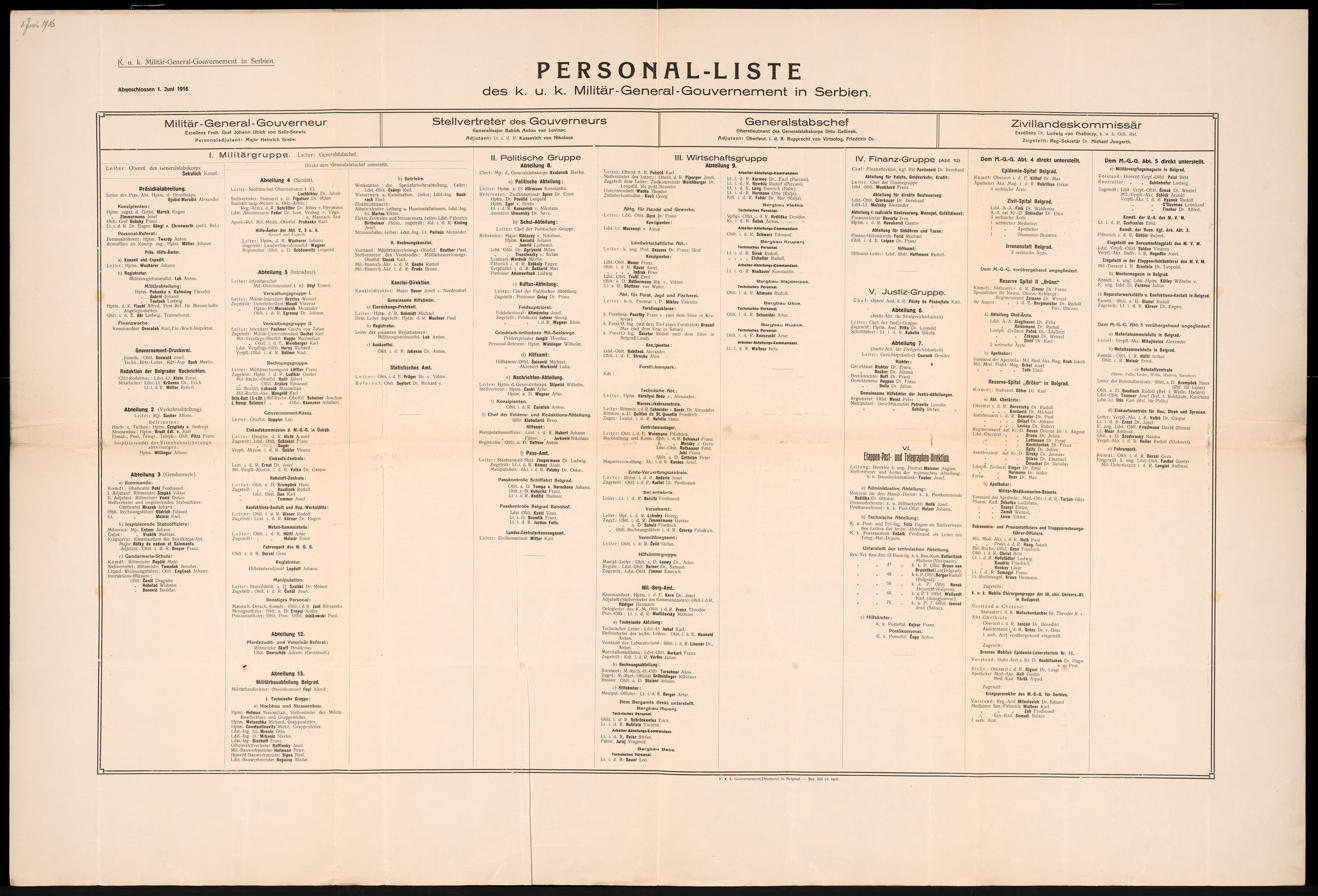
Personnel list of the Military General Government in Serbia, 1916

=== Austro-Hungarian commanders ===
- Feldzeugmeister Oskar Potiorek (12 August 1914 – 27 December 1914)
- Generaloberst Archduke Eugen Ferdinand (27 December 1914 – 27 May 1915)
- General Karl Tersztyánszky von Nádas (27 May 1915 – 27 September 1915)
- General Hermann Kövess von Kövessháza (27 September 1915 – 1 January 1916)

=== Austro-Hungarian military governors-general ===
- Feldmarschallleutnant Johann Ulrich Graf von Salis-Seewis (1 January 1916 – July 1916)
- Generaloberst Adolf Freiherr von Rhemen zu Barensfeld (6 July 1916 – October 1918)
- Generalfeldmarschall Hermann Kövess von Kövessháza (October 1918 – 1 November 1918)

== See also ==
- Invasion of Serbia by Bulgaria during the First World War
- Military General Governorate of Serbia
- Bulgarian occupation of Serbia (World War I)
- Nazi occupation of Serbia (World War II)
