= Bora Stanković =

Bora Stanković may refer to:

- Borisav Stanković (1875–1927), Serbian writer
- Borislav Stanković (1925–2020), basketball official and long-time president of FIBA
