= Impure Blood (film) =

- Serbian: Nečista krv
- Directed by: Stojan Stojčić
- Based on: Impure Blood by Borisav Stanković
- Edited by: Petar Jakonić; Mirjana Kićović; Andrija Zafranović
- Release date: 1997
- Running time: 125 minutes
- Country: Yugoslavia
- Language: Serbian

Impure Blood (Serbian: Нечиста крв / Nečista krv) is a Yugoslav historical drama filmed in 1991 and released in 1997.

== Background ==
Impure Blood is an adaptation of the Nečista krv novel written by Borisav Stanković. It features Vranje local (and later political activist) Maja Stojanović and actor Rade Šerbedžija in the lead roles.

== Cast ==
- Maja Stojanović as Sofka
- Rade Šerbedžija as Marko
- Tzvetana Maneva
- Meto Jovanovski as Agim
- Ljuba Tadić as Efendi Mito
- Filip Gajić as Tomča
- Neda Arnerić as Biljarica

== Tajna nečiste krvi ==
The project was originally a combined adaptation of two Borisav Stanković novels: Nečista krv and Koštana. Turbo-folk singer Ceca was cast as the Romani girl Koštana. However, due to some conflicts, the film could be released years after it was filmed and covering only one of the novels. By 2011, Serbian television network Happy TV bought the entire footage of the film and, starting from 1 January 2012, it was aired as a 12-episode miniseries under the title Tajna nečiste krvi (The Secret of the Impure Blood).
