= Impure Blood =

Novel written by Borisav Stanković

Impure Blood (Serbian: Нечиста крв, Nečista krv) or Sophka is a novel written by Borisav Stanković. It is concerned with themes of the Serbian south, during the reforming in the late 19th century.

== Synopsis ==
The novel is set in Vranje, at the end of the 19th century. The main character is Sofka, a 26-year-old beautiful virgin from a čorbadžija family. However, after the fall of the Sanjak of Niš to Serbia and the following social turmoil, her family loses most of their fortune, forcing her father, Efendi Mita, to have her married off to Tomča, the 12-year-old son of gazda Marko. Marko however actually wanted Sofka for himself, to give him healthy and beautiful children. During Sofka's wedding night, Sofka locks herself and Tomča in the bedroom to avoid Marko, who beats his wife and begs Sofka to let him in. Suddenly, Marko, scared from the desire he has for Sofka, leaves to go and fight in the war against the Albanians, in which he dies. After his death, Sofka and Tomča live happily, and Tomča grows into an attractive man. However, Mita arrives to demand the money he was promised by Marko. Tomča, devastated to learn that Sofka was bought by his father, starts to abuse her daily. She starts drinking and having children, who are mostly born pale and ill, due to the curse of the 'impure blood' that had begun a long time ago, with Sofka's ancestors. She loses her beauty and becomes old and quiet, uninterested in anything but drinking and sitting in silence. At the end of the novel, Sofka is sitting near the fireplace with no fire in it, only ashes. She is seen going through the ashes with a stick while her children are running around the house.

== Film adaptations ==
1948 film Sofka by Radoš Novaković and starring Vera Gregović is the first cinematic adaptation of the novel. In 1991, it was made into a film starring Maja Stojanović and released in 1997 as Impure Blood. A miniseries related to this adaptation and titled Tajna nečiste krvi was aired in 2012. A prequel film, titled Impure Blood: The Ancestral Sin, was released on August 26, 2021.

== Bibliography ==
- Stanković, Borisav (1910). Нечиста крв [Impure Blood] (PDF) (in Serbian). Београд: Нова Штампарија – Давидовић.
