= Belgrader Nachrichten =

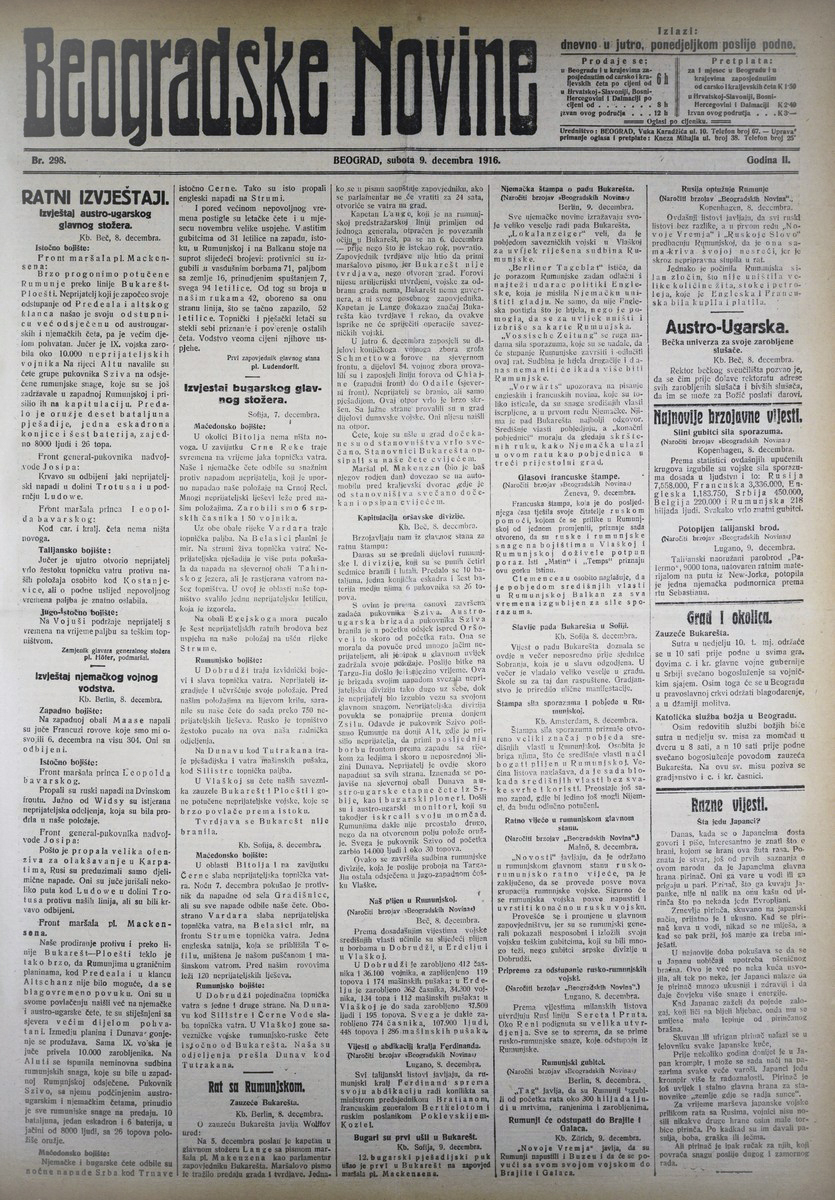
- Beogradske Novine of 9 December 1916
- Type: Daily newspaper 1916-1918; Three times a week 1915
- Publisher: MGG/S (Note: Military General-Governorate in Serbia)
- Editor-in-chief: Milan Ogrizović
- Founded: 15 December 1915; 110 years ago
- Ceased publication: June 29, 1918
- Language: German; Serbo-Croatian; Hungarian (Note: from June 1916)
- City: Belgrade
- Country: Territory of the Military Governorate in Serbia

The Belgrader Nachrichten (Serbian: Beogradske Novine, lit. 'Belgrade News'), was the official occupation periodical of the Austro-Hungarian Military Governorate in Serbia during the First World War. As the main propaganda organ, the focus of the newspaper was to portray the occupation and its government as benevolent and working in the interest of the Serb population. It was published daily, in German, Serbo-Croatian and Hungarian from 1915 to 1918, during the occupation of Serbia.

== History ==
In 1916, the new Austro-Hungarian military governor of Serbia instituted a system of military law that allowed only one newspaper, the Army's Belgrader Nachrichten, to be printed. During the occupation the use of Serbian Cyrillic script was forbidden in public life, Serbian language was re-cast as "Serbo-Croatian". Printed materials for the population of Serbia were exclusively in Latin script, Ijekavian dialect with Croatian lexis.

The Belgrader Nachrichten was distributed in Austro-Hungarian occupied territories in German, Hungarian and Serbo-Croatian. The German version was distributed throughout Europe with the aim of demonstrating how Austria and Germany had come to Serbia as 'a bearer of prosperity, to enlighten it' while the Serbian version was for the local population to believe that the Militärverwaltung in Serbien (Military administration in Serbia) was working in their interest, unlike the previous Serbian Karađorđević dynasty which had deceptively led them into war.

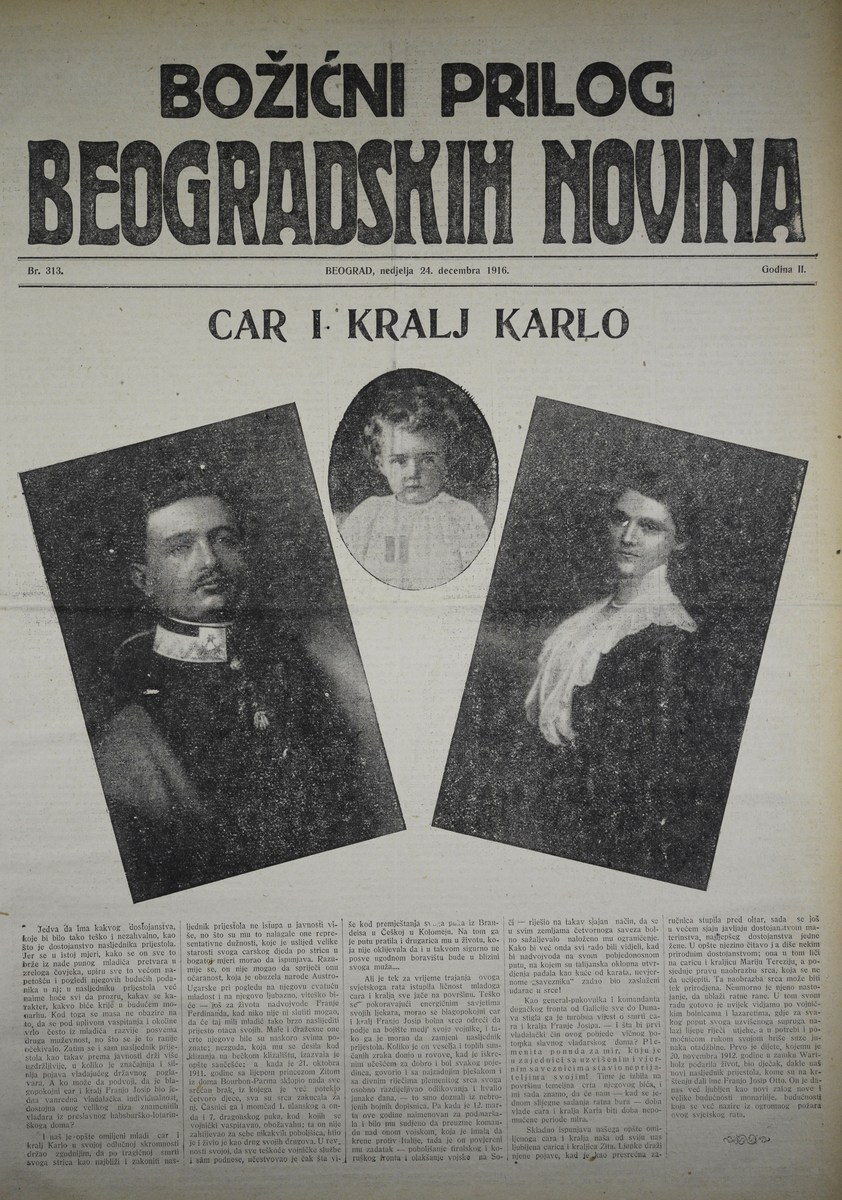
Edition of 24 December 1916

== Notable contributors ==
German Commissioner Wilhelm Ucher was responsible for the editorial board, followed by Croatian Jurica Oršić Slavetićki; for the last two years, Croatian writer Milan Ogrizović was the editor in chief.

The only Serbian associate writer was Borisav Stanković who took the position after his release from an internment camp at the invitation of Ogrizović and wrote literary feuilletons from December 1916 to March 1918. Austrian writer Otto Alscher wrote a literary column and co-edited the occupation newspaper anonymously. (Note: His contributions, printed anonymously at the time, were identified in the 1970s.)
