= Temes-class monitor =

Class of Austro-Hungarian river monitor warships

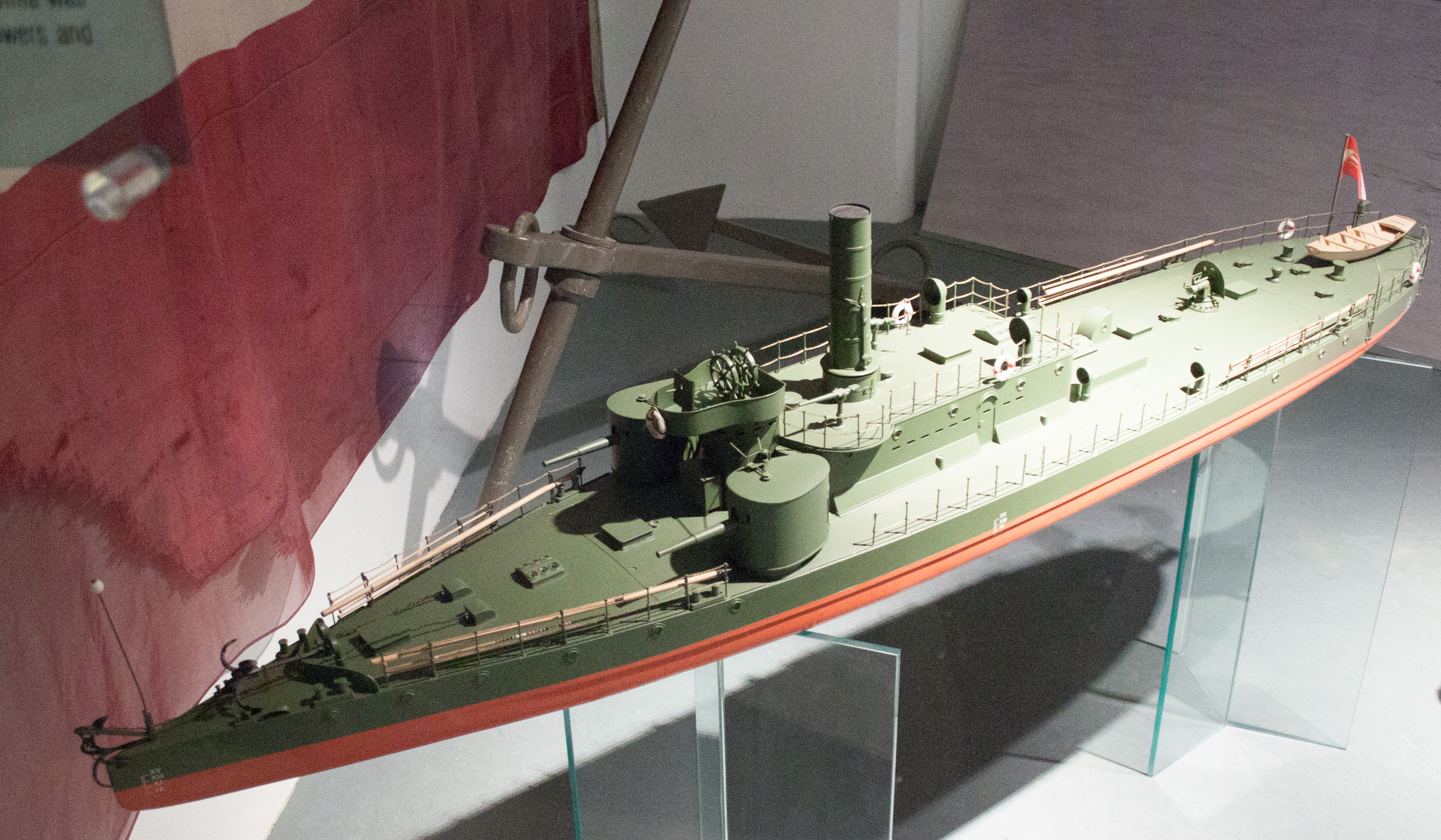
- A model of SMS Temes at the Heeresgeschichtliches Museum Wien

Class overview
- Name: Temes class
- Builders: United Schoenichen-Hartmann Shipyard
- Operators: Austro-Hungarian Navy
- Built: 1903–1904
- In service: 1904–1962
- Completed: 2
- Retired: 2
- Scrapped: 1
- Preserved: 1

General characteristics
- Type: River monitor
- Displacement: 440 tonnes (430 long tons)
- Length: 57.7 m (189 ft 4 in)
- Beam: 9.5 m (31 ft 2 in)
- Draught: 1.2 m (3 ft 11 in)
- Installed power: 1,400 ihp (1,000 kW); 2 Yarrow water-tube boilers
- Propulsion: 2 triple-expansion steam engines
- Speed: 13 knots (24 km/h; 15 mph)
- Complement: 86 officers and enlisted
- Armament: 2 × 120 mm (4.7 in)/L35 guns (2 × 1); 1 × 120 mm (4.7 in)/L10 howitzer; 2 × 37 mm (1.5 in) guns
- Armour: Belt and bulkheads: 40 mm (1.6 in); Deck: 25 mm (0.98 in); Conning tower: 75 mm (3.0 in); Gun turrets: 40 mm (1.6 in)

The Temes class consisted of two river monitors built for the Austro-Hungarian Navy that saw service during World War I. A notable member was Bodrog (later the Yugoslav monitor Sava).

== Description ==
They were armed with two 120 mm (4.7 in)L/35 (Note: L/35 denotes the length of the gun. In this case, the L/35 gun is calibre, meaning that the gun was 35 times as long as the diameter of its bore.) guns in single gun turrets, a single 120 mm (4.7 in)L/10 howitzer in a central pivot mount, and two 37 mm (1.5 in) guns. The maximum range of the Škoda 120 mm guns was 10 kilometres (6.2 mi), and the howitzer could fire its 20 kg (44 lb) shells a maximum of 6.2 km (3.9 mi). The armour consisted of belt, bulkheads and gun turrets 40 mm (1.6 in) thick, and deck armour 25 mm (0.98 in) thick. The armour on the conning tower was 75 mm (3.0 in) thick. The gun turrets also had armour 75 mm (3.0 in) thick.

== Ships ==
Ship name	Renamed	Launched	Commissioned	Decommissioned	Fate
SMS Temes	Drina, then Ardeal	26 March 1904	November 1904	November 1918	Assigned to Yugoslavia as Drina, December 1918; Transferred to Romania as Ardeal, April 1920
SMS Bodrog	Sava	12 April 1904	August 1904	November 1918	Sold to Yugoslavia as Sava, April 1920; currently a museum ship as of early 2019.

== Bibliography ==
- Frampton, Viktor; Sieche, Erwin & Stewart, Charles L. (2006). "Question 22/04: Austro-Hungarian Danube River Monitors". Warship International. XLIII (3): 239–243. ISSN 0043-0374.
- Greger, René (1976). Austro-Hungarian Warships of World War I. London: Allan. ISBN 978-0-7110-0623-2.
- Pawlik, Georg; Christ, Heinz; Winkler, Herbert (1989). Die K.u.K. Donauflottille 1870–1918 [The K.u.K. Danube Flotilla 1870–1918] (in German). Graz, Austria: H. Weishaupt Verlag. ISBN 978-3-900310-45-5.
