= Streifkorps =

- Active: 1813—1815; 1882—1891; 1908—1918
- Disbanded: 1918
- Country: Austria-Hungary Prussia
- Colors: light-blue uniform
- Engagements: Liberation Wars; Herzegovina Uprising (1882); World War I; Battle of Cer

A Streifkorps or Freikorps was a small unit, often composed of different military units, that was used to fight behind enemy lines and disrupt enemy lines of communication and reinforcement through guerilla tactics. Although this type of warfare was already used in the 17th and 18th centuries, the Prussian Streifkorps used in the Liberation Wars are well known. The term Streifkorps, also Steifkorps or Streifenkorps or Štrafuni (Serbian: Штрафуни) was later used to denote special counterinsurgency units in Austria-Hungarian controlled Bosnia and Herzegovina, composed of Muslims. They were established to fight against guerrilla warfare by the Chetniks using search and destroy tactics. Among the population of the region where they were active, Streifkorps were hated and had a very bad reputation.

== Napoleonic Wars ==
The Streifkorps were recruited from volunteer companies, attached to infantry and cavalry regiments; they comprised cavalry, infantry and sometimes artillery units, ranging in size from 100-150 men to several thousand. They operated as part of a Division or Corps, scouting the area and disrupting the enemy's movements. An example of such a Streifkorps was that of Major Friedrich August Peter von Colomb.

=== von Colomb's Streifkorps ===
Given the choice to form a squadron of volunteer Jägers, Friedrich August Peter von Colomb was assigned one officer and four NCO's from his Hussar Regiment, of which 10 hussars volunteered. He recruited his squadron from Neumark, all volunteers having to provide their own uniforms and equipment. It operated from April until June 1813, when, after a successful operation in which the Korps had among others captured an artillery park of 18 guns, six howitzers and all equipment, and 700 horses, Von Colomb and his command was destroyed in an ambush. Von Colomb and 14 others escaped, being awarded the Iron Cross, and given the command of a new Streifkorps in November, which consisted of infantry and cavalry. As part of Von Bülow's Prussian III Corps, he operated behind enemy lines in Flanders and Holland. Von Colomb is said to have brought "the Spanish Guerilla to Germany".

=== Black Brunswickers and Lützow Free Corps ===
Other famous Streifkorps were the Duke of Brunswick's "Black Horde" and the "Lützow Free Corps", which comprised infantry, cavalry and artillery, and was several thousand men strong. The Brunswick Corps was recruited by the Duke of Brunswick and at first clothed, armed and equipped by Austria. After being defeated by French troops and having to flee Germany, they escaped with the help of the Royal Navy and were from then on paid and equipped by Britain. The Corps fought successfully in Spain and later at Waterloo.

The Lützower Freikorps consisted of volunteers from all over Germany, appealing to the idea of a unified Germany. It fought successfully during the Liberation War in 1813-1814, and was afterwards incorporated into the Prussian army. The regiments formed from the Korps also fought at Waterloo. The black uniform with red trimmings and gold buttons would be the inspiration for the German flag.

== In the Austro-Hungarian Army ==
=== 19th century ===
The Streifkorps were first established during the Herzegovina Uprising of 1882 to fight against guerrilla rebels using search and destroy tactics. Among the regional population where they were active, Streifkorps were hated and had a very bad reputation. They were established at the end of 1882, in the border region toward Montenegro, Sandžak and Serbia. It was organised as soon as the Herzegovina 1882 Uprising reached serious dimensions. The proposal to establish Streifkorps came from the governor of Mostar in September 1882. After the uprising's defeat in 1881/82, the Streifkorps were engaged as mobile surveillance force until 1888 when their number was first reduced. In 1891 they were completely dissolved, with the assigned soldiers returning to their regiments or to the Bosnian-Herzegovinian gendarmerie corps.

==== Equipment ====
The Streifkorps carried only personal arms and small amount of equipment in their backpack, while reserves of ammunition and equipment were strategically placed in guarded secret places in the wilderness. They were the first military units in the world to carry backpacks. The colour of their uniform was light-blue.

=== 20th century ===
It was reestablished in October 1908, in context of demonstrations in Serbia and in Montenegro against Annexation of Bosnia and Herzegovina.

In February 1912, each company of the Austrian garrisons in Bosnia had to give up to 45 men to join Streifkorps, while each battalion had to give one officer. At the beginning of the Battle of Cer, Streifkorps units crossed the Drina together with other Austro-Hungarian units to invade Serbia. They participated in the looting of Belgrade and the imprisonment of its population when Austria-Hungary captured it in 1915.

== World War II ==
The punishment platoons established against the secret order of the Croatian government to slaughter, burn and exterminate all Serbs, and rebellious Croats and Muslims, were referred to as Štrafuni platoons.

== Sources ==
- Velikonja, Mitja (2003). Religious Separation and Political Intolerance in Bosnia-Herzegovina. College Station, Texas: Texas A&M University Press. ISBN 978-1-58544-226-3.
- Velikonja, Mitja (1 January 1998). Bosanski religijski mozaiki: religije in nacionalne mitologije v zgodovini Bosne in Hercegovine. Znanstveno in publicistično središče. ISBN 978-961-6294-04-1.
- Holbach, Maude M. (1910). Bosnia and Herzegovina: Some Wayside Wanderings. J. Lane.
- Društvo (1982). Godišnjak Društva istoričara Bosne i Hercegovine: Annuaire de la Société historique de Bosnie et Herzégovine. Društvo istoričara Bosne i Hercegovine.
- Hadžibegović, Iljas (1991). Bosanskohercegovački gradovi na razmeđu 19. i 20. stolječa. Oslobođenje Public. ISBN 9788631902429.
- Sarajevo, Drustvo Istoricara Bosne i Hercegovine (1950). Godisnjak.
- Andrić, Ivo (1988). Sabrana dela Ive Andrića: Na Drini ćuprija. Prosveta.
- Ćemerlić, Hamdija (1983). Colloque Scientifique à l'Occasion du Centenaire de l'Insurrection en Herzegovine 1882. Akad. Nauka i Umjetnosti Bosne i Hercegovine.
- akademija (1985). Dokumenti o spoljnoj politici Kraljevine Srbije: sv. 2 15. Srpska akademija nauka i umetnosti.
- Ljubibratić, Dragoslav (1959). Gavrilo Princip. Nolit.
- Pahl, Magnus (2009). Am Rande Europas?: der Balkan - Raum und Bevölkerung als Wirkungsfelder militärischer Gewalt. Oldenbourg. ISBN 978-3-486-59154-5.
- Pavlović, Živko G. (1924). Bitka na Jadru, avgusta 1914 god. Grafički zavod Makarije.
- Đurić, Antonije (1987). Za čast otadžbine: kako se Beograd borio u prvom svetskom ratu. NIRO "Književne novine". ISBN 9788639100780.
- Rothenberg, Gunther E. (1998). The Army of Francis Joseph. Purdue University Press. ISBN 978-1-55753-145-2.
