= Bulgaria–Germany treaty (1915) =

Treaty between Germany and Bulgaria

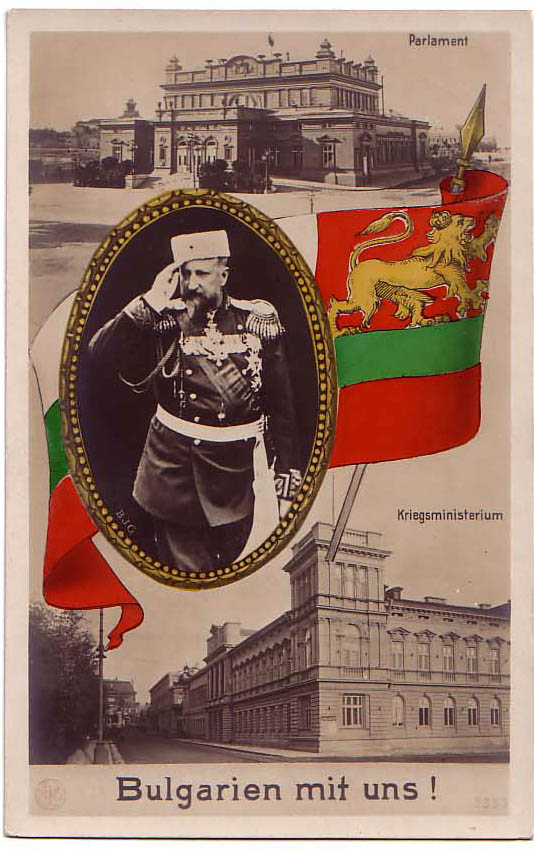
Bulgaria with us – A German postcard commemorating the entering of Bulgaria in the war.

The Treaty for friendship and alliance between Bulgaria and Germany was a secret military treaty signed on 6 September (24 August O.S.) 1915 between the Kingdom of Bulgaria and the German Empire, establishing an alliance between the two powers. Besides aligning Bulgaria with the Central Powers, the treaty granted Bulgaria territorial expansion towards Serbia.
