= Borisav Stanković =

Serbian writer (1876–1927)

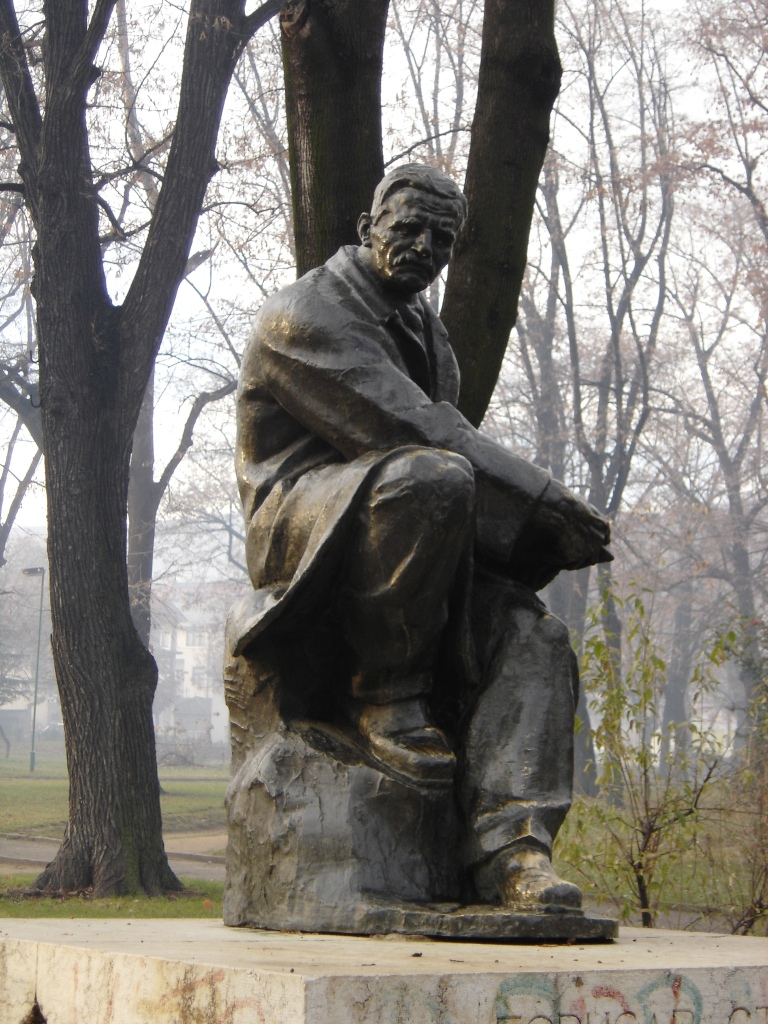
- Stanković's statue in Vranje
- Born: Борисав Станковић; 22 March 1876; Vranje, Kosovo Vilayet, Ottoman Empire
- Died: 22 October 1927 (aged 51); Belgrade, Kingdom of Serbs, Croats and Slovenes
- Resting place: Belgrade's New Cemetery
- Other name: Bora (Serbian Cyrillic: Бора)
- Education: Faculty of Law, University of Belgrade
- Occupations: Writer, Tax collector
- Spouse: Angelina Stanković (nee Milutinović)
- Children: 3 daughters
- Writing career
- Language: Serbian language, also Prizren–Timok dialect (part of Torlakian dialects)
- Period: Serbian realism
- Genre: Realism

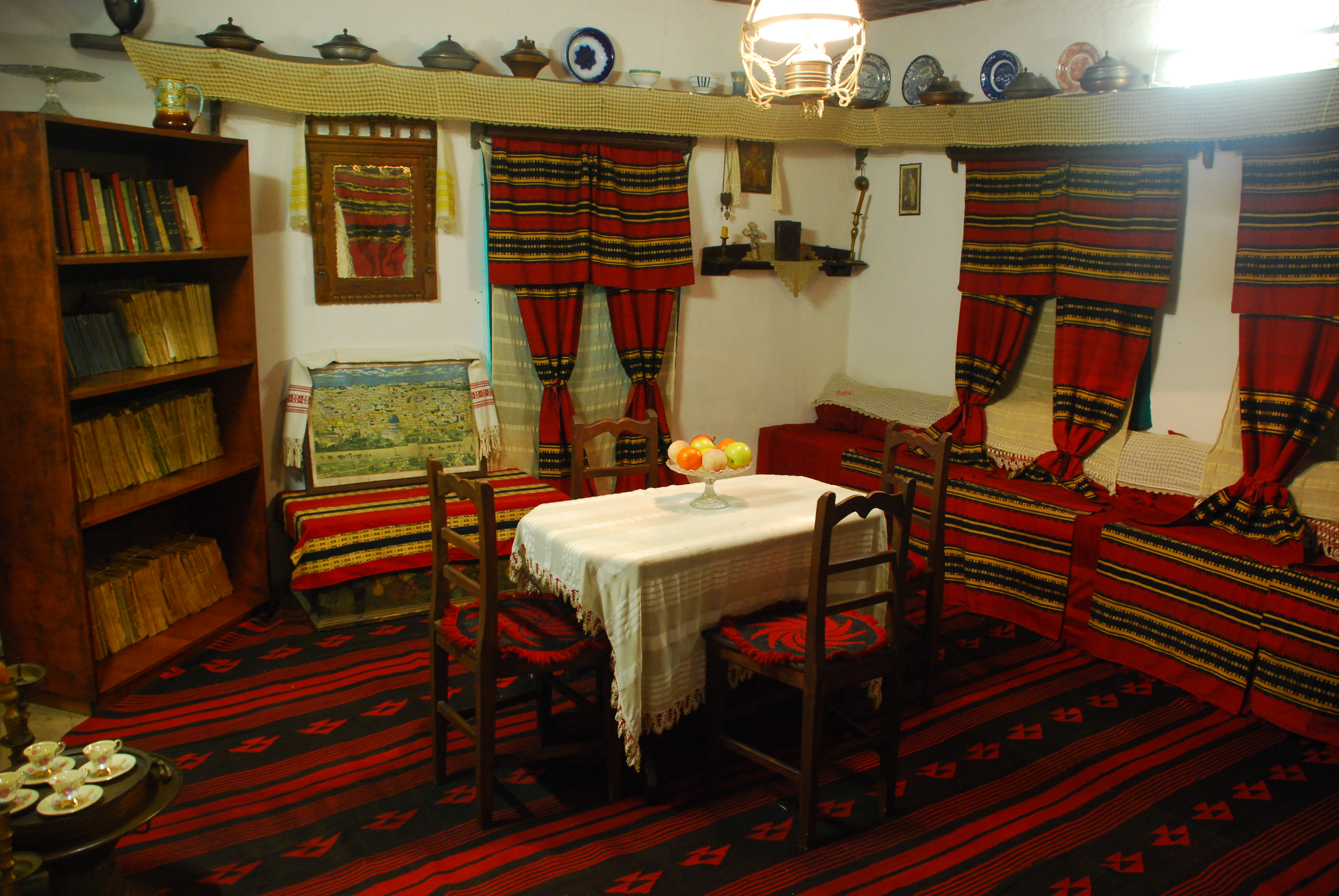
Interior of the house in which Stanković was born

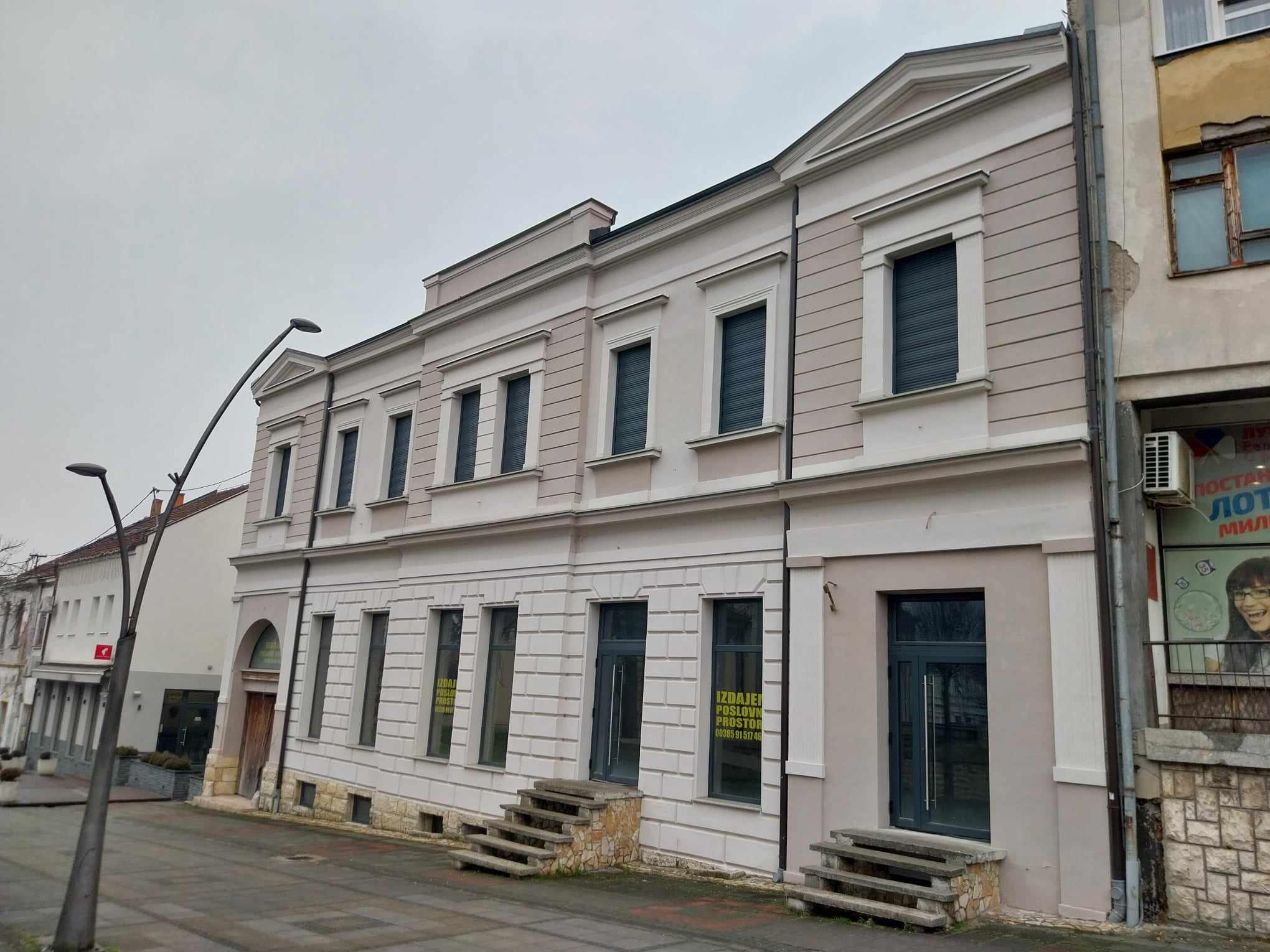
The building where Borisav Stanković lived 1916 in Derventa

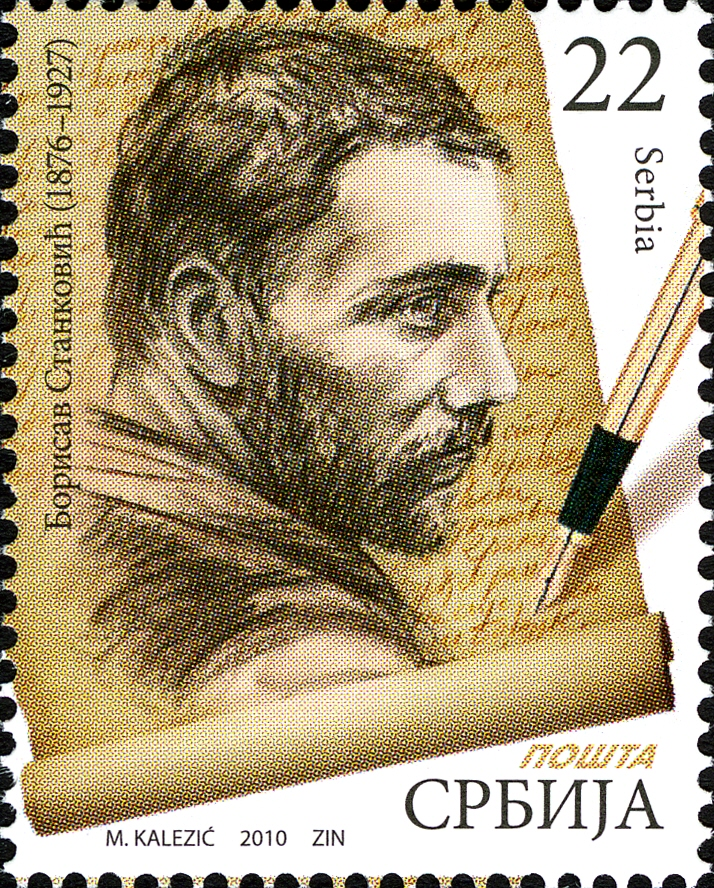
Borisav Stanković on a 2010 Serbian stamp

Borisav "Bora" Stanković (Serbian Cyrillic: Борисав "Бора" Станковић; 22 March 1876 – 22 October 1927) was a Serbian writer belonging to the school of realism. His novels and short stories depict the life of people from South Serbia. He belongs to an exceptional group of storytellers that appeared at the turn of the 20th century, Ivo Ćipiko, Petar Kočić, Milutin Uskoković, Svetolik Ranković, Veljko Milićević and others.

== Biography ==
He completed the primary and secondary school in Vranje, and graduated from the University of Belgrade's Law School. It is said that he received some Western education—Paris—but returned unaffected to his native soil and subsequently immortalized it in his work. He worked as a clerk (first customs official then tax official) in Belgrade. During World War I he resided in Niš, then in Montenegro where he was captured by the Austrians and incarcerated in a PoW camp in Derventa in Bosnia. After returning to Belgrade from internment, at the invitation of the Croatian writer Milan Ogrizović, he agreed to write literary feuilletons for the occupation newspaper Beogradske Novine. After the war he worked in the Department of Arts of the Ministry of Education. He died at Belgrade on 22 October 1927.

== Work ==
Borisav Stanković's best work is the 1910 novel entitled Impure Blood (Nečista krv) about the plight of a young woman unable to free herself from the old customs and restrictions. In this story he explored the contradictions of man's spiritual and sensory life. This was the first Serbian novel to receive praise in its foreign translations from international literary critics. At the turn of the 20th century folk musicals became popular and the best play of this genre is Stanković's Koštana, written in 1902. Its bittersweet story of a beautiful Gypsy girl and her amorous conquest of an entire provincial town is intertwined with quasi-philosophical musing about the meaning of life and the passing of youth. Stanković's other play, Tašana, written in 1910, is also about provincial life in southern Serbia, which had just been liberated from the Turks but was still living under the imprint of the centuries-long occupation. In practically all his works Stanković presents strong characters who are at the same time victims of a strange weakness stemming from the realization that their time has irrevocably passed.

It is said that he is the most important late Serbian realist, who interconnected poetic and narrative procedures in a complex manner and departed so significantly from realist canon that his prose is regarded as transitional.

His other main works are: short story collections, Iz starog jevandjelja (From an Old Gospel, 1899), Stari dani (The Old Days, 1902), and Božji ljudi (God's Children, 1902); and a play Tašana (1910).

Literary critic Jovan Skerlić in his 1914 literary history of Serbia (Istorija nove srpske književnosti) wrote the following about him:

Borisav Stanković takes the first place among the modern Serbian writers. ... Before Borisav Stanković Serbian literature was limited to the northern and western Serbian regions. Stanković first introduced in the literature the southeastern Serbian lands, that part of Old Serbia which Serbia liberated in 1877–1878. He is a bard of that new picturesque and interesting exotic world, of his birthplace Vranja where he spent his childhood, that left the strongest and unforgettable memories and from which, in his stories, he cannot be set free. He does not sing about the present Vranja which is modernised but about Vranja of the 'old days', the patriarchal people, with their narrow views but cordial life. He describes what he saw and felt, he usually describes people who really existed and events that really happened. ... There is in his description of Vranja life something very much 'Vranjanian', local, interesting archaic Serbian dialect. Moreover, in all this realistic description of one of the Serbian nooks where many archaic and patriarchal elements are still preserved, there is also something very personal, impressionistic, lyrical ... In all his stories in which a struggle is going on between East and West, between the personality and the masses, passion and moral, dream and reality, poetry and prose of life, in all these things to which he could give magnitude and verse, Stanković always participates with all his open soul.

== Legacy ==
Bora Stanković's literary work plays a key role in the story that the people of Vranje tell about themselves. They say he is "our Bora". Many have his collected works at home and do not like the newspapers and free interpretations of his works. Many important institutions in the city bear his name, or the names of his literary heroes.

As an annual ceremony in honor of the writer, "Borina nedelja" (Bora's Week) is organized (established in 1967, and since 1976, beginning on March 23, the day after the writer's birth), then "Borini pozorišni dani" and a different world culture. In 1954, it was erected in the city park of the monument to Bora Stanković, and in 1964 the municipality bought his house from the new owners and in 1967 it officially opened as a museum-house. The symbolization of local identity with the help of Bora Stanković was especially important from the moment "Bora's Week" was established.

== In popular culture ==
- Bora during occupation, a television film based on the biography of Borisav Stankovic and directed by Miško Milojević, was produced in 2006 by the Serbian broadcasting service RTS.

== Bibliography ==
=== Books ===
- Majka na grobu svoga jedinca, a poem, 1894.
- Iz starog jevanđelja, 1899.
- Koštana, „Komad iz vranjskog života u četiri čina s pevanjem“, 1902.
- Božji ljudi, 1902.
- Stari dani, 1902.
- Koštana, 1905.
- Pokojnikova žena, 1907.
- Nečista krv, 1910.
- Njegova Belka, 1921.
- Drame, 1928.
- Pod okupacijom, 1929.
- Sabrana dela, I—II, 1956.
- Gazda Mladen, 1928.

=== Short stories ===
- Baba Stana (1907)
- Bekče (1901)
- Biljarica (1902)
- Copa (1902)
- Č'a Mihailo (1902)
- Đurđevdan (1898)
- Jovan (1902)
- Jovča (1901)
- Jovo-to (1909)
- Ludi Stevan (1902)
- Ljuba i Naza (1902)
- Mace (1902)
- Manasije (1902)
- Marko (1902)
- Menko (1902)
- Mitka (1902)
- Moj zemljak (1909)
- Naš Božić (1900)
- Nuška (1899)
- Njegova Belka (1920)
- Oni (1901)
- Paraputa (1902)
- Pokojnikova žena (1902)
- Rista krijumčar (1905)
- Stanko „Čisto brašno“ (1902)
- Stanoja (1898)
- Stari dani (1900)
- Stari Vasilije (1906)
- Stevan Čuklja (1906)
- Taja (1901)
- Tetka Zlata (1909)
- U noći (1899)
- Uvela ruža (iz dnevnika) (1899)
- U vinogradima (1899)
- Zadušnica (1902)

== See also ==
- Bora Stanković Gymnasium, Vranje
