= Hermann Kövess von Kövessháza =

Commander-in-Chief of the Austro-Hungarian Army

Generalfeldmarschall baron Hermann Kövess de Kövessháza
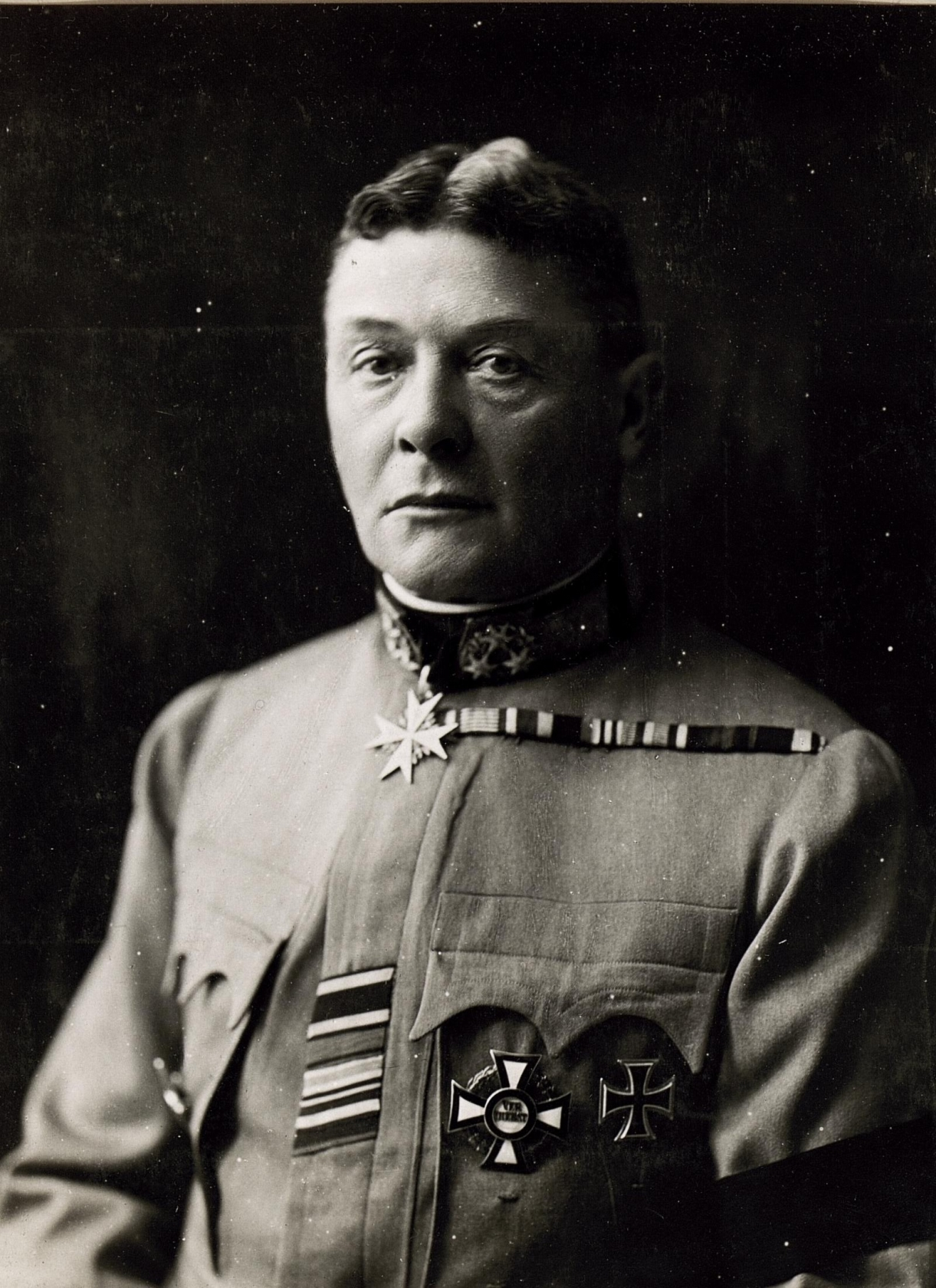

Supreme Commander of the Imperial and Royal Armed Forces
- In office 4 November 1918 – 1 December 1918
- Monarch: Charles I
- Deputy: Arthur Arz von Straußenburg
- Preceded by: Charles I
- Succeeded by: Position abolished

Army Commander-in-chief of Austria-Hungary
- In office 4 November 1918 – 11 November 1918
- Monarch: Charles I
- Deputy: Arthur Arz
- Preceded by: Arthur Arz
- Succeeded by: Position abolished

Military Governor of Serbia
- In office 28 October 1918 – 1 November 1918
- Monarch: Charles I
- Minister-President of Austria: Max Hussarek von Heinlein; Heinrich Lammasch
- Reich Minister of War: Rudolf Stöger-Steiner von Steinstätten
- Chief of the General Staff: Arthur Arz
- Preceded by: Adolf von Rhemen
- Succeeded by: Position abolished

Governor-general of Montenegro
- In office 14 January – 29 February 1916
- Monarch: Franz Joseph I
- Minister-President of Austria: Karl von Stürgkh
- Reich Minister of War: Alexander von Krobatin
- Chief of the General Staff: Franz Conrad von Hötzendorf
- Preceded by: Position established
- Succeeded by: Viktor Weber Edler von Webenau

Personal details
- Born: 30 March 1854 Temesvár, Kingdom of Hungary, Austrian Empire (now Timișoara, Romania)
- Died: 22 September 1924 (aged 70) Vienna, First Austrian Republic
- Resting place: Kerepesi Cemetery, Budapest
- Spouse: Eugenie Hye von Glunek
- Education: Imperial and Royal Technical Military Academy

Military service
- Allegiance: Austria-Hungary
- Branch/service: Austro-Hungarian Army
- Years of service: 1865–1918
- Rank: Generalfeldmarschall (Field Marshal)
- Battles/wars: Herzegovina uprising (1878); World War I; Italian front; Eastern front; Gorlice–Tarnów offensive; Brusilov offensive; Kerensky offensive; Balkan campaign; Serbian campaign; Montenegrin campaign

Hermann Albin Josef Freiherr Kövess von Kövessháza (Hungarian: kövessházi báró Kövess Hermann; 30 March 1854 – 22 September 1924) was the final, and completely ceremonial, Commander-in-Chief of the Austro-Hungarian Army. He served as a generally competent and unremarkable commander in the Austro-Hungarian Army and was close to retirement in 1914. It was during this time when the First World War broke out and he was given a command post.

== Personal life ==
Kövess' father was a senior military officer living in Temesvár, Kingdom of Hungary, Austrian Empire (now Timișoara, Romania). His mother came from Fogaras (now Făgăraș, Romania), where her Thuringian father worked as a pharmacist; her mother was a Transylvanian Saxon from Hermannstadt (now Sibiu, Romania). He married the Baroness Eugenie Hye von Glunek in 1892 and they had 3 sons; Adalbert, who was killed in action in 1914 and Géza and Jenő who served as artillery officers.

== Military career ==
He enrolled into a cadet institute at Hainburg in 1865, and, after spending some time there and at the academy in Znojmo, he moved to the Imperial and Royal Technical Military Academy in Vienna in 1869. He passed the courses at the academy with fair success and received an accelerated promotion to captain. He graduated in 1872.

He led his first military expedition in 1882 on a mission to suppress a mutiny in Dalmatia and was commended by the Emperor Francis Joseph I of Austria with a Merit Medal and also received a Knights Cross of the Order of the Italian Crown that same year. After the campaign he failed his next examination and was transferred into the infantry. His good performance during his service with the infantry provided him with quick promotions to major in 1890 and then to lieutenant colonel in 1894. Soon after, he was promoted to colonel in 1896.

He was promoted to the rank of Major General in October 1902 and Lieutenant Field Marshal on 1 November 1907. He had taken command of the 12th Corps in Nagyszeben by 24 June 1911. He was promoted to the rank of General of the Infantry in 1911.

He had become one of the youngest colonels in the Austro-Hungarian Army and one of the most powerful Protestants serving in a generally Roman Catholic officer corps. His Protestantism caused a scandal when he was involved in an event where 400 Roman Catholics converted to Protestantism after a dispute. The scandal was generally ignored by the military, but condemned by the Catholic Church. The condemnation led him to believe he would be prematurely retired; however, this turned out to be false due to the onset of World War I.

=== World War I ===
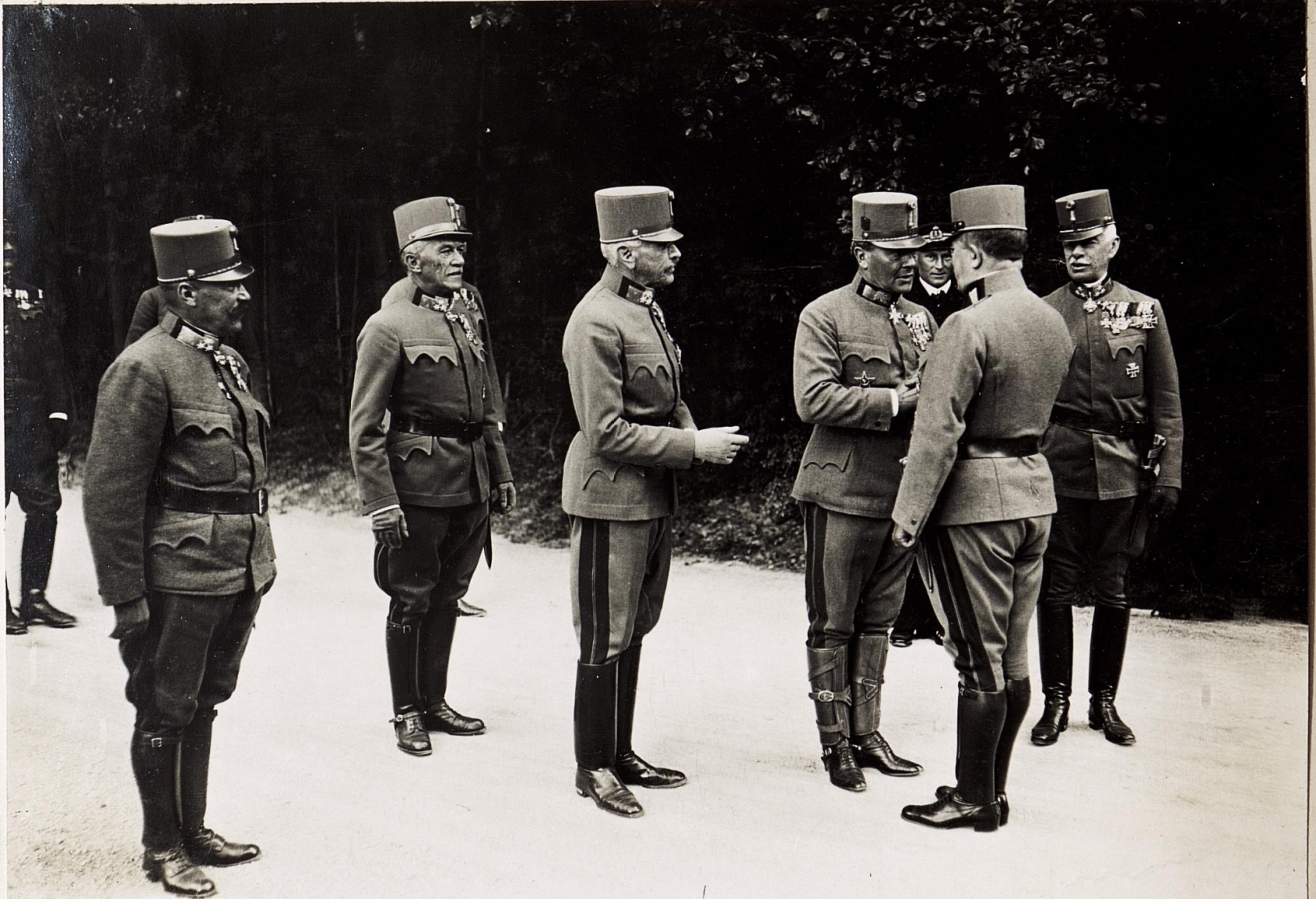
Kövess (fourth from right) shaking hands with Arthur Arz von Straußenburg during the 180th investiture in the history of the Military Order of Maria Theresa on 17 August 1917 at Schloss Wartholz

At the beginning of World War I, Kövess commanded the XII. (Transylvania) Corps, and fought in the tenacious defense against the superior Russian forces in east and central Galicia, and later in Russian Poland. During the spring offensive of 1915, he captured by storm the fortress of Ivangorod. In the autumn, under the command of August von Mackensen, he led the III. Army during the Serbian Campaign, with which he captured Belgrade and penetrated deep into Serbia. In January 1916, in independent command, he overthrew Montenegro in the Montenegrin Campaign, and also occupied Albania.

In the early summer of 1916, Kövess' army cooperated in the operation against Arsiero-Asiago. But after the breakthrough of Aleksei Brusilov, he was transported in all haste to the Galician theatre of war. Kövess soon after took over the command of the VII. Army, and defended the ridges of the Wooded Carpathians against Russian attack.

In the summer of 1917, Kövess sallied from the mountains with his troops, made himself master of Czernowitz and Radautz, and drove the Russians almost entirely from the Bukovina. He was promoted to the rank of Field Marshal on 5 November 1917. From the middle of January to the beginning of April 1918, he commanded the army front consisting of the I. and VII. Armies, extending from the Dniester to the south-eastern corner of Transylvania.

Entrusted after the withdrawal of Bulgaria with the thankless task of the command of the troops in the Balkans, Kövess could do nothing more than arrange for the evacuation of the occupied territories according to plan, and for the defence of the Danube-Sava line. When Emperor Charles laid down the supreme command, he nominated Kövess as his successor. But the dispersal of the forces closed Kövess's military career.

From November 1918 to 20 December 1918, Kövess was Supreme Commander of the Imperial and Royal Armed Forces until the dissolution of the Austro-Hungarian Army Higher Command.

Kövess was one of the most popular army leaders of the old monarchy. After its downfall, he lived in retirement, cultivating his historical and artistic tastes. He died in Vienna in 1924.

== Awards ==
- Order of the Cross of Takovo 2nd class, 1900

== Sources ==
- DiNardo, Richard L. (2015). Invasion: The Conquest of Serbia, 1915. Santa Barbara: Praeger. ISBN 9781440800924.
