= Karl von Pflanzer-Baltin =

Austro-Hungarian general

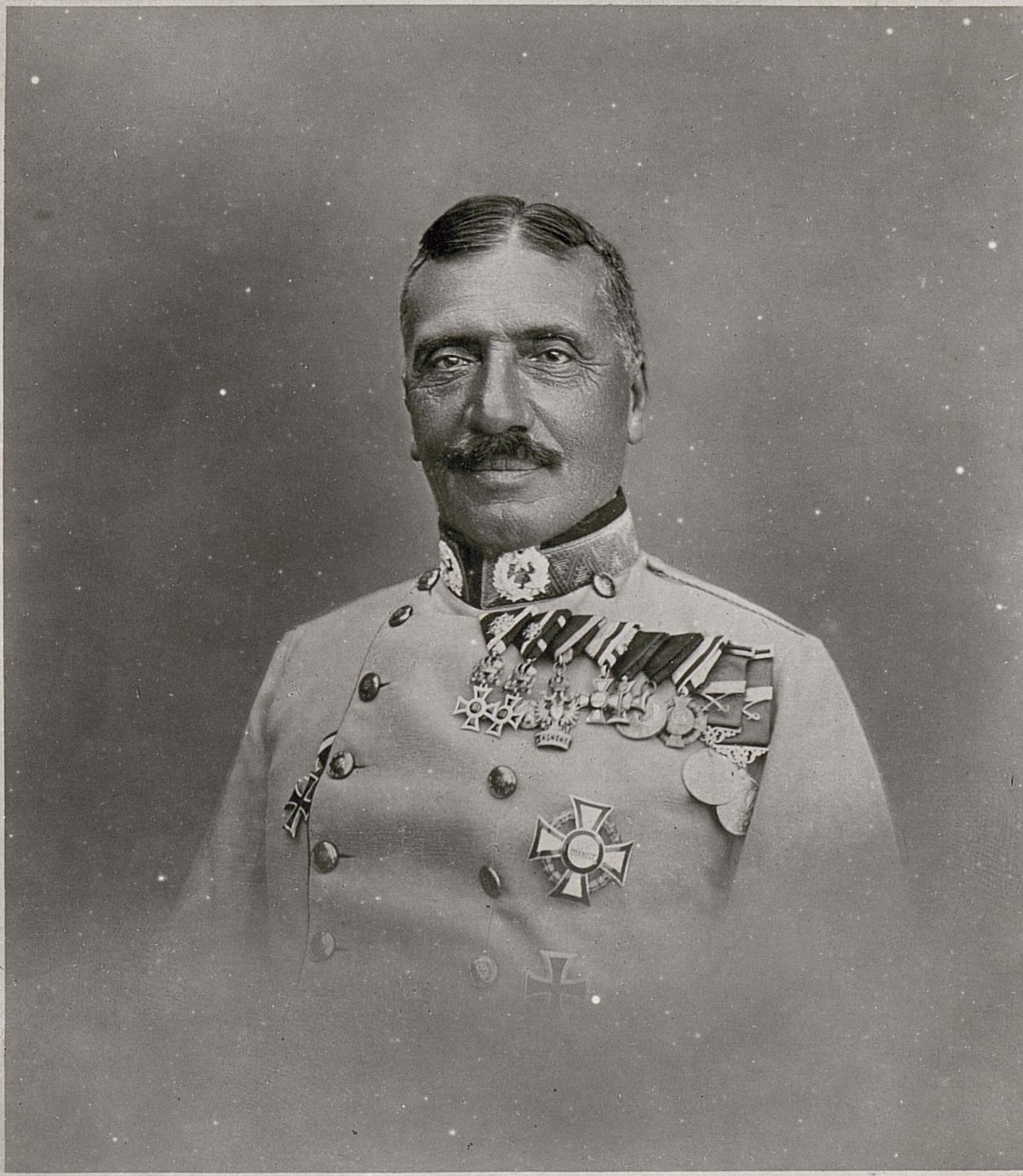
- Born: 1 June 1855; Pécs, Austrian Empire
- Died: 8 April 1925 (aged 69); Vienna, First Austrian Republic
- Military career
- Allegiance: Austria-Hungary
- Branch: Austro-Hungarian Army
- Service years: 1871–1918
- Rank: Colonel general
- Commands: 7th Army
- Conflicts: World War I: Brusilov Offensive; Macedonian Front
- Awards: Military Order of Maria Theresa more…

4th Governor-General of the Military General Government of Montenegro
- In office 12 October – 4 November 1918
- Monarch: Charles I of Austria
- Minister-President of Austria: Max Hussarek von Heinlein; Heinrich Lammasch
- Reich Minister of War: Max Hussarek von Heinlein; Heinrich Lammasch
- Chief of the General Staff: Arthur Arz von Straußenburg
- Preceded by: Heinrich Clam-Martinic
- Succeeded by: Position abolished Dragutin Milutinović (as Serbian Governor of Montenegro)

Karl Freiherr von Pflanzer-Baltin (1 June 1855, Pécs, Austrian Empire – 8 April 1925, Vienna) was an Austro-Hungarian general who was active in World War I.

== Biography ==
Pflanzer-Baltin became General of Cavalry from October 1912 and he served on the general staff, but in 1914 he was unattached, due to precarious health. It was only in the autumn of that year, when Romania appeared to be turning against the Central Powers, that he was charged with the defense of Transylvania.

In 1915, the Stavka attempted to cross the Carpathians, and invade Hungary. Pflanzer-Baltin was able to hold his position along the Carpathian Front. According to Prit Buttar, "Had his 'army group' been dislodged and driven back, the German South Army too would have been forced to retreat, conceivably followed by the entire line of forces in the Carpathians." Pflanzer-Baltin was awarded the Commander's Cross of the Military Order of Maria Theresa as a consequence.

He was promoted to Colonel-General in 1916. After fighting with varying success in the southern part of Eastern Galicia and in the Bukovina the 7th Army under his command was driven back by Aleksei Brusilov's offensive in June 1916, whereupon he was relieved of his command.

Pflanzer-Baltin became General Inspector of the infantry in 1917 and subsequently Supreme Commander of Austro-Hungarian infantry in Albania.

In the summer of 1918, the Austro-Hungarian front in Albania yielded before the attack of the Entente army. Pflanzer-Baltin, entrusted with the command in this theatre of operations, won back, after a brief attack, the old positions south of Fjeri and Berat — the last notable success of the Austro-Hungarian Army in the field.

== Decorations and awards ==
- Military Merit Cross (Austria-Hungary)
- Order of the Iron Crown (Austria)
- Knight's Cross of the Order of Leopold (Austria)
- Order of Leopold, 1st class, and Imperial Counsellor (Geheimrat) (December 1914)
- Commander's Cross of the Military Order of Maria Theresa
- Grand Cross of the Order of Leopold (Austria)
- Decoration for Services to the Red Cross
- Iron Cross of 1914, 1st and 2nd class
- Military Merit Cross, 1st class (1916)
- Master of Skirmish Warfare
- Large Military Merit Medal with Swords ("Signum Laudis" Austria-Hungary)
- Gallipoli Star ("Iron Crescent", Ottoman Empire)
- Grand Cross of the Order of Saint Stephen of Hungary
