= Austro-Hungarian occupation of Montenegro =

1916–1918 military occupation

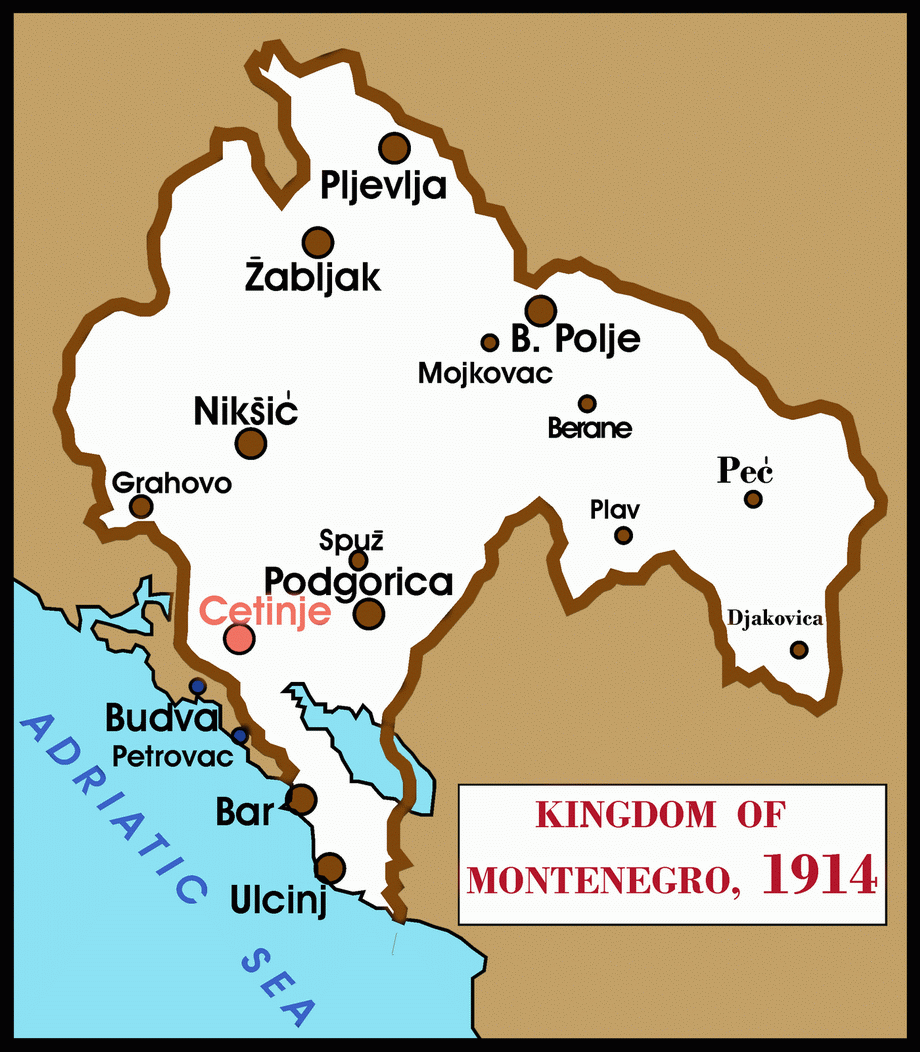
Kingdom of Montenegro in 1914

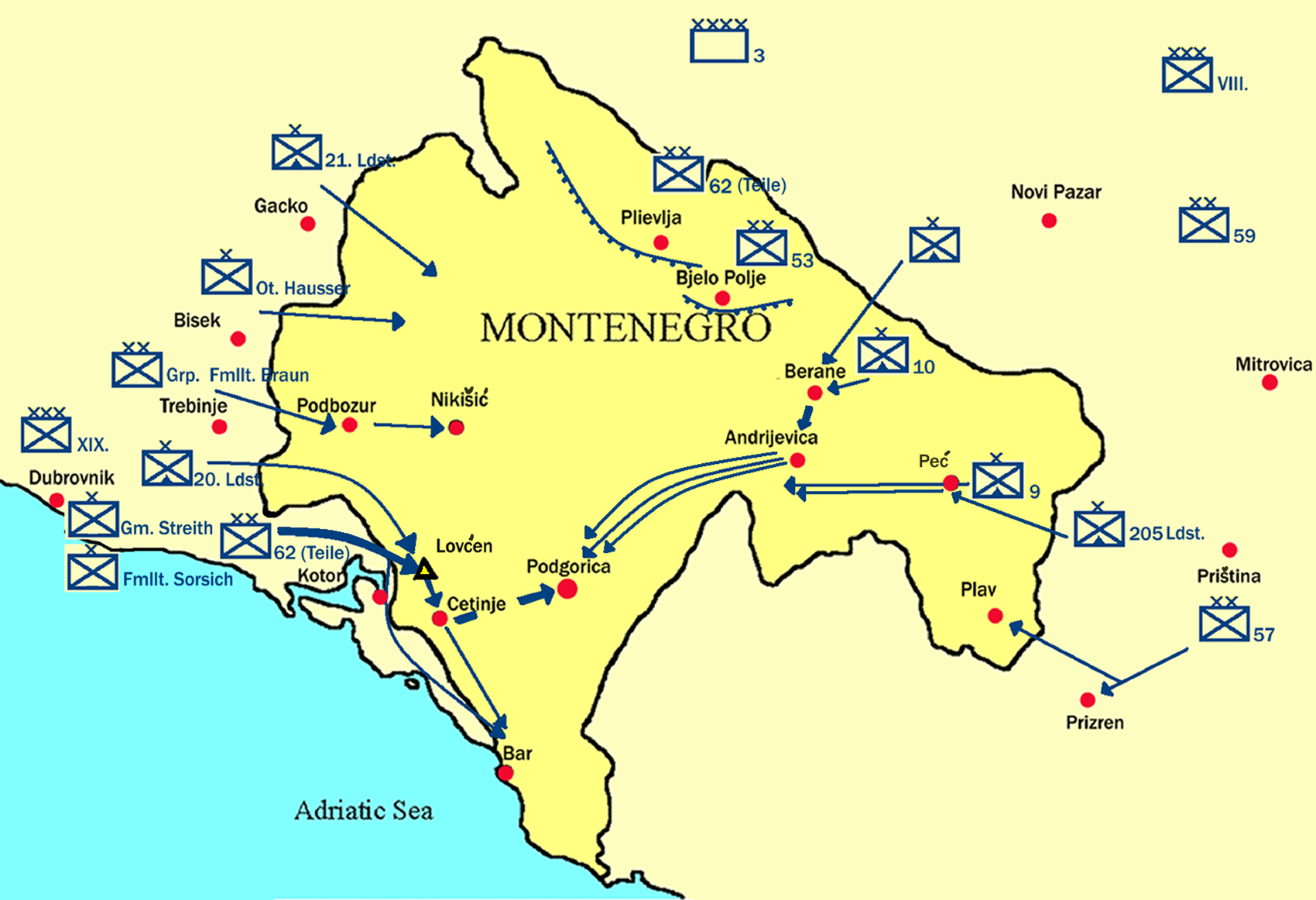
Occupation of the Kingdom of Montenegro by the Central Powers in 1916

The Austro-Hungarian occupation of Montenegro (officially the Military General Government of Montenegro) was a military occupation of the Kingdom of Montenegro by Austria-Hungary during World War I, which lasted from 1916 to 1918.

== History ==
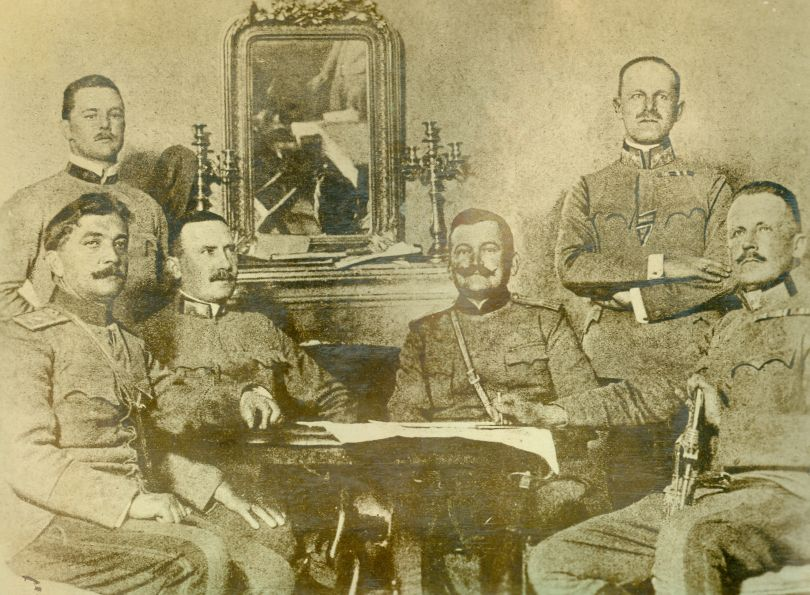
Signing of the capitulation of Montenegro on January 23, 1916

On August 9, 1914, the Kingdom of Montenegro entered the First World War on the side of the Triple Entente. The country fought together with the Kingdom of Serbia against Austria-Hungary. Following Bulgaria's entry into the war on October 15, 1915 and the complete occupation of Serbia by the Central Powers in December 1915, Austria-Hungary began its campaign in Montenegro on January 6, 1916 against the parts of the Serbian army that had retreated into the country. On January 16, the whole of Montenegro was occupied and capitulated on January 23. King Nikola I and his government fled into exile via Italy to France.

The Austro-Hungarian occupying power set up a General Government, based on the model in Serbia, which was also occupied. The occupation lasted until the end of the First World War in November 1918, after which the country became part of what would later become the Kingdom of Yugoslavia.

In response to Austrian plans to leave Montenegro as a reduced satellite state, roughly within the borders of 1878, the German Secretary of State for Foreign Affairs Gottlieb von Jagow said that they wanted to mutilate Montenegro in such a way that "only a barren heap of stones, not viable", would remain. Chief of the Austro-Hungarian General Staff Franz Conrad von Hötzendorf demanded complete annexation, or Montenegro should "lose its effective independence" and retain "only a fictitious sovereignty". The Montenegrin western border was to be shifted so far (line north-western tip of Lake Skadar-Podbožur-Goransko) that even the capital Cetinje would no longer be located on the territory of the shrunken rest of Montenegro. However, this demand, which was tantamount to annexation, was rejected by Foreign Minister Stephan Burián von Rajecz and Emperor Franz Joseph I so as not to make possible peace with other states more difficult. The historian Gerhard Ritter saw the unsuccessful attempts at special peace with Serbia and Montenegro as a "planned peace by force", which shows that "even more so in Austria" there was a willingness to "ruthlessly exploit military victories to expand power, without asking much about the 'opinion of the world' and the extension of the war".

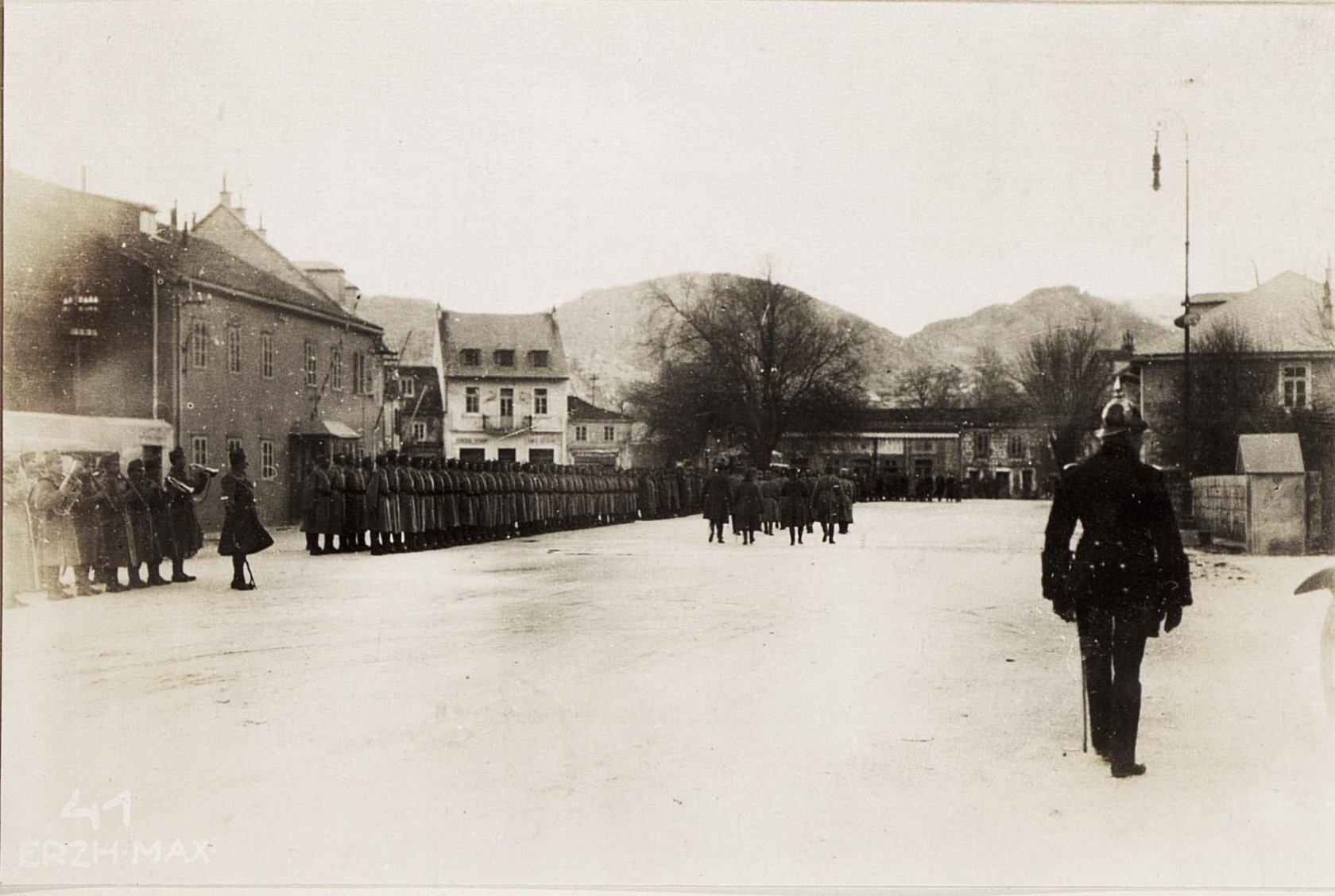
Austro-Hungarian parade in Cetinje

To control the mountainous, impassable country, the Austro-Hungarian military administration needed over 40,000 troops. With over 40,000 men, the military administration needed more than twice as many occupation troops as for Serbia. There was also a guerrilla movement from the beginning of 1918. Economically, the General-Gouvernement was no gain for the occupying power; the country could barely feed itself.

Montenegro lost 20,000 soldiers in the war, which was 40% of all mobilized soldiers and 10% of the total population. Other figures even speak of 39,000 dead and a 16% total losses, making Montenegro the most severely affected participant in the war.

=== Governors-General ===
No.	Portrait	Governor-general	Took office	Left office	Time in office	Defence branch
1	Hermann Kövess	Hermann Kövess (1862–1940)	14 January 1916	26 February 1916	43 days	Austro-Hungarian Army
2	Viktor Weber Edler	Viktor Weber Edler (1861–1932)	26 February 1916	10 July 1917	1 year, 134 days	Austro-Hungarian Army
3	Heinrich Clam-Martinic	Heinrich Clam-Martinic (1863–1932)	10 July 1917	12 October 1918	1 year, 94 days	none
4	Karl von Pflanzer-Baltin	Karl von Pflanzer-Baltin (1855–1925)	12 October 1918	4 November 1918	23 days	Austro-Hungarian Army

== Literature ==
- Heiko Brendel: „Lieber als Kacake als an Hunger sterben“: Besatzung und Widerstand im k.u.k. Militärgeneralgouvernement in Montenegro (1916-1918) (= Krieg und Konflikt. Band 5). Campus, Frankfurt 2019, ISBN 978-3-593-51035-4

== See also ==
- History of Montenegro
