= Montenegrin campaign =

1916 invasion of Montenegro during WWI

- Part of the Serbian campaign of World War I
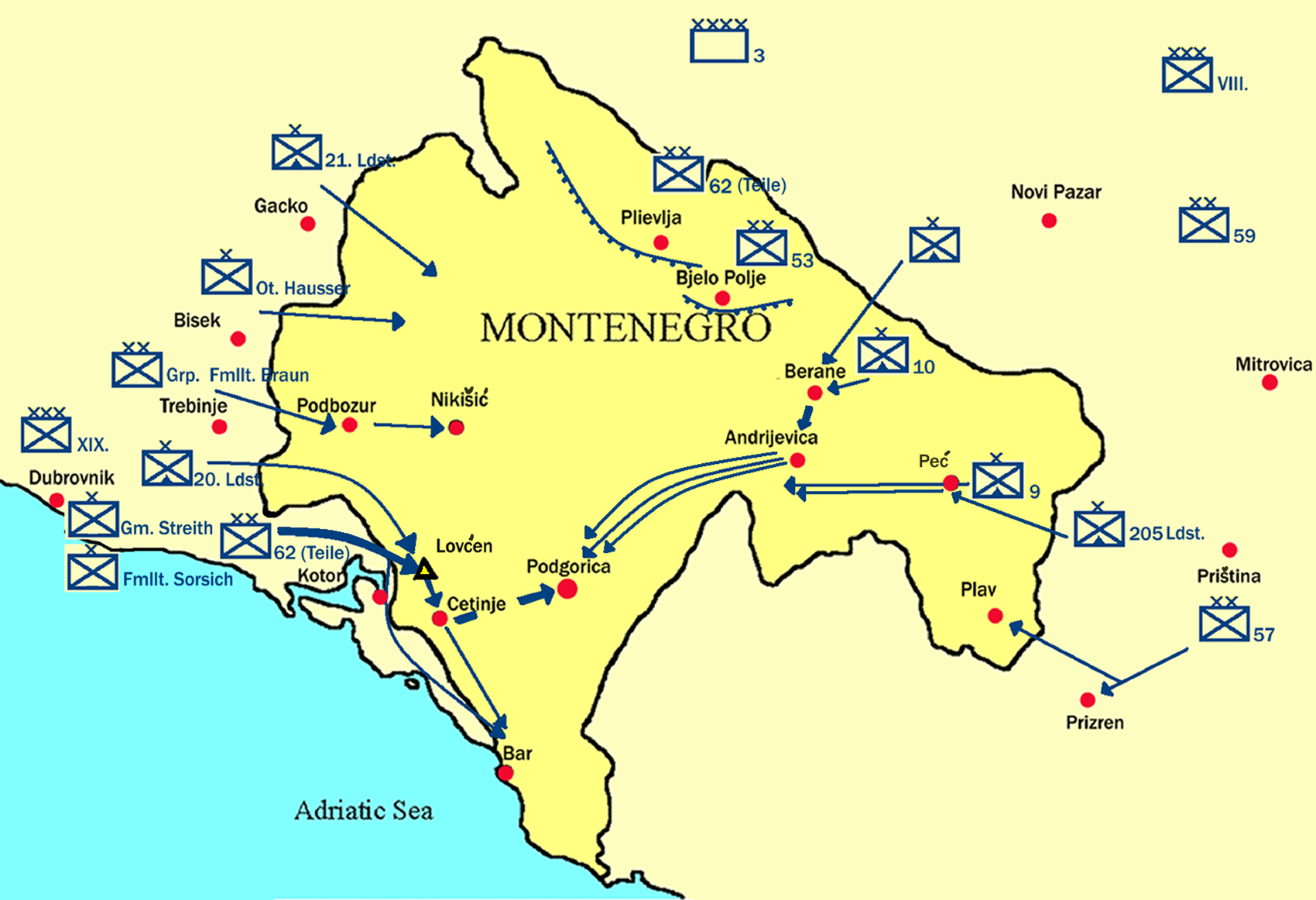
Date	5–17 January 1916
Location	Montenegro
Result	Austro-Hungarian victory

Belligerents
Austria-Hungary	Montenegro; Serbia; France

Commanders and leaders
(Austria-Hungary) H. K. von Kövessháza; (Austria-Hungary) Stjepan Sarkotić	(Kingdom of Montenegro) Nicholas I; (Kingdom of Montenegro) Janko Vukotić

The Montenegrin campaign in January 1916 was a part of the Serbian campaign during World War I, in which Austria-Hungary defeated and occupied the Kingdom of Montenegro, an ally of the Kingdom of Serbia.

By January 1916, the Serbian Army had been defeated by an Austrian-Hungarian, German and Bulgarian invasion. The remnants of the Serbian army had retreated through Montenegro and Albania, and were being evacuated by allied ships from 12 December first to Italy and later to Corfu.

The Austro-Hungarian High Command, then at Teschen, decided to use the success in Serbia to knock Montenegro out of the war. The Montenegrin Army that had fought alongside their Serbian allies, had now withdrawn into their own territory, but were still resisting against the Central Powers. Furthermore, the Austrian Commander-in-Chief Conrad von Hötzendorf wanted to take the Italian-held Albanian ports of Durazzo and Valona.

Two Austrian Army corps for this task were formed in December 1915. One in the west under command of Stjepan Sarkotić between Trebinje and Cattaro, composed of the XIX Armeekorps, reinforced with troops from Bosnia-Herzegovina and Dalmatia. They were to attack the main body of the Montenegrin army, gathered around Mount Lovćen, supported by French artillery, and a second attack was planned from Trebinje towards the east. In the east and north, the VIII Armeekorps under command of Hermann Kövess von Kövessháza was to attack the Montenegrin troops there.

== The Eastern Front ==
The VIII Armeekorps, which pursued the withdrawing Montenegrin army, had two tasks. On the one hand to slow down the Montenegrin troops; for this the 62nd and 53rd Infantry Divisions were used. On the other hand, it had to pass the Montenegrin right wing and converge with the XIX Korps on Podgorica.

The 62nd and 53rd Infantry Division entered Montenegro on 5 January 1916 from the North-East and advanced along Tara river towards Pljevlja and Bijelo Polje, where they were stopped by the Montenegrins in the Battle of Mojkovac. At the same time, the Austrian 10th and 18th Mountain brigades advanced from Novi Pazar and on 10 January took the city of Berane. The 205th and 9th Mountain brigades advanced westwards from Priština and took Peć and Velika. The 57th Infantry Division advanced from Prizren.

== The Western Front ==
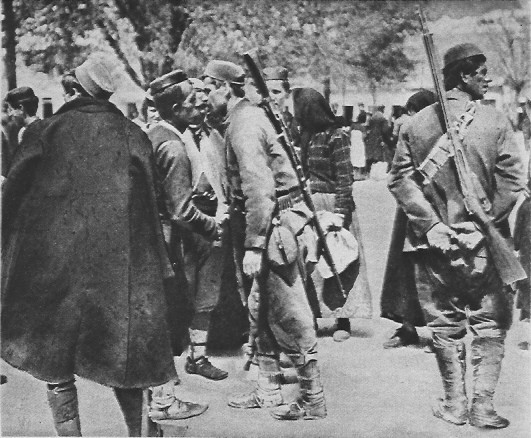
Montenegrin soldiers leaving for the Lovćen front

Mount Lovćen was the key defensive position of the Montenegrin army, who defended it as a citadel with roughly two-thirds of their forces. On 8 August 1914 the Montenegrin High Command commenced operations against the Austro-Hungarian naval base at Cattaro, the Austro-Hungarian Kriegsmarine's southernmost base in the Adriatic Sea. It was just across the border from Mount Lovćen where the Montenegrin army had placed several batteries of artillery, and on the same day, Montenegrin guns commenced firing on Austro-Hungarian fortifications at Cattaro which had been established by the Austro-Hungarian (Croatian) general Stjepan Sarkotić. The forts of Cattaro and the armoured cruiser SMS Kaiser Karl VI returned the fire, aided by reconnaissance from navy seaplanes. However, on 13 September, Austrian-Hungarian reinforcements arrived from Pola, in the form of three active pre-dreadnought coastal battleships, the SMS Monarch, SMS Wien, and SMS Budapest. They outgunned the Montenegrins, who nevertheless put up a fight for several weeks, with artillery duels almost daily.

With the entry of France into the war, the French realised that the capture of Cattaro might well be beneficial to their own navy and so they landed an artillery detachment of four 15 cm and four 12 cm naval guns under the command of Capitaine de frégate Grellier, at Antivari, on 18–19 September. It took Grellier a month to move his guns inland but eventually his batteries were set up and positioned in fortifications on the south side of Mount Lovćen. On 19 October the French guns opened fire on the Austro-Hungarian positions. The Austro-Hungarians called for reinforcements and on 21 October Admiral Anton Haus despatched the modern semi-dreadnought battleship SMS Radetzky. With a broadside of four 30.5 cm guns and four 24 cm guns, the Radetzky would tip the balance of the battle in the favour of the Austro-Hungarians. Naval seaplanes had been busy taking photographs and mapping accurate positions, and at 16:27, on 22 October all of the battleships opened fire on these position. Radetzky made a number of direct hits on the guns and fortified positions on the mountain and on 24 October one of the French 12 cm guns was completely knocked out. On 26 October the Radetzky opened fire before sunrise, catching the French and Montenegrins off guard, and a number of batteries and fortifications were destroyed during what was a heavy bombardment, including another French 12 cm gun.

By 10:00, Allied firing from Mount Lovćen had ceased. The following day the Radetzky repositioned closer to the shore and blasted the Allied positions further. Grellier conceded defeat and pulled out his remaining saveable guns. Likewise, the Montenegrins abandoned their fortifications. By November, the French High Command decided to give up its campaign to neutralize and capture Cattaro, and the Radetzky returned to Pola on 16 December.

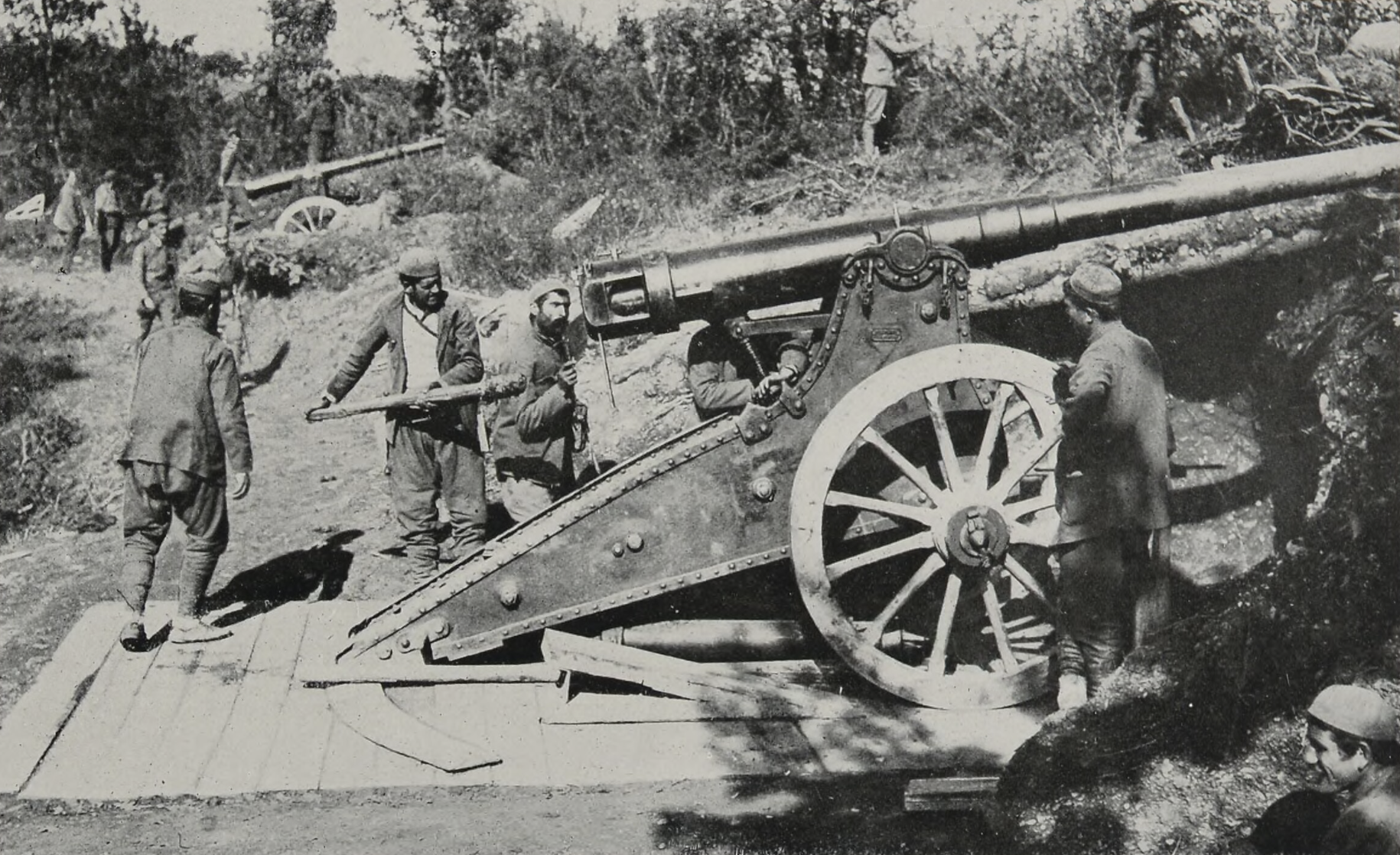
Montenegrin heavy artillery defends the Lovćen position

On 8 January 1916 a new attack against Montenegrin forces on Mt. Lovćen began with a massive artillery bombardment followed by an Austro-Hungarian army offensive into Montenegro. The Austrian's coastal battleship Budapest was again used to assist the troops against Lovćen's renewed defences to such good effect that on the 10th, the Austro-Hungarian troops took the Lovćen Pass and the adjacent heights, where the French guns had previously been. The two heavy bombardments of Mount Lovćen played a decisive role in breaking the morale of the defenders of the mountain, and by 11 January, Mount Lovćen was in Austrian hands.

In the meantime, two independent brigades under Feldmarschalleutnant Braun advanced towards Nikšić, covering the left flank and threatening to cut off the Montenegrins from the north-east. Braun, however, encountered stiff resistance and advanced only 10 km in the direction of Nikšić.

On 13 January 1916, the vanguard of the Austrian army reached the Montenegrin capital Cetinje.

== Armistice ==
Negotiations for an armistice started on 13 January, after the fall of Cetinje. When told of the terms, King Nicholas I of Montenegro at first refused to sign the Armistice and left for Albania and from there travelled to Italy on 19 January. From there he issued an order to Janko Vukotić demanding that the army continue to fight and eventually retreat with the Serbians to Albania and Corfu but instead the government ministers who had remained in Montenegro issued a proclamation to the Montenegrin armed forces to surrender all weapons and signed the armistice, withdrawing Montenegro from the war.

On 1 March a provisional military government was established under Viktor Weber Edler von Webenau, he was replaced by Heinrich Clam-Martinic on 10 July 1917, who filled this position until the end of the war.

During the following weeks the troops of the 3rd Austro-Hungarian Army occupied the rest of Montenegro and invaded Albania, taking Scutari and finally Durazzo at the end of February. (The evacuation of the Serbian army had been completed by 10 February.)

=== Rewards ===
General Stjepan Sarkotić was made a Hungarian baron and officially styled Stefan Baron Sarkotić von Lovćen. Major General Ignaz Trollmann, commander of the XIX Corps, was ennobled as baron in 1917 with the style of Freiherr Trollmann von Lovcenberg. General Kövess was awarded the Silver Merit Medal (Signum Laudis) with war-ribbon on 12 January 1916 and promoted to Generaloberst on 26 February 1916.

== See also ==
- Austro-Hungarian occupation of Montenegro

== Bibliography ==
- DiNardo, Richard L. (2015). Invasion: The Conquest of Serbia, 1915. Santa Barbara: Praeger. ISBN 9781440800924.
- Theodor Konopicky: Der österreichisch-ungarische Krieg, Leipzig: Barth 1922.
- Srdja Pavlovic: Balkan Anschluss: The Annexation of Montenegro and the Creation of the Common South Slavic State, West Lafayette (Indiana): Purdue University Press 2008, pp. 75–86.
- Hermann Baron Kövess von Kövessháza
