= Ovče Pole Offensive =

Bulgarian operation during the Serbian campaign of 1915

Ovche Pole Offensive
- Part of Serbian Campaign (World War I)
Date	14 October 1915 – 15 November 1915
Location	between Vranje and Berovo, then in Serbia
Result	Bulgarian victory

Belligerents
Bulgaria	Serbia

Commanders and leaders
(Tsardom of Bulgaria (1908–1946)) Georgi Todorov	(Kingdom of Serbia) Damjan Popović

Strength
2nd Army: 100,247 men; 53,325 rifles; 52 machine guns; 182 cannons	2 – 3 divisions: 41,250 rifles; 33 machine guns; 78 cannons

Casualties and losses
Heavy	Heavy

The Ovche Pole Offensive Operation (Bulgarian: Овчеполска настъпателна операция, Serbian: Битка на Овчем Пољу) was an operation of the Bulgarian Army that occurred between 14 October 1915 and 15 November 1915 as part of the Serbian campaign of 1915 in World War I. It aimed to seize the Vardar river valley and to cut the vital railway linking Skopje with Thessaloniki to prevent the Serbian Army from being resupplied and reinforced by the Franco-British Allied forces. The Bulgarian forces consisted of the Second Army (3rd Balkan Infantry Division, 7th Rila Division and the Cavalry Division with 182 guns) under the command of Lieutenant General Georgi Todorov.

The main blow was at Kumanovo, where the Bulgarian 3rd and 7th divisions easily defeated the outnumbered Serbian Army. On the third day, the Bulgarian Cavalry Division also advanced, defeating the Serbian counter-attack and reaching Veles and the Vardar. With this success, the aim was achieved. While fighting against the Serbs, the Bulgarians defeated two French divisions in the Battle of Krivolak and conclusively cut the way between the Serbs and the Allies, resulting in the fall of Serbia after the Kosovo Offensive Operation in 1915.

== Sources ==
- DiNardo, Richard L. (2015). Invasion: The Conquest of Serbia, 1915. Santa Barbara: Praeger. ISBN 9781440800924.
- "Българската армия в Световната война 1915-1918",Том III;Държавна печатница София 1938.

== Notes ==
- The number includes the Serbian forces in Macedonia at the Albanian border on 13 October 1915 - 11,650 rifles,24 cannons and 12 machine guns.
