= Serbian campaign (1915) =

1915 military campaign in Serbia

- Part of the Serbian campaign of World War I
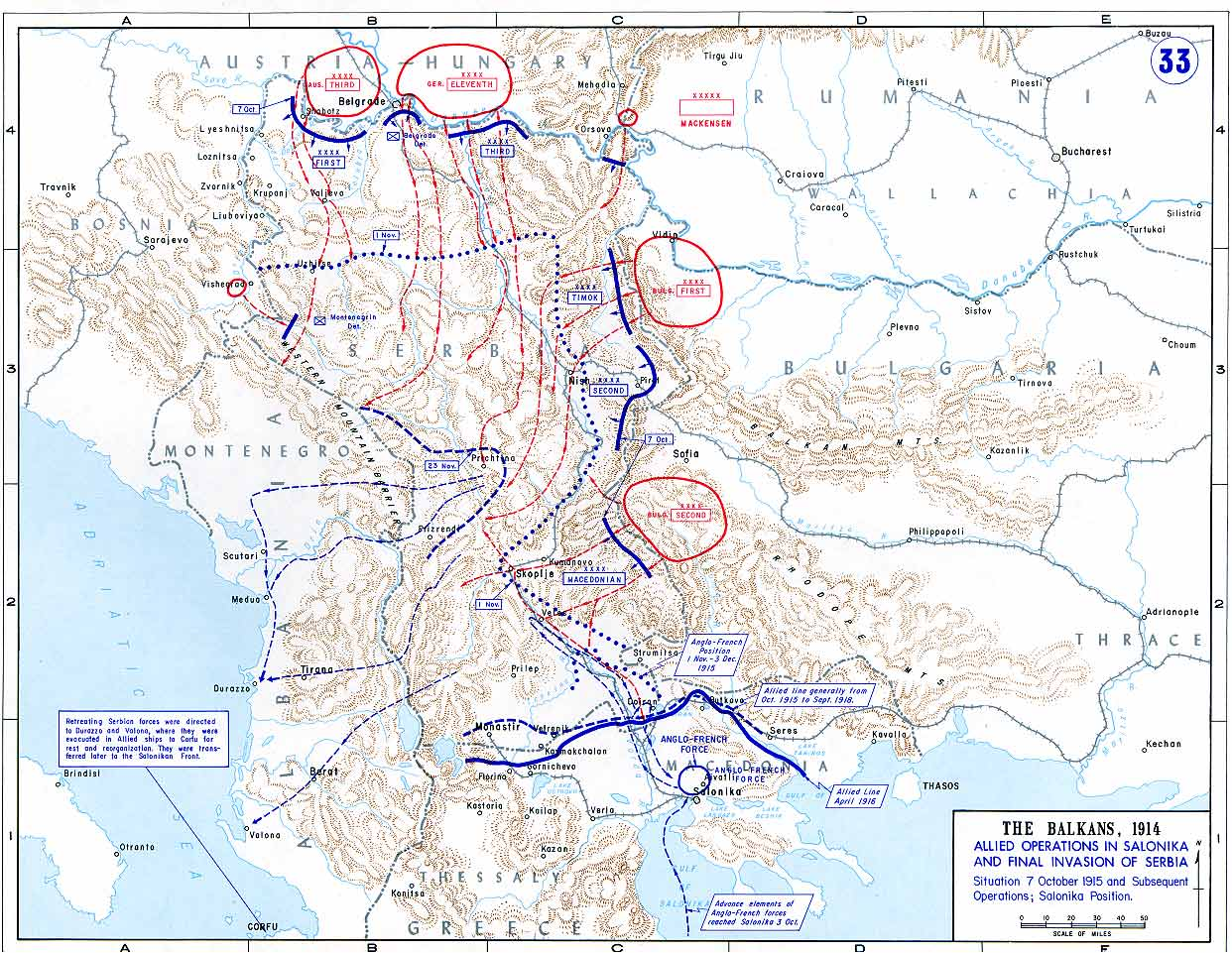
- Map showing the timeline of the Campaign
Date	7 October 1915 – 24 November 1915 (1 month, 2 weeks and 3 days)
Location	Serbia, Montenegro, Albania
Result	Central Powers victory; Serbian retreat through Albania
Territorial changes	Austro-Hungarian & Bulgarian occupation of Serbia

Belligerents
Germany; Austria-Hungary; Bulgaria	Serbia; Montenegro Supported By: Italy France

Commanders and leaders
(German Empire) August von Mackensen; (German Empire) Max von Gallwitz; (Austria-Hungary) Hermann Kövess; (Tsardom of Bulgaria (1908–1946)) Kliment Boyadzhiev; (Tsardom of Bulgaria (1908–1946)) Georgi Todorov	(Kingdom of Serbia) Radomir Putnik; (Kingdom of Serbia) Živojin Mišić; (Kingdom of Serbia) Stepa Stepanović; (Kingdom of Serbia) Pavle Šturm; (Kingdom of Montenegro) Janko Vukotić

Units involved
Army Group Mackensen (German Empire) 11th Army (Austria-Hungary) 3rd Army (Tsardom of Bulgaria (1908–1946)) 1st Army (Tsardom of Bulgaria (1908–1946)) 2nd Army	Royal Serbian Army (Kingdom of Serbia) 1st Army (Kingdom of Serbia) 2nd Army (Kingdom of Serbia) 3rd Army

Strength
Total: 600,000; 100,000 Germans 200,000 Austro-Hungarians 566 battalions and 273 guns (108 heavy); 300,000 Bulgarians	Total: ~300,000; ~260,000 Serbians; 275 battalions and 654 cannons 48,300 Montenegrins; 45 Italian transport vessels 25 French transport vessels

Casualties and losses
Total: 67,000; 12,000+ Germans; 18,000 Austro-Hungarians; 37,000 Bulgarians	218,000 Serbians; 94,000 killed or wounded; 174,000 captured, of which 50,000 wounded; 23,325 Montenegrins (Note: Number is for total Montenegrin losses in the war, including the Macedonian front.); 13,325 killed/missing; ~10,000 wounded

The Serbian campaign of 1915 (German: Der serbische Feldzug 1915) refers to a military campaign carried out by the Central Powers, primarily Germany, Austria-Hungary and Bulgaria, against the Kingdom of Serbia during World War I. The campaign took place from October to November 1915.

After Serbia successfully resisted Austria-Hungary's advances during the Serbian campaign of 1914, the Central Powers launched a joint offensive against Serbia with a combined force of over 600,000 soldiers. They enjoyed numerical and technological superiority over the Serbian army, which was heavily outnumbered and lacked adequate supplies and equipment.

The campaign began with a series of coordinated offensives aimed at breaking through Serbian defensive lines. The Serbian army, led by King Peter I and Field Marshal Radomir Putnik, fought valiantly but was ultimately overwhelmed by the Central Powers' forces, with German and Austro-Hungarian forces attacking from the north while Bulgarian troops attacked from the east. The Serbian army, along with a significant number of civilians, embarked on a retreat across the Albanian mountains, suffering heavy casualties from combat, disease, and harsh weather, the retreat became known as the Great Retreat or the "Albanian Golgotha."

By the end of the Serbian campaign of 1915, the Central Powers had effectively eliminated Serbia as a threat, secured their position in the region and opened up a land route to provide supplies to the embattled Ottoman Empire. Serbia was then divided between the Austro-Hungarian occupied zone and the Bulgarian occupied zone. The Serbian government, along with the remnants of its army, evacuated to the Greek island of Corfu, where they regrouped and later played a crucial role in the ultimate Allied victory in the war.

== Background ==
Regarding the Kingdom of Serbia as a threat to their territorial integrity and the stability of their multi-ethnic empire, Austria-Hungary declared war on Serbia on 28 July 1914, following the assassination of Archduke Franz Ferdinand by a Bosnian-Serb nationalist. This triggered a series of alliances and escalations among European powers, ultimately leading to the outbreak of World War I.

In August 1914, Austria-Hungary launched an invasion of Serbia. Against all odds, the Serbian army, led by General Radomir Putnik managed to repel multiple offensives from a much larger and better-equipped enemy. The Serbian campaign of 1914 ended late on 14 December with a victory for Serbia. The Austro-Hungarians suffered heavy casualties with over 224,000 dead, wounded or prisoner and were unable to achieve their objectives but the victory also brought heavy losses to the Serbian army with 170,000 casualties a much higher percentage for the small kingdom, making further offensive operations impossible.

== Prelude ==
In early 1915, following Ottoman defeats at the Battle of Sarikamish and during the First Suez Offensive, German Chief of the General Staff Erich von Falkenhayn attempted to persuade Austro-Hungarian Chief of Staff Conrad von Hötzendorf about the strategic importance of capturing Serbia. The rationale behind this proposition was to establish a direct rail connection from Germany through Austria-Hungary, ultimately reaching Istanbul and beyond. This proposed rail link would facilitate the transportation of military resources, and potentially troops, to support the Ottoman Empire.

Russia posed a significant threat as an adversary, and the entry of Italy into the war on the side of the Allies further complicated the challenges faced by the Austro-Hungarian forces. On 8 September 1915, Erich von Falkenhayn and Franz Conrad von Hötzendorf signed a military convention in Pless. The conference called for an immediate attack on Serbia.

Both the Allies and the Central Powers attempted to persuade Bulgaria to align with their respective sides. Bulgaria and Serbia had a history of conflict, having engaged in two wars in the previous three decades: the Serbo-Bulgarian War in 1885 and the Second Balkan War in 1913. By aligning with the Central Powers, Bulgaria was promised not only disputed lands from Serbia but also additional territories in Macedonia and Thrace; in addition Germany and Austria-Hungary, offered Bulgaria military and economic support. Following the Allied defeat in the Gallipoli campaign and the Russian setback at Gorlice, Tsar Ferdinand of Bulgaria signed a treaty with Germany and on 23 September 1915 started mobilisation for war. During the preceding nine months, the Serbs had tried and failed to rebuild their battered armies and improve their supply situation.

== Opposing forces ==
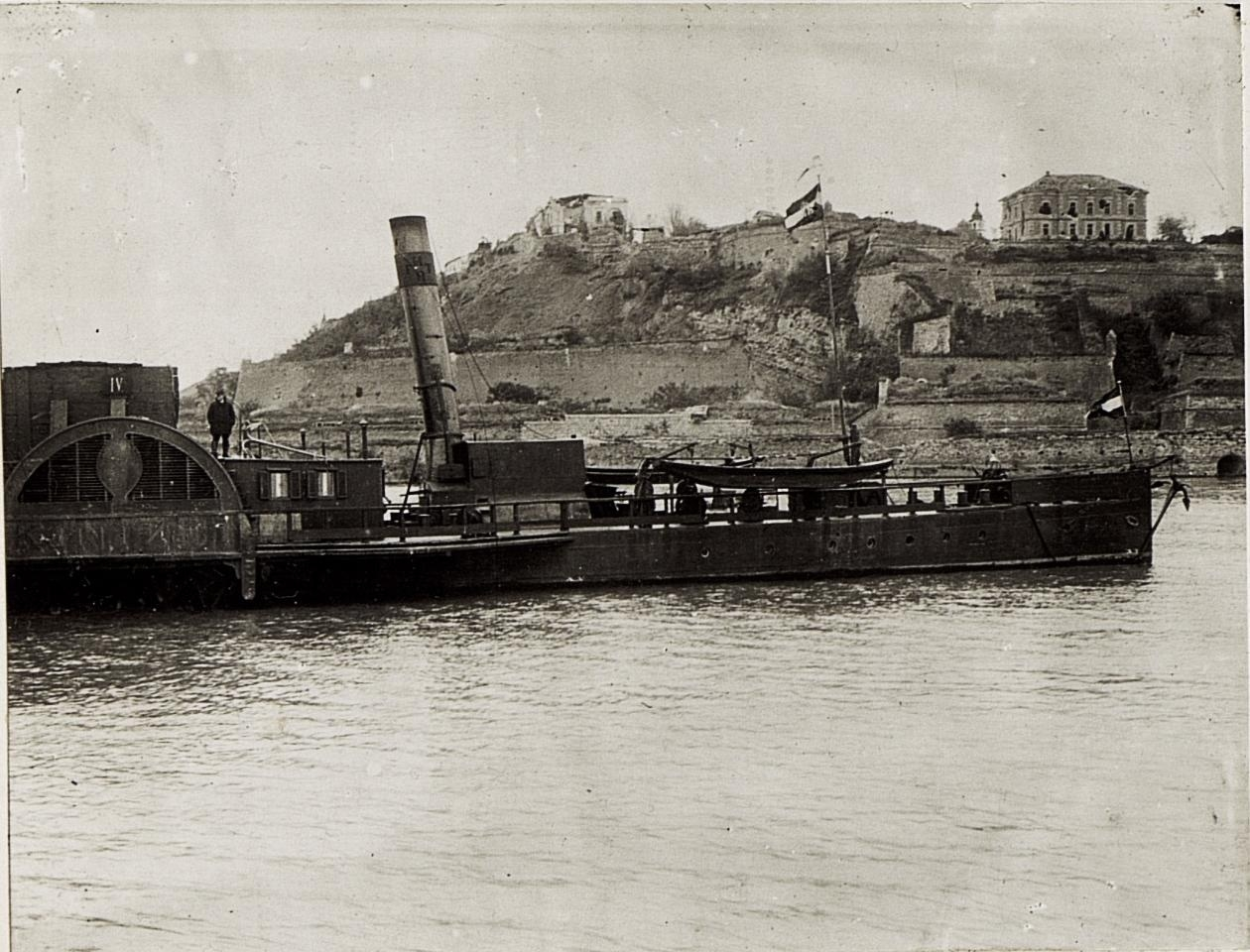
Austro-Hungarian river boat on the Danube and Sava with Kalemegdan fortress during Austrian attack in 1915

Despite their efforts, the Serbian army was only about 30,000 men stronger than at the start of the war (around 225,000) and was still poorly equipped. The first Serbian Campaign had taken the lives of 100,000 soldiers and had been followed by an epidemic of typhus caused by the sick and wounded left behind by the Austro-Hungarians. The disease claimed the lives of another 135,000 Serbs.

The Serbian army was commanded by Voivode Radomir Putnik who had defeated the Austro-Hungarians in 1914, Putnik's main commanders were Voivode Živojin Mišić leading the Serbian First Army, Voivode Stepa Stepanović commander of the Second Army while the Serbian Third Army was under Pavle Jurišić Šturm. The Serbian army had about 780 guns, most of them heavy, the Serbians were forced to spread their forces by the entry of Bulgaria on the side of the Central powers. The commander (Serdar) of the Montenegrin forces was Janko Vukotić.

Against Serbia were the German Eleventh Army led by Generaloberst Max von Gallwitz, the Austro-Hungarian Third Army commanded by General der Infanterie Hermann Kövess and the Bulgarian First Army under Generalleutnant Kliment Boyadzhiev (comprising the Sixth, Eighth, Ninth and First Divisions); all under the supreme command of Field Marshal August von Mackensen. In addition, the Bulgarian Second Army commanded by Georgi Todorov (comprising the Third and Seventh Divisions, a cavalry division and a group of volunteers), which remained under the direct control of the Bulgarian high command, was deployed in Macedonia to block any advance by the entente forces from Salonika.

== Operations ==
=== River crossings and capture of Belgrade ===
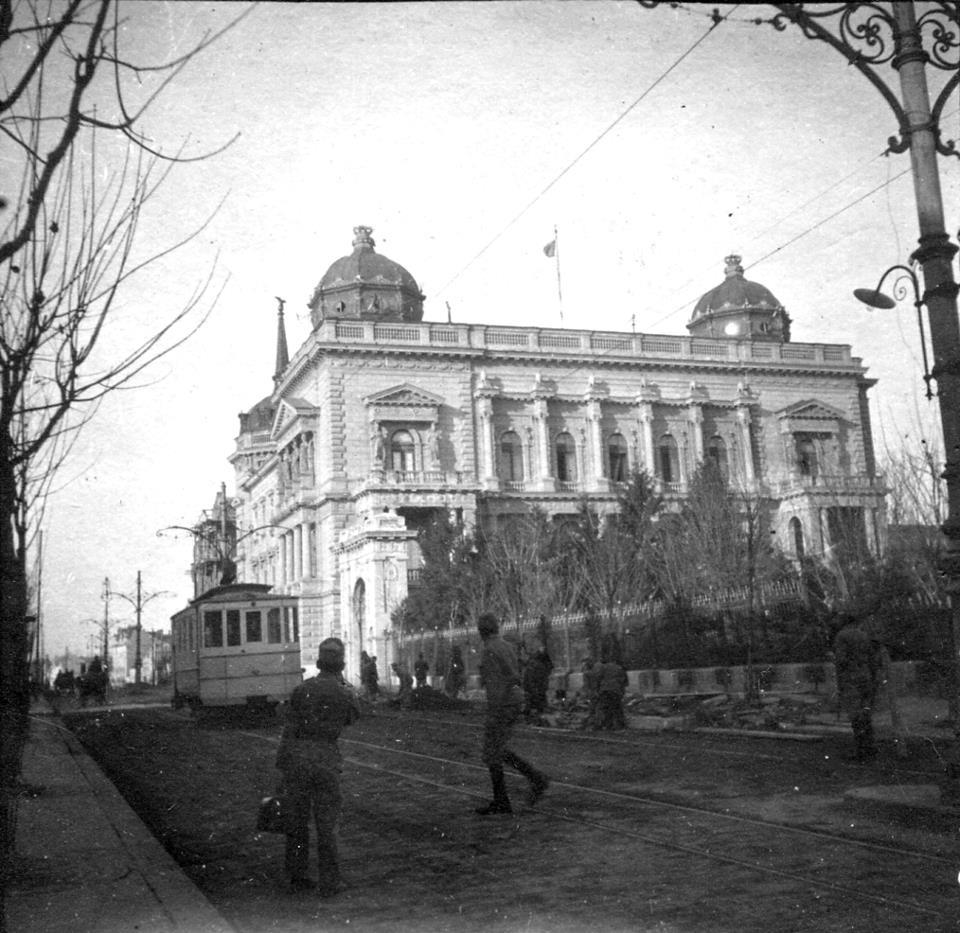
Austro-Hungarian troops capture Belgrade on 9 October 1915.

On 5 October after extensive aerial reconnaissance, Austro-Hungarian artillery began to fire on Serbian guns and known defensive positions. On 6 October, the offensive was launched when German Eleventh Army (GE Eleventh Army) and Austro-Hungarian Third Army (AH Third Army), some 300,000 men strong, started advancing towards the Danube and the Drina and Sava rivers. That day Bulgarian troops started sporadic attacks across various border crossing with Serbia. Early on 7 October crossing of the Sava by Austro-Hungarian Third Army, including the German XXII Reserve Corps, began supported by monitors from the Imperial and Royal Danube Flotilla.

Having sent the Timok Group and the Second Army to defend the Bulgarian border, Putnik could only oppose four divisions to the Austro-Hungarian and German invading forces. On 8 October German troops managed to reach the south bank of the Sava, threatening the Serbian west flank and the north of Belgrade. That same day Austro-Hungarian troops entered Belgrade, hard hand-to-hand fighting ensued. Facing overwhelming artillery superiority, Serbian forces were forced back; during the night of 8–9 October General Mihailo Živković gave up the capital, pulling the Defence of Belgrade Group out to position south where it joined with the 2nd Timok Division.

On 9 October Belgrade was occupied by Austro-Hungarian Third Army while German Eleventh Army had crossed the Danube with the III Corps at Smederevo and with the X Corps at Ram, successfully establishing two bridgeheads to serve as base for further operations.

=== Bulgaria joins the invasion ===
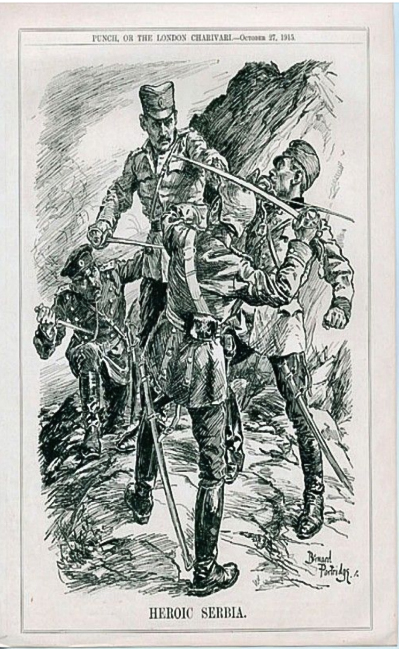
Punch view of Bulgaria stabbing Serbia in the back whilst the country is being invaded by Germany and Austria-Hungary

On 11 October, having mobilised but without a declaration of war, Bulgaria started border attacks into Serbia. On 14 October, Bulgaria officially declared war; General Kliment Boyadzhiev's Bulgarian First Army, under German orders, was to advance on Niš, the temporary capital of the Serbian government and link with German Eleventh Army; the Bulgarian Second Army under General Georgi Todorov was to proceed into Macedonia, to sever the rail line between Niš and Salonika and thus prevent Allied relief forces and ammunitions from reaching the Serbs.

The Bulgarian First Army first made quick progress as the Serbs had moved troops north and the border units were of "low quality" but was stopped by the Serbian Second Army which made the German general staff request reinforcements, resulting in the German Alpine Corps brought in from the French front, as well as the Austro-Hungarian 10th Mountain Brigade. In the south, the Bulgarian Second Army could not be stopped and managed to sever the train line on 16 October then reach the Vardar River on 19, Kumanovo on 20, Skopje on 22 and capturing the strategic Kačanik gorge on 26 October forcing the Serbians to retreat again. As a result, Serbian General Damjan Popović, commander of the New Territories, was replaced by Petar Bojović. On 25 October units of First Army captured Negotin and connected with German Eleventh Army. Facing encirclement from German and Austro- Hungarian troops only 6 miles from Kragujevac and Bulgarians 15 miles to the east near Niš, the Serbs only hope was to fight its way south to link up with Allies forces.

=== Allies breakthrough attempts ===
After Greece chose to remain neutral, despite the terms of the treaty of alliance with Serbia, the Allies agreed to send a force to support the Serbs. After much delays imposed by Greece, the French 156th Division and the British 10th Division arrived in Salonika from Gallipoli early October. Under the command of French General Maurice Sarrail, two French divisions marched north towards Serbia, with the goal was of liberating Skopje, occupied by the Bulgarians.

The French government and the War Office in London were both hesitant to advance too deep into Serbia, but Sarrail continued up the Vardar. This advance provided some limited assistance to the retreating Serbian army, as the Bulgarians had to concentrate larger forces on their southern flank to deal with the threat, which led to the Battle of Krivolak. The French and British soldiers, moving up in two columns on both sides of the Vardar River into Serbian Macedonia, comprised a total force of 60,000 men. They were stopped and forced to retreat after clashing with the leading elements of the Bulgarian Second Army.

In a similar fashion, on December 7, at the Battle of Kosturino, the Second Army attacked the British 10th (Irish) Infantry Division, veterans of the Gallipoli campaign in poor physical condition, forcing it to retreat into Salonika by 12 December.The German High Command refused Bulgarian demands to advance into Greece.

=== Kragujevac ===
On October 31, 1915, Mackensen launched an attack intended to decisively defeat the Serbian Army at Kragujevac via encirclement. Facing the oncoming German III Corps, Austro-Hungarian units to the west, and the Bulgarian 9th Infantry Division blocking the southern route through Niš, the Serbian army abandoned Kragujevac without a fight. They retreated into the mountains followed by large groups of civilians, escaping the trap, and leaving only rearguards to slow down the oncoming enemies. On 5 November, the Bulgarian 9th Infantry Division successfully established contact with the German Eleventh Army. On November 6, the Forty-Third Reserve Infantry Division secured the area south of Kraljevo. This allowed the Central Powers access to the Ibar River valley.

=== Final offensive ===
Field Marshal Mackensen ordered a pursuit by the Bulgarians southwest toward Pristina, however, the First Army encountered challenges in crossing the West and South Morava Rivers. On 10 November the Bulgarian First Division managed to cross the South Morava at Leskovac, but a Serbian force consisting of the Timok I, Šumadija II, and Morava II Divisions launched a surprise counterattack driving the Bulgarians back. The Serbians continued their retreat toward Pristina while enemy aerial reconnaissance followed their movements.

The Germans pursued the Serbian forces with the X Reserve Corps, including the 107th Infantry Division, which had to navigate difficult terrain and mountain passes, on 13 November they were able to secure the passes against the Serbian Drina II Division. As the Central Powers advanced, the Serbian army managed to maintain its organisational integrity and hold off their pursuers despite the loss of key cities. The Serbian forces reached Pristina and Kosovo ahead of their pursuers and chose to continue retreating towards Prizren, escaping the enemy's attempts to encircle them. On 20 November, Nikola Pašić sent a message asking the Allies for supplies to be sent to Adriatic ports. On 23 November Mitrovica and Pristina fell to the Central Powers.

== Serbian retreat across the mountains ==
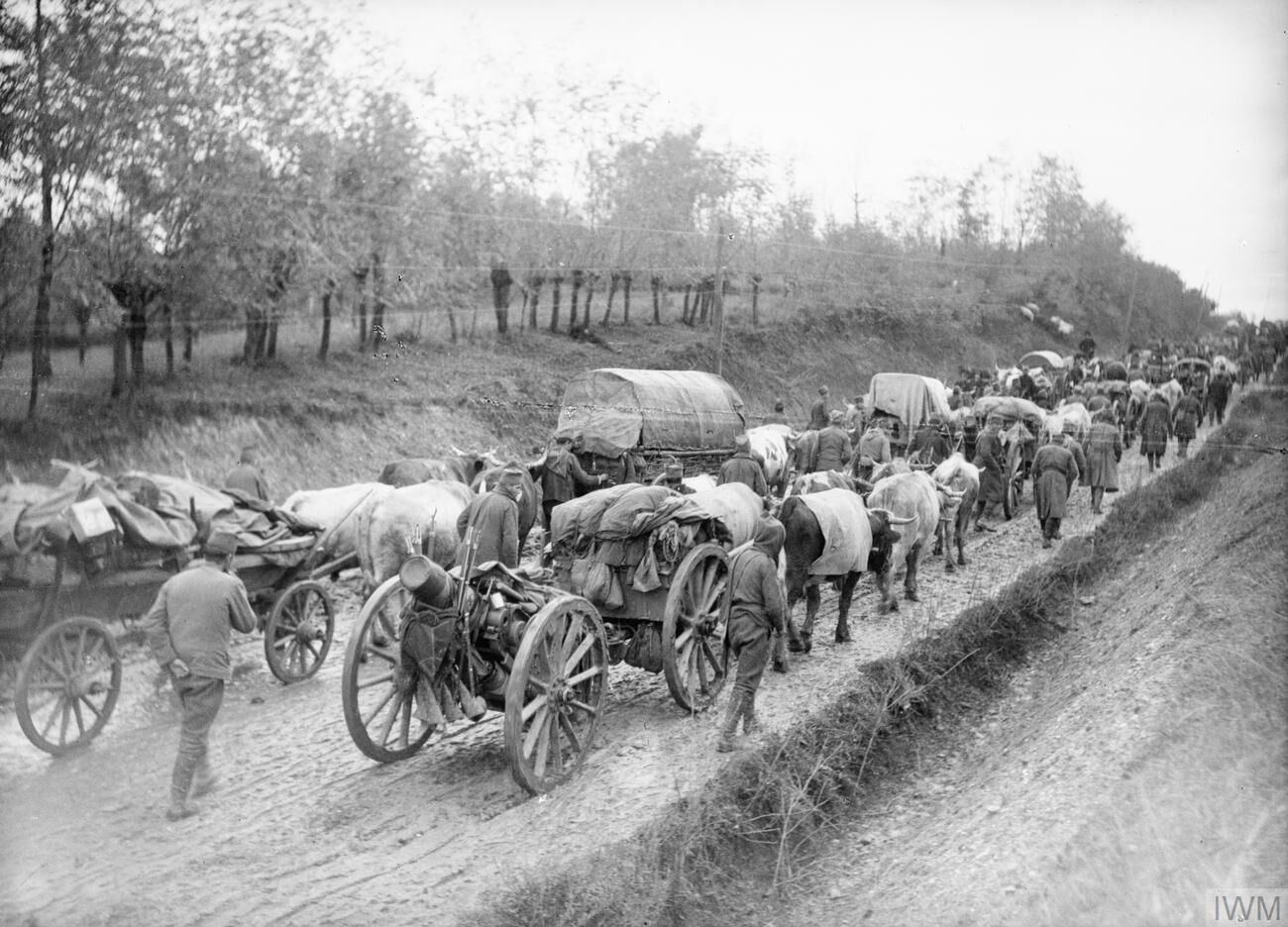
A column of the Serbian Army during its retreat towards the Adriatic coast.

To escape the encirclement by the Central Powers, on 25 November 1915, the government and the supreme command made the decision to withdraw across the Accursed Mountains of Montenegro and Albania. The objective was to reach the Adriatic coast, where the Serbs could regroup and replenish. The retreat involved the remaining army forces, the King, hundreds of thousands of civilian refugees, and war prisoners. It was a perilous journey undertaken in the midst of winter, with severe weather conditions, difficult roads, and the constant threat of attacks by enemy forces and Albanian tribal bands.

Between November 1915 and January 1916, during the trek across the mountains 77,455 soldiers and 160,000 civilians succumbed to freezing temperatures, starvation, diseases, or enemy actions. Austrian pilots employed new aerial bombardment technology, dropping bombs on the retreating columns, marking what has been described as 'the first aerial bombardment of civilians.'

Out of the initial 400,000 people who began this journey, only 120,000 soldiers and 60,000 civilians managed to reach the Adriatic coast. They then boarded Allied transport ships that took them to the island of Corfu, before eventually being sent to Salonika. The evacuation of the Serbian army was completed on 5 April 1916. Some survivors were in such weakened conditions that thousands of them died in the weeks following their rescue. Marshal Putnik, who had to be carried throughout the entire retreat, died fifteen months later in France. The period known as the "Great Retreat", also known as the Albanian Golgotha, is regarded in Serbian history as one of the nation's greatest tragedies.

== Aftermath ==
The Army of Montenegro did not follow the Serbs into exile but retreated to defend their own country. The Austrian-Hungarians launched their Montenegrin campaign on 5 January 1916. Despite some success of The Montenegrins in the Battle of Mojkovac, they were defeated within two weeks.

=== Occupation of Serbia ===
Serbia was divided by the Central Powers, between separate Austro-Hungarian and Bulgarian military occupation zones. In the northern and central part of Serbia, which fell under Austro-Hungarian control, a Military General Governorate of Serbia was established, headquartered in Belgrade. The Bulgarian-occupied territory saw the formation of a military government with its center in Niš, with the area further divided into two administrative zones. Both the Austro-Hungarian and Bulgarian occupation administrations implemented stringent measures, subjecting the population to various forms of repression, including mass internment, forced labor, concentration camps for political opponents, famine, denationalisation, and policies aimed at cultural assimilation. Kosovo was divided into two Austro-Hungarian occupational zones and the Bulgarian Military Region of Macedonia.

=== Macedonian Front ===
In 1916, over 110,000 Serbian troops were relocated to Salonika, where they subsequently joined the Allied forces following Greece's entry into the war. These Serbian units would ultimately play a pivotal role in the breakthrough of the Macedonian Front in September 1917 and the subsequent liberation of Serbia a year later when French and Serbian forces defeated Bulgarian and German forces at the Battle of Dobro Pole.
