= Viktor Weber Edler von Webenau =

Austrian military officer (1861–1932)

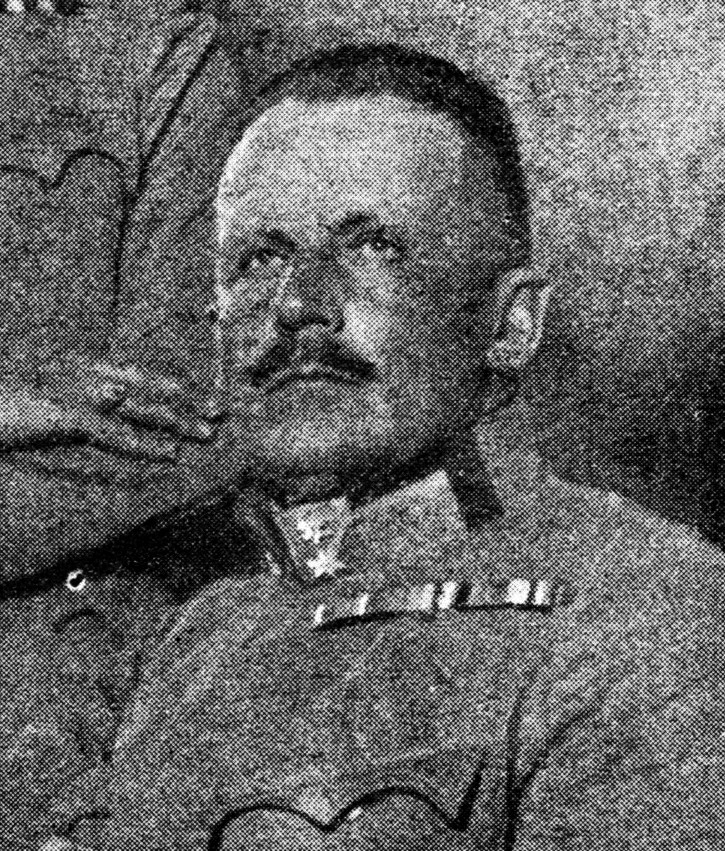
- Viktor Weber Edler von Webenau 1916
- Born: 13 November 1861; Neuhaus, Austrian Empire
- Died: 6 May 1932 (aged 70); Innsbruck, Austria
- Military career
- Allegiance: Austro-Hungarian Empire
- Branch: Austro-Hungarian Army
- Service years: 1879-1918
- Rank: General der Infanterie

2nd Governor-General of the Military General Government of Montenegro
- In office 26 February 1916 – 10 July 1917
- Monarchs: Franz Joseph I Charles I
- Minister-President of Austria: Karl von Stürgkh; Ernest von Koerber; Heinrich Clam-Martinic; Ernst Seidler von Feuchtenegg
- Reich Minister of War: Alexander von Krobatin; Rudolf Stöger-Steiner von Steinstätten
- Chief of the General Staff: Franz Conrad von Hötzendorf; Arthur Arz von Straußenburg
- Preceded by: Hermann Kövess von Kövessháza
- Succeeded by: Heinrich Clam-Martinic

Viktor Weber Edler von Webenau (13 November 1861 – 6 May 1932) was an Austrian military officer who served as General in the Austro-Hungarian Army during World War I, military governor of Montenegro between 1916 and 1917 and head of the Austro-Hungarian armistice commission for the Armistice of Villa Giusti.

== Career ==
- 1879: as Kadett-Offizierstellvertreter from Infanteriekadettenschule Liebenau to Feldjägerbataillon 27
- 1 November 1880: Lieutenant, General staff branch
- 1 May 1911: Major General and commander 4th Mountain Brigade
- 25 April 1914: Supreme Military Court
- 1 July 1914: Vice-President of SMC
- 1 August 1914: Feldmarschalleutnant
- 9 April 1915: Commander 47. Infanterie Division
- 26 February 1916: Military Governor of Montenegro
- 10 July 1917: Commander X. Corps
- 1 November 1917: General der Infanterie
- 7 February 1918: Commander of all mobile troops in the districts of Vienna, Kraków, Lemberg
- 15 May 1918: Commander XVIII. Corps
- July 1918: Commander VI. Corps
- 27 October - 3 November 1918: Chief of the "Waffenstillstandskommission" with Italy

== Family ==
Viktor Weber Edler von Webenau was married two times:

- 1886–1900: Therese, née Baumgartner
- 1901–1932: Anna, née Hebenstreit

=== Children ===
- Guido Weber-Webenau (Dr. phil.), (* 13 September 1887 in Tarvis; † ?)
- Norbert Weber von Webenau, (* 7 July 1886 in Tarvis; † 26 August 1914 killed in action in Galicia)

== Decorations (selection) ==
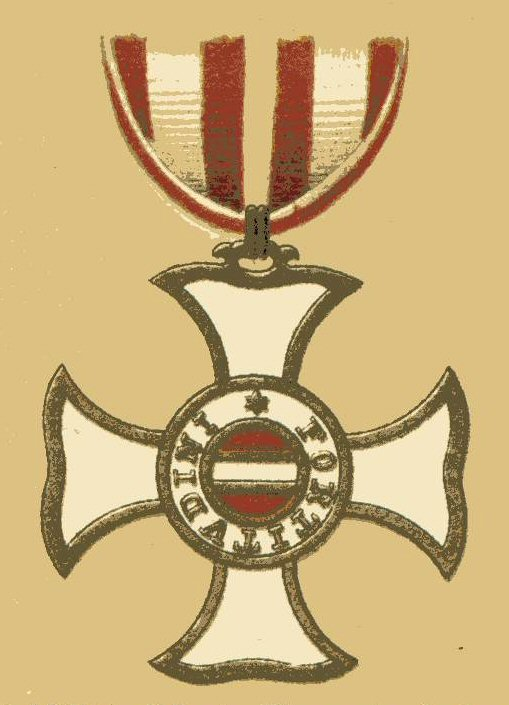
Military Order of Maria Theresa

- Knight's Cross of the Military Maria Theresia Order
- Grand Cross of the Franz Joseph Order with War Decoration
- Military Merit Cross 2nd Class with War Decoration and Swords
- Order of the Iron Crown 2nd Class with War Decoration and Swords
- Officer's Cross of the Franz Joseph Order
- Honour Insignia 1st Class of the Austrian Red Cross
- Military Merit Cross 3rd Class
- Bronze Military Merit Medal with War Decoration (Signum Laudis)
- Service Badge for Officers 2nd Class
- Military Jubilee Medal 1898
- Military Jubilee Cross 1908
- Mobilization Cross of 1912/13
- Prussian Iron Cross 1st and 2nd Class
- Ottoman Iron Crescent

He was additionally appointed a Geheimer Rat (Privy Councillor) of Austria-Hungary.

== Rank ==
- 1 November 1880: Leutnant
- 1 May 1886: Oberleutnant
- 1 October 1893: Hauptmann 2. Klasse
- 1 November 1895: Hauptmann 1. Klasse
- 1 November 1898: Major
- 1 May 1902: Oberstleutnant
- 1 May 1905: Oberst
- 2 May 1911: Generalmajor
- 8 August 1914: Feldmarschalleutnant
- 17 November 1917: General der Infanterie
