= Heinrich Clam-Martinic =

Count Heinrich Clam-Martinic
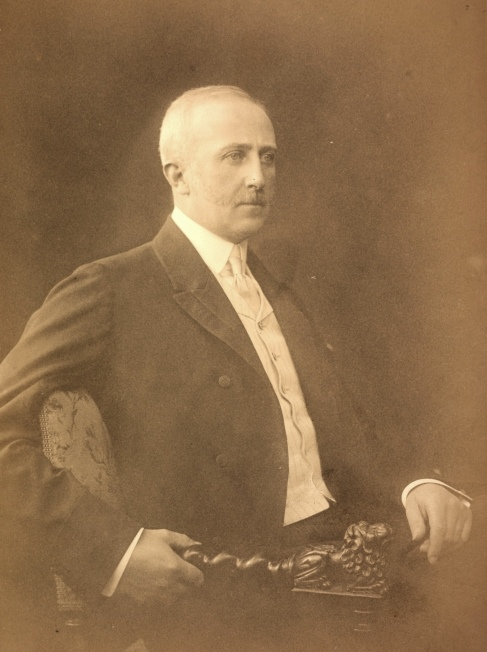
- Minister-president Clam-Martinic

24th Minister-President of Cisleithania
- In office 20 December 1916 – 23 June 1917
- Monarch: Charles I
- Preceded by: Ernest von Koerber
- Succeeded by: Ernst Seidler von Feuchtenegg

3rd Governor-General of the Military General Government of Montenegro
- In office 16 July 1917 – 11 October 1918
- Monarch: Charles I
- Minister-President of Austria: Ernst Seidler von Feuchtenegg; Max Hussarek von Heinlein
- Reich Minister of War: Rudolf Stöger-Steiner von Steinstätten
- Chief of the General Staff: Arthur Arz von Straußenburg
- Preceded by: Viktor Weber Edler von Webenau
- Succeeded by: Karl Freiherr von Pflanzer-Baltin

Personal details
- Born: 1 January 1863 Vienna, Austrian Empire
- Died: 7 March 1932 (aged 69) Klam, Austria

Heinrich Karl Maria Graf von Clam-Martinic (1 January 1863 in Vienna – 7 March 1932 in Klam) was an Austrian statesman. He was one of the last Prime Ministers in the Austrian half of the Austro-Hungarian empire, he was called during World War I to head a new cabinet by Emperor Charles on 13 December 1916, soon after the death of Emperor Franz Joseph on 21 November 1916. As Prime Minister, he replaced Ernest von Koerber, but his government only lasted until 30 May 1917. He was succeeded by Ernst Seidler von Feuchtenegg (1917-1918), Baron Max Hussarek von Heinlein (1918), and Heinrich Lammasch (1918).

His short-lived cabinet included well known contemporary Austrian figures such as Karl Urban and Joseph Baernreither. On 10 July 1917 Clam became, until the end of the war, Military Governor of occupied Montenegro, as successor of Viktor Weber Edler von Webenau. On 21 February 1918 the Emperor named him Knight in the Order of the Golden Fleece. He was a member of the Clam-Martinic family.

== See also ==
- Portrait
