= Ernst Seidler von Feuchtenegg =

Austrian statesman (1862–1931)

Ernst Ritter Seidler von Feuchtenegg
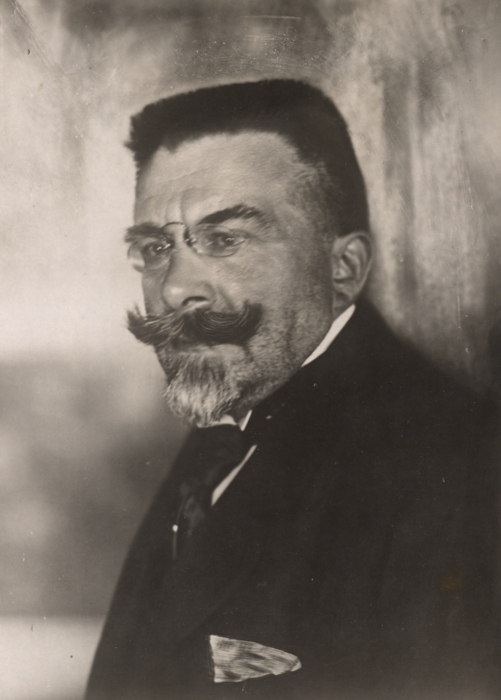
- Minister-president Feuchtenegg

Minister-President of Austria
- In office 23 June 1917 – 27 July 1918
- Monarch: Charles I
- Preceded by: Heinrich Clam-Martinic
- Succeeded by: Max Hussarek von Heinlein

Personal details
- Born: 5 June 1862 Schwechat, Lower Austria, Austrian Empire
- Died: 23 January 1931 (aged 68) Vienna, Austria

Ernst Wilhelm Engelhardt Ritter Seidler von Feuchtenegg (5 June 1862, Schwechat, Lower Austria – 23 January 1931, Vienna) was an Austrian statesman. He served as Minister-President of Austria from 1917 until 1918. His daughter was the actress Alma Seidler.
