= Damjan Popović =

Serbian general

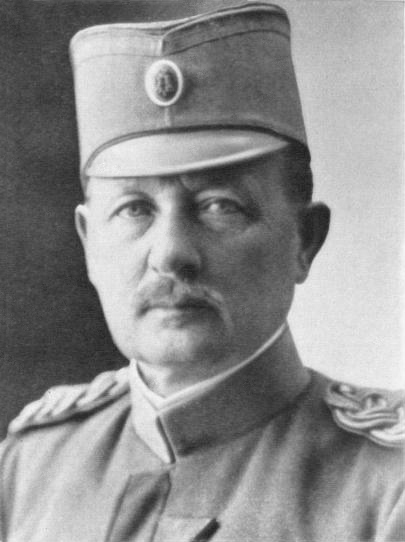
- Born: November 1, 1857; Ivanjica, Moravica District, Principality of Serbia
- Died: 1928 (aged 70–71); Belgrade, Yugoslavia
- Military career
- Allegiance: Principality of Serbia; Kingdom of Serbia
- Branch: Armed forces of the Principality of Serbia; Royal Serbian Army
- Service years: 1874 – 1906; 1913 – 1914; 1914 – 1917
- Rank: General
- Nickname: The Great Dacha
- Conflicts: Serbian–Turkish Wars (1876–1878); Serbo-Bulgarian War; Second Balkan War; World War I: Ovče Pole Offensive

Damjan Popović (Serbian Cyrillic: Дамјан Поповић; 1857–1928) was a Serbian general and participant in the Serbian–Turkish Wars, the Serbo-Bulgarian War, the Second Balkan War and the First World War.

== Biography ==
Damjan Popović was born on November 1, 1857. His parents' names are unknown. After finishing the 6th grade of the grammar school in Kragujevac, 1874. Popović enrolled in the Artillery School (11th grade) as 1st in rank. His classmates were future generals Mihailo Živković, Mihailo Rašić and Dukes Stepa Stepanović, Živojin Mišić, which made this generation one of the best. Due to the interruption of schooling, caused by the war with Turkey, he finished school in 1880 as the first in the rank of twenty-three cadets. In the 1887 until 1888, Popović resided in Odessa and St. Petersburg as a state cadet.

=== Officers' promotion ===
During the First Serbian-Turkish War, he was promoted to the rank of lieutenant on November 5, 1876. He became a lieutenant on October 20, 1882, a captain of the 2nd class on February 2, 1887, a captain of the 1st class on January 1, 1891, a major on February 22, 1893, a lieutenant colonel on February 22, 1897, and a colonel on April 6, 1901 and General on November 1, 1913.

=== Active military career ===
Even as pitomac- sergeant was sent to the war 1876. as an acting ordinance officer of the 1st class Uzice Brigade. In the period between the two wars, he was on duty in the same brigade and adjutant of the 8th Combined Battalion . In the Second Serbian-Turkish War, he was the acting ordinance officer at the Moravica Battalion, and then the commander of the 1st Company of the Combined Artillery Battalion. From this position, as an ordinance officer, he was transferred to the Javor Corps Headquarters.

After the wars, until 1880, he returned to the Artillery School to complete the course. Until the Serbo-Bulgarian War, he was a sergeant and acting commander of the 1st company of the engineering battalion. In the war with the Bulgarians, he held the position of commander of the engineering company of the Moravian Division. After the war, he did an internship at the railway command and at the Belgrade railway station. Then he was the head of the Kragujevac railway station, then the head of traffic on the Lapovo - Kragujevac line . After returning from Russia, in December 1888. he was appointed commander of the 2nd Company in the 1st Engineering Battalion. Then he became first acting, and from May 1893 and commander of the same battalion, and from October 1894, he was the acting officer of the Danube Divisional Area (at the end of 1895 he was confirmed at that position). In December of the same year, he was appointed a member of the Engineering Committee of the Ministry of War. In addition to all these duties, he participated in the works on the fortification of Pirot and Niš.

In August 1899, Popović was appointed head of the Engineering and Technical Department of the Ministry of War, and in addition to this duty, in February 1900, he was appointed to the position of the king's aide. In the following period, he changed a number of positions. From October 1901 until April 1902, Popović was the commander of the Sumadija Infantry Brigade, and then the inspector of the engineering command of the Active Army. At the same time, from mid-August 1903 and he was also appointed a member of the Higher Military Council. The May Coup found him in the position of commander of the Pirot fortifications.

He was in the delegation that brought King Peter I from Geneva. For a short time, 1903-1904, he was again an adjutant, then King Peter I, and then until May 1906 . in the position of Commander of the Danube Divisional Area. From this place, at his request, and due to the pressure of the English government, together with a group of senior officers, he retired. At the beginning of the First Balkan War, he was still retired. It was reactivated only on January 14, 1913 and a few days later, he was appointed commander of the titled Coastal troops. In the attack on Brdica, in February 1913, during the Siege of Scutari, his troops suffered heavy losses due to fatigue, hunger and the superior position of the enemy and about 1,800 casualties were reported. After this defeat, Popović was removed from his command position.

In the Second Balkan War, he was the commander of the Pirot fortifications. During the Arnaut rebellion, he commanded the troops of the New Areas. He retired for the second time in April 1914 . years due to the negative reaction regarding the Regulation on the priority of government. In June 1914, it was reactivated. During the First World War, he was again the commander of the new areas, until October 1916, when he was placed at the disposal of the Supreme Command. In February 1917 for the third time finally retired permanently. At the directed Thessaloniki trial, he was first sentenced to 10 years in prison, so his sentence was increased to 20 years, to which the famous Louise Paget reacted sharply stating that if General Damjan Popović was convicted and shot as an alleged criminal, she would never set foot in Serbia again. In all the above-mentioned duties, 1897-1899, he was a member in 1905 and chairman of examination commissions for the rank of major.

Damjan Popović was worried that the United States would not help Serbia, because one of their generals drove the American delegation off the train. He asked Delfa Ivanić to mediate and asked Louise Paget to convince the American delegation of the needs of our country and people and to mitigate in some way this accident that that officer did. She agreed and everyone that on February 12, 1915, with the delegation, went to dinner at a restaurant near Vardar in Skopje. Henry James was the secretary of that delegation, and otherwise he was the president of American writers.

== Awards ==
- Order of Karađorđe's Star, 3rd Class with Swords
- Order of the White Eagle, 5th Class
- Order of the Cross of Takovo, 4th and 5th Ckass
- Silver medal for bravery
- War Memorial 1876—1878.

== Bibliography ==
- Milićević, Milić; Popović, Ljubodrag (2003). Generali Vojske Kneževnine i Kraljevine Srbije. Vojnoizdavački zavod. ISBN 978-86-335-0142-2.
- Opačić, Petar (2008). Vojvoda Živojin Mišić (2. ed.). Belgrade: BeoSing. ISBN 978-86-87187-00-9.
