= Max Hussarek von Heinlein =

Austrian politician

Max Freiherr Hussarek von Heinlein
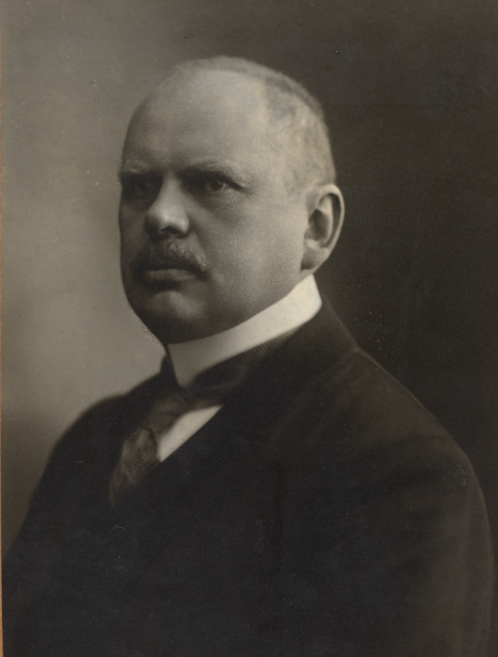
- Minister-president Hussarek, c. 1918

Minister-President of Austria
- In office 25 July 1918 – 27 October 1918
- Monarch: Charles I
- Preceded by: Ernst Seidler von Feuchtenegg
- Succeeded by: Heinrich Lammasch

Personal details
- Born: 3 May 1865 Pressburg, Hungary, Austrian Empire
- Died: 6 March 1935 (aged 69) Vienna, Austria
- Party: Christian Social Party

Maximilian Hussarek von Heinlein (3 May 1865 – 6 March 1935), ennobled to the rank of Baron (Freiherr) in 1917, was an Austrian statesman who served as the penultimate Minister-President of Cisleithania in the last stage of World War I, for three months in 1918.

== Life ==
Hussarek was born in Pressburg, Hungary (present-day Bratislava, Slovakia), the son of Johann Ritter Hussarek von Heinlein (1819–1907), a lieutenant field marshal in the Austro-Hungarian Army. He attended school in Lemberg (Lviv), Galicia, in Hermannstadt (Sibiu), and at the Theresian Academy in Vienna. In 1883, he enrolled at the University of Vienna to study canon law, obtaining his doctorate sub auspiciis Imperatoris in 1889. He went on to give lectures at the Theresian Academy and became an educator of Prince Abbas II, the future Khedive of Egypt.

From 1892, Hussarek served at the k.k. Ministry of Education and Cultural Affairs and also worked as a private lecturer. In 1895 he was appointed professor of ecclesiastical law at the Vienna University. Two years later he was appointed head of the Ministry's Catholic Church department; from 1907, he led the Office of Religious Affairs.

A member of the Christian Social Party, Hussarek served as Education Minister in the Cisleithanian cabinets of Karl von Stürgkh, Ernest von Koerber, and Heinrich Clam-Martinic from 1911 to 1917. He worked for the recognition of Evangelical professorships at the theological department of the Vienna University and had Sunni Islam, according to the Hanafi school of jurisprudence, acknowledged as a religious community. In 1917, he was elevated to the rank of Freiherr by Emperor Charles I of Austria, a title he lost again after the dissolution of Austria-Hungary only two years later.

When after the conclusion of the Treaty of Brest-Litovsk with the Ukrainian People's Republic, Minister-president Ernst Seidler von Feuchtenegg resigned on 25 July 1918, Hussarek was appointed his successor. Facing the American entry into World War I, and the disintegration of the Austro-Hungarian Monarchy, as well as rapidly deteriorating supply conditions, he tried in vain to hinder the collapse by an Imperial manifesto (Völkermanifest). The manifesto was issued by Charles I on October 16, granting wide-range autonomy to the Cisleithanian nations. The declaration failed: while several constituent national assemblies convened in the Austrian crown lands, the manifesto was rejected by the Hungarian minister-president Sándor Wekerle and two days later the Budapest government officially terminated the Austro-Hungarian Compromise of 1867.

Hussarek resigned on October 27, the Cisleithanian cabinet of his successor Heinrich Lammasch was already referred to as "liquidation ministry".

After the war, Hussarek again worked as a professor at the University of Vienna and as an official of the Austrian Red Cross. He died in Vienna in 1935, aged 69.
