= Heinrich Lammasch =

Austrian jurist and prime minister

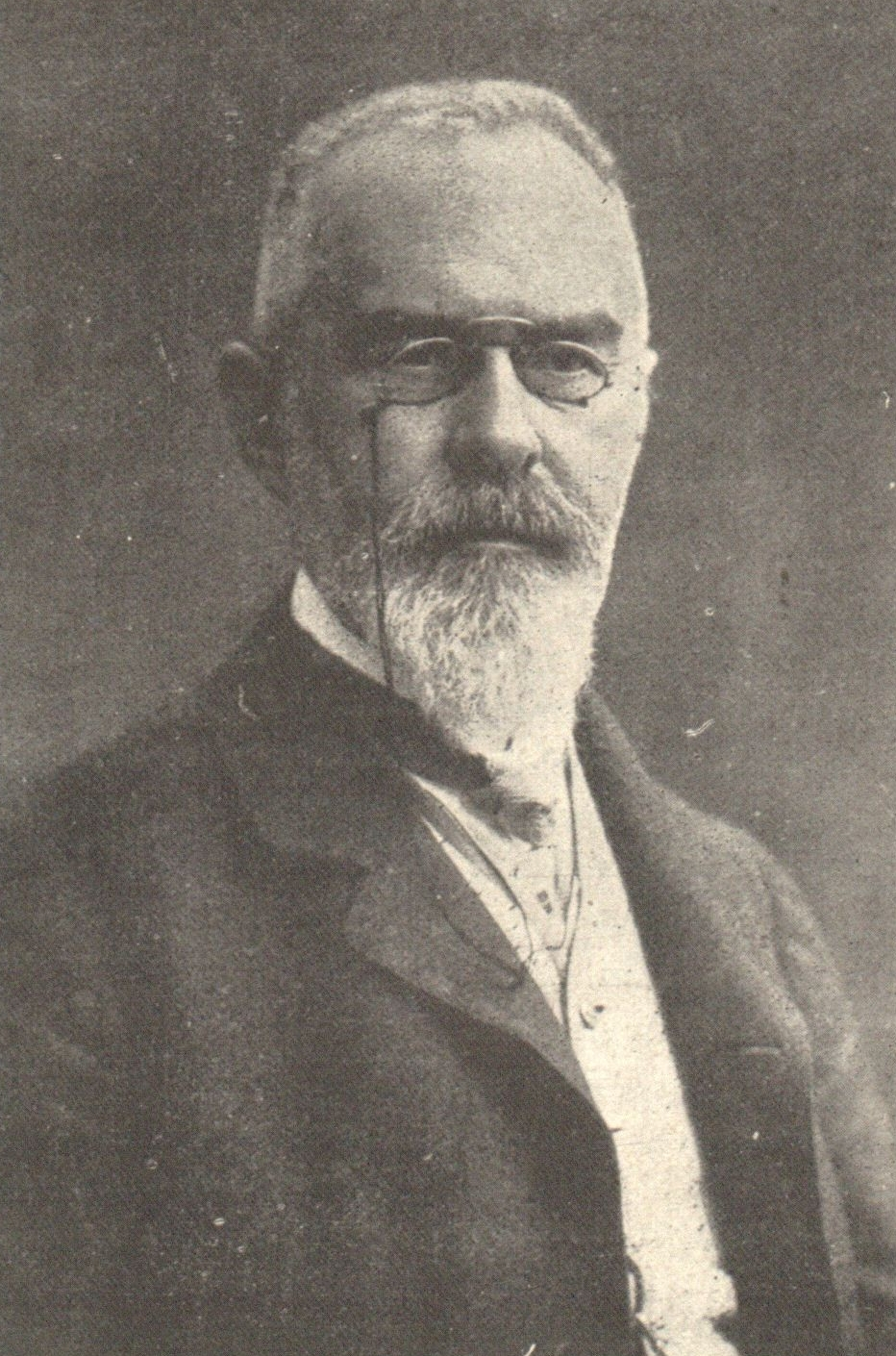
- Lammasch about 1910

Minister-President of Austria
- In office 27 October 1918 – 11 November 1918
- Monarch: Charles I
- Preceded by: Max Hussarek von Heinlein
- Succeeded by: Karl Renner (State Chancellor of German-Austria)

Personal details
- Born: 21 May 1853 Seitenstetten, Lower Austria, Austrian Empire
- Died: 6 January 1920 (aged 66) Salzburg, Austria
- Party: Christian Social Party

Heinrich Lammasch (21 May 1853 – 6 January 1920) was an Austrian jurist. He was a professor of criminal and international law, a member of the Hague Arbitration Tribunal, and served as the last Minister-President of Austria (or Cisleithania) for a few weeks in October and November 1918. He was the first and only Minister-President in the Austrian half of the Habsburg Monarchy to have been a commoner, although he was not the first to have been born one by any means.

== Biography ==
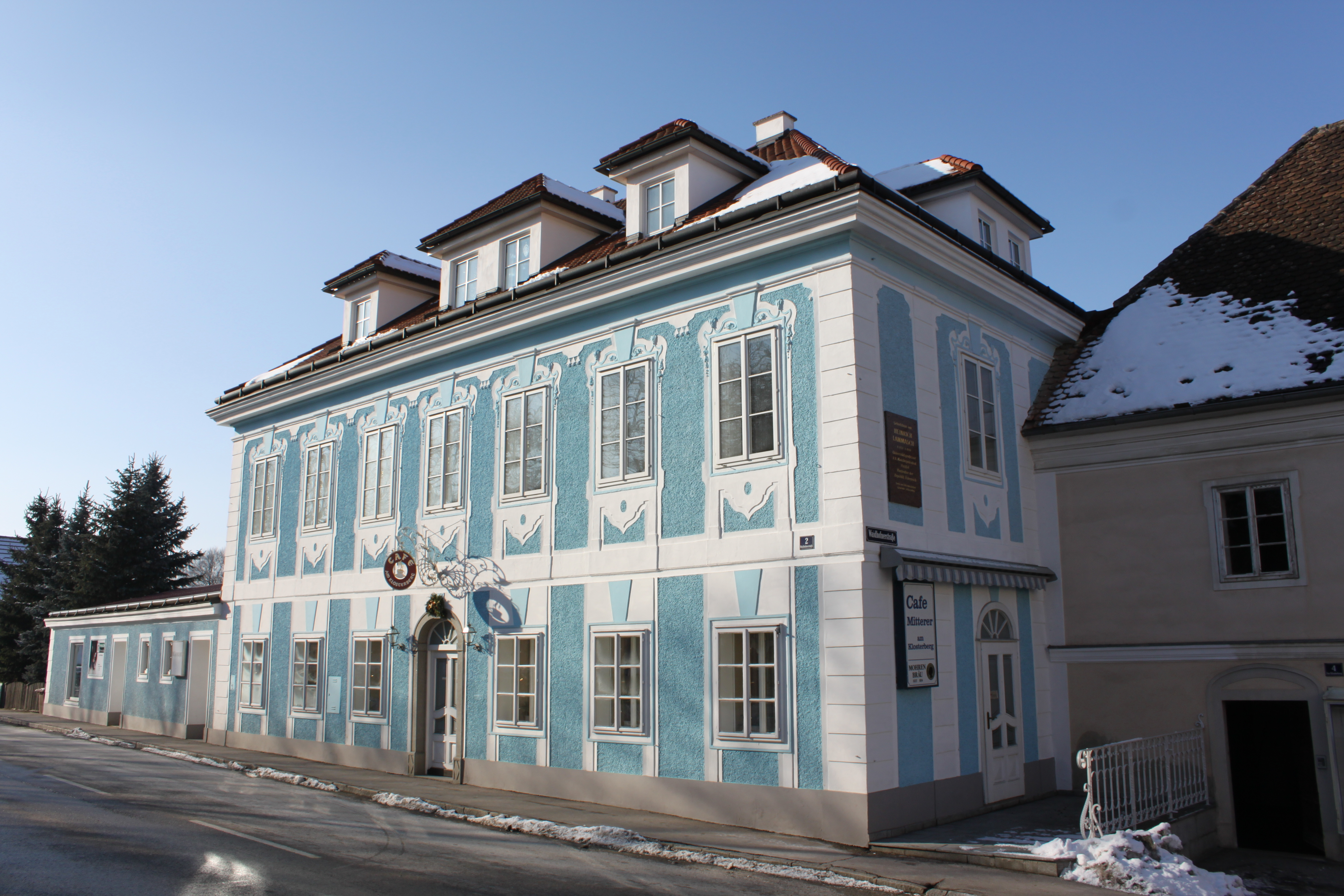
Lammasch's birthplace in Seitenstetten

He was born in Seitenstetten, Lower Austria, the son of notary Heinrich Lammasch sen. (1823–1865) and his wife Anna née Schauenstein (1829–1891). Soon after his birth, the family moved to Wiener Neustadt and from there to Vienna. Upon the early death of his father, Lammasch attended the Schottengymnasium and studied law at the University of Vienna, obtaining his doctorate in 1876.

Having traveled extensively through Germany, France and the United Kingdom, he qualified for the criminal law teaching faculty at the Vienna University in 1879. His pioneer pamphlet on the objective danger in the conception of attempted crime won for him in 1882 an extraordinary professorship, and in 1885 a full professorship at the University of Innsbruck. In 1893 he openly opposed a regressive draft penal law enacted by Minister-President Prince Windisch-Grätz.

In 1889, Lammasch returned to Vienna and there became an advocate of the idea of a league of nations in the spirit of Christian philosophy. He became an international arbitrator who participated in the Hague Conventions of 1899 and 1907. A member of the Permanent Court of Arbitration, he arranged the Newfoundland dispute between Great Britain and the United States, and the Orinoco dispute between the latter and Venezuela.

In 1899 Emperor Franz Joseph I appointed Lammasch a member of the Austrian House of Lords. He also acted as legal advisor of Archduke Franz Ferdinand. On the eve of World War I, he warned against the rapprochement with the German Empire and favoured an agreement with the Western Entente powers. During the war, he joined the international peace movement and, in July 1917, urged for a separate peace with the Allies. However, his proposals were brusquely rejected by Foreign Minister Ottokar Czernin.

In the last days of the war, Lammasch was appointed Minister-President by Emperor Charles I on 27 October 1918, succeeding Baron Max Hussarek von Heinlein. It had become apparent that the crumbling Austro-Hungarian Empire had practically no ability to control events outside of Vienna. The minority state councils of the Empire were acting more or less as provisional governments. Charles' empire was effectively reduced to the mostly German-speaking Alpine and Danubian crown lands, and the government's authority was even being challenged there by the state council elected by the Provisional National Assembly of German-Austria.

Minister-President Lammasch was called a liquidator by the Austrian press, since it was thought he was presiding over the end of the empire. On 30 October, the German-Austrian state council named Karl Renner as State Chancellor. When the German emperor Wilhelm II abdicated on 9 November, Lammasch realised the situation was untenable. He entered into negotiations with Chancellor Renner and advised Emperor Charles to give up his right to exercise sovereign authority. Accordingly, on 11 November, Charles issued a statement in which he acknowledged Austria's right to determine the form of the state and relinquished his right to take part in the country's politics. He also released the officials in the Austrian half of the empire from their oath of loyalty to him and dismissed the Lammasch government from office. The statement effectively ended the Habsburgs' 636-year rule over Austria.

Shortly afterward, the state council proclaimed the Republic of German-Austria. Lammasch was sent to represent Austria at St. Germain. He died in Salzburg in 1920, aged 66.

== Honours ==
- Austria-Hungary:
  - Knight of the Iron Crown, 3rd Class, 1898
  - Commander of the Order of Franz Joseph, with Star, 1905
  - Commander of the Imperial Order of Leopold, 1909

== Notes ==
Political offices
Preceded by Max Hussarek von Heinlein	Minister-President of Austria; 1918	Succeeded by Karl Renner as State Chancellor of German-Austria
