= Liebenberg =

Liebenberg is a surname, and may refer to:

- Adolf von Liebenberg, Austrian scientist
- Andreas Liebenberg (1938–1998), South African military officer
- Anrune Liebenberg, South African para-athlete
- Brian Liebenberg, South African-born French rugby player
- Chris Liebenberg, South African banker
- Frederik Ludvig Liebenberg (1810–1894), Danish writer and publisher
- Gerhardus Liebenberg, South African cricket player
- Hanro Liebenberg, South African rugby player
- Hercú Liebenberg, South African rugby player
- Karl Liebenberg, South African cricket umpire
- Lauren Liebenberg, Zimbabwean writer
- Lee-Anne Liebenberg, South African model
- Petrus Johannes Liebenberg (1857–1950), Boer war general
- Riaan Liebenberg, South African paralympic athlete
- RJ Liebenberg, South African rugby player
- Tiaan Liebenberg, South African rugby player
- Wiaan Liebenberg, South African rugby player

== See also ==
- Liebenberg and Kaplan, an American architectural firm (1920s–1950s)
- Liebenberg syndrome, a rare autosomal genetic disease
- Liebenberg v The Master, a South African succession law case
