= Salis-Seewis =

Salis-Seewis may refer to:

== People ==
- Johann von Salis-Seewis (1862–1940), Austro-Hungarian military officer
- Johann Gaudenz von Salis-Seewis (1762–1834), Swiss poet

== Other ==
- Count de Salis-Seewis, a primogenitive title.
