= The Twelve Abbots of Challant =

1981 novel by Laura Mancinelli

- First edition cover (Italian)
- Author: Laura Mancinelli
- Original title: I dodici abati di Challant
- Translator: Sarah E. Christopher and Colleen Regalbuto
- Language: Italian
- Genre: Historical novel
- Publisher: Einaudi (Italy); Troubador (UK)
- Publication date: 1981
- Publication place: Italy
- English publication date: 2003
- Media type: Print (paperback)
- Pages: 216 pp
- ISBN: 1-89-929354-X
- OCLC: 53243562

The Twelve Abbots of Challant (Italian: I dodici abati di Challant) is a novel by Laura Mancinelli published in 1981 and winner of the Mondello Prize in the same year.

Translation in English - Sarah E. Christopher, Colleen Regalbuto

The story is set around the end of the 13th century in a castle perched in the mountains of the Aosta Valley and lasts a year, from the death of the old marquis to the fire in the castle. The only external environment is the wood; the internal environments are the rooms of the castle.

== Plot summary ==
A feudal lord inherits a castle with the condition of maintaining faith in an evil obligation of chastity. Twelve abbots take on the task of watching over the commitment, but they all disappear in a succession of mysterious deaths, victims of banal and emblematic incidents. Beautiful and unscrupulous Madonnas, castellans and priests, philosophers persecuted by the Inquisition, squires and monks, devils and sulphurous spells, testamentary readings and carnal temptations, audacious and holy tetragons and then again ... the beautiful Maravì sleepless in love, nostalgia, evening horseback riding, inventors and transplant surgeons in the odor of heresy and even a child and his cat Miro.

In the novel many characters are presented, some appearing only in one chapter (like the merchant, the inventor, the astrologer), others who return after some time for a brief appearance (like the troubadour and the philosopher). Each of them represents a social class of the Middle Ages.

== Characters ==
Nobles

- Duke Franchino of Mantua; protagonist of the story together with the marquise. Blond, slim, with blue eyes. For these reasons he should have been (and perhaps even wanted to be) a minstrel, not to mention that he enjoyed composing songs with his viola. He had regretted signing the will, not only because he had to remain chaste, but also because he was incapable of administering a territory, with all its attendant hassles. But he had accepted because it seemed bad not to accept, because that is the way it is usually done; why, he did not know himself. Perpetually in love, even though he did not know how to love. Jealous of all the castle guests who courted Madonna Bianca di Challant, so much so that he threw out the troubadour.
- Marquise Bianca of Challant; very beautiful woman, loved by many, including the duke, the philosopher, the troubadour and Abbot Mistral. She used to go out on horseback in the evening before sunset. Sometimes he rode Hippomenes, a proud white horse with a slow and solemn trot; sometimes he rode Yvars, a black, agile, nervous and quick horse. With Ippomele she wore all white: white was her cloak, white her veil, white was the big hat placed on her veil; with Yvars, instead, she wore all black. But she was beautiful on both occasions.

Visitors to the castle

- Enrico of Morazzone; an inventor arrives at the castle in a cart mounted on a sledge and pulled by two horses to sell his products. He leaves Abbot Nevoso a spring-loaded sleigh, where, unable to use it, he dies.
- the philosopher; arrived at the castle on a horse, wearing a cloak that covered him completely and also a pointed hat, which students usually wear, adorned with two very long and wavy feathers: one green-yellow cockerel and one very candid swan. Graduated from the Sorbonne in Paris, he was expelled from the city accused of heresy, because with his thought and the basis of Abelard, a philosopher who was also a heretic, he had, in a certain way, given the doctrine of Mohammed as being equally valid.
- the wise priestess; wore a long, feathered cape that went down from his head, which was fitted with a sort of hood, to his feet, enveloping his robust body in its breadth and hiding his tawny, frizzy hair.
- Madonna Maravì; came from the Angevin Court of Naples. She had curly auburn hair and fell in love with Messer Goffredo da Salerno. In order to seduce him, she decided to dress in a cherry-red satin dress, edged at the neckline and sleeves: the red of the dress accentuated the red of her hair and the whiteness of her neck and breasts, which generously appeared from the wide neckline. But Goffredo wanted nothing to do with her; he even avoided her. So Maravì fell ill: red, slightly swollen eyes, chapped lips and a shabby hairstyle were the symptoms of the love disease. When, blinded by rage, she had thrown a large chess piece out of the window at a man who appeared to her to be Goffredo, she had killed Abbot Foscolo.
- The Venetian merchant; was an imposing man, perhaps in his fifties, with traces of recent beauty in his noble face and expressive eyes. He was dressed in long black velvet stockings over which fell a large red cloth jacket, the folds of which were held in place at the waist by a high belt; over this he wore a short cape, black like his stockings, and very large. His clothing showed that he was a man accustomed to the affluence of Venice at that time.
- The troubadour with beautiful skin, blue eyes and blond hair, the Marquise immediately fall in love with him, thanks to his mastery of music.
- The astrologer came to the castle one summer evening accompanied by the marquise, who had met him on her usual horseback ride.

The twelve abbots

- Nevoso - sturdy and corpulent young man, but lazy and comfort-loving.
- Umidio - suffers from numerous pains, which he tries to alleviate by taking herbs, the same ones that in excessive doses will cause his death.
- Celorio - a sick and cold old man, perpetually seeking the warmth of the fireplace, dies crushed under the weight of a large pot.
- Foscolo - a know-it-all and authoritarian priest who sees in Cicco the son of sin, is killed by a chess tower, which Madonna Maravì had thrown out of the window, because she thought he was someone else.
- Mistral - will leave the castle because he is in love with the marquise.
- Leonzio - a red-haired and red-skinned priest with divergent eyes, who likes women a lot. While chasing his beloved, the abbot bumps into a rose bush, choking to death.
- Santoro - a silent and apparently modest little man, so much so that the courtiers are not aware of his existence, his aim is to convert the Marquise to the true faith. Unsuccessful, he sets off.
- Malbruno - falls ill at his loins during a grape harvest. He dies from overdoing the treatment recommended by Ser Goffredo.
- Torchiato - verbose and limp, he loses no opportunity to 'answer' the marquise about her easy virtues. He dies during a feast at the castle, having eaten and drunk too much.
- Prudenzio - is a young and gentle abbot, always ready to smile in order to seduce the women of the court, and for this very reason he will die.
- Ildebrando - is the last abbot remaining at the castle after the disappearance of the other eleven; he accuses the marquise and all the courtiers of being unfaithful and threatens to burn down the castle, an action he performs the same evening, but finds death in the flames.
- Ipocondrio - is tall and suffers from gall; he argues that a child should not possess a flute, because music and dancing only lead to perdition; he dies falling from the highest castle wall, following the very sound of a flute, probably Cicco's.

== See also ==
- Aosta Valley
- Graines Castle
- Angevin
