= Johann Gaudenz von Salis-Seewis =

Swiss poet

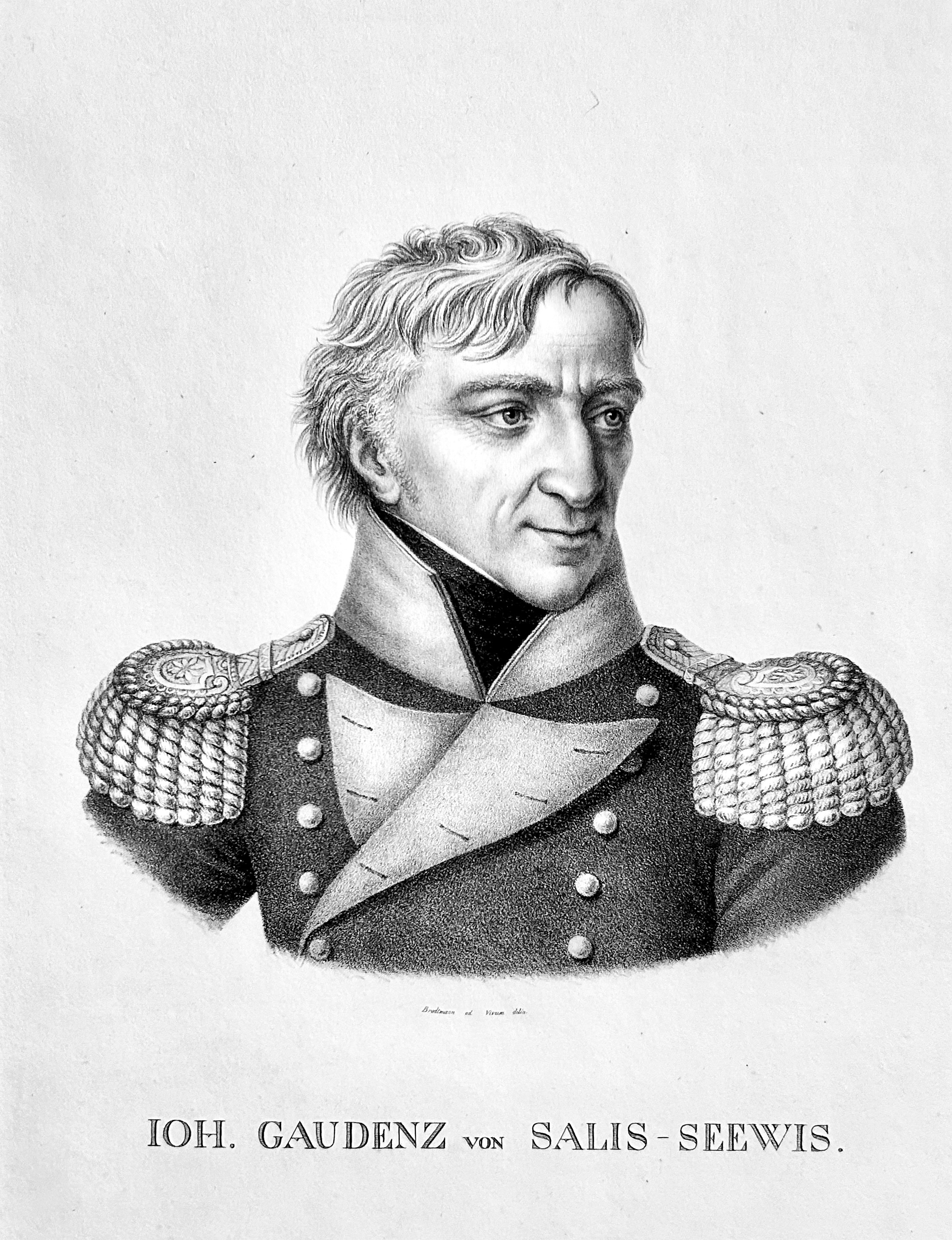
- Portrait by Karl Joseph Brodtmann, 1826
- Born: 26 December 1762; Malans, Switzerland
- Died: 29 January 1834 (aged 71); Malans, Switzerland
- Relatives: Johann von Salis-Seewis

Johann Gaudenz Gubert Graf (and Freiherr) von Salis-Seewis (26 December 1762 (Note: Sources disagree on the date: the German National Library's authority record gives 26 December 1762, while the HDS gives 20 December 1762.) – 29 January 1834) was a Swiss poet, writer, military officer, politician and librettist.

== Life ==
Salis-Seewis was born in Malans, and came from an old Swiss aristocracy. His father, baron Johann Ulrich von Salis-Seewis (1740–1815), was created a (primogenitive) Comte (count) at Versailles on 1 February 1777 having married Freiin Jakobea von Salis-Bothmar (1741–1791) in 1760. The Reichs-freiherrdom dated back to 20 January 1588, for Dietegan von Salis.

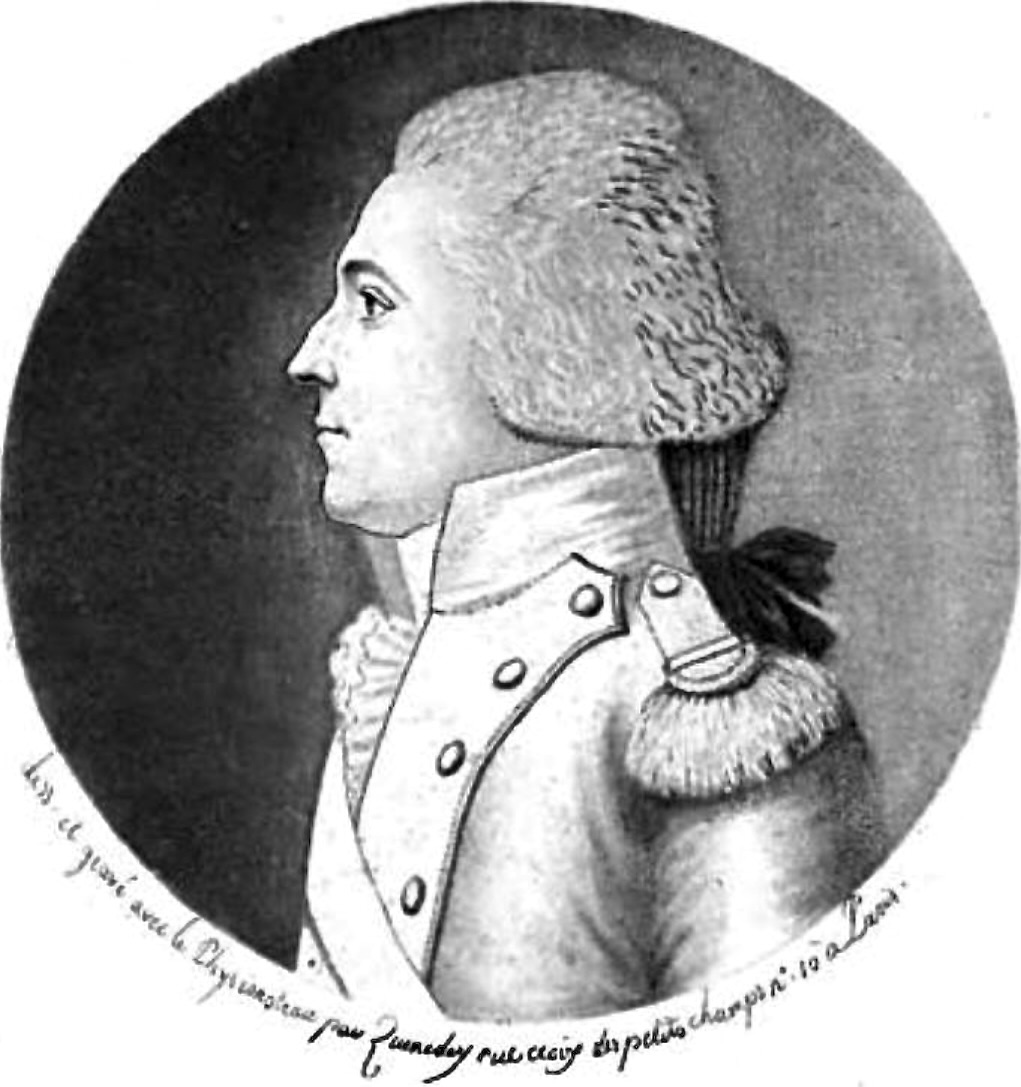
Physionotrace by Edme Quenedey, c. 1790

Between 1779 and 1789 Salis served as an officer in the Swiss Guards in France in Paris, France, until the French Revolution made him quit. Salis-Seewis was one of the favourites of Marie Antoinette. In the next year Salis-Seewis undertook a journey to the Netherlands and Germany (including Weimar), meeting Goethe, Herder, Schiller, Wieland, and Matthisson. He particularly connected with Matthisson, and an intimate friendship developed. The poet colleagues of the Sturm und Drang and Empfindsamkeit dubbed him the "Bündner Nachtigall" (Graubünden nightingale).

Salis-Seewis returned to Switzerland in 1791, living in Chur and marrying there, on 26 December 1793, the 22-year-old Ursina von Pestalozzi (Chur 29 September 1771 - Malans 27 June 1835). They had two sons; Johann-Ulrich Dietegan (Comte) von Salis-Seewis (1794–1844) and Johann-Jakob (Freiherr) von Salis-Seewis (1800–1881). He had a lively involvement in the political changes in his homeland over the next years lively involved, endorsed the alliance of the Three Leagues of Switzerland to the new France, and the proclaimed Helvetic Republic. After the area was occupied by Austria in the following year, Salis-Seewis and his family had to flee to Zurich. There, he was appointed inspector general of the Helvetican troops. This activity brought him the nickname "poet general". He later went to Bern and received a place on the Court of cassation. When the Act of Mediation was issued by Napoleon Bonaparte in 1803, it became possible for Salis-Seewis to return to Graubünden. There he held several public offices until 1817, then he withdrew as Swiss federal colonel. His father had died two years before.

== Artistic work ==
Salis-Seewis and Matthisson had similar writing styles, both being inclined to write about natural topics, and about their homeland. The poems of Salis Seewis are characterised however by more masculinity, freshness, popularity as well as a deeper sense of yearning. His elegies have always had a firm and determining reason. Done with the revolutionary thoughts of the French revolution, he was a progressive representative of human rights and separated from the conservative, oligarchic tradition of his family, which controlled the Three Leagues unquestioned over decades. He died in Malans.

Franz Schubert has set many poems of Salis-Seewis to music, like Abschied von der Harfe, Das Grab or Zum Rundtanz. His best known work is Herbstlied, written in 1782, set to music in 1799 by both Johann Friedrich Reichardt and Schubert.

== Sources ==
- "DNB, Katalog der Deutschen Nationalbibliothek". portal.dnb.de (in German). 2021-07-01.
- (in Italian) Laura Mancinelli: Il canto di un contadino in terra straniera: ritratto di J. Gaudenz von Salis-Seewis, Cenobio 1958.
- Christian Erni: Von Paris nach Weimar. Johann Gaudenz von Salis-Seewis in der Französischen Revolution auf Urlaubsreise nach Weimar 1789-1790. In: Jahrbuch der Historischen Gesellschaft von Graubünden. 1995.
- Hans Peter Gansner: Der Dichter-General. Eine dramatische Biographie des J. G. von Salis-Seewis. Mit einem Essay des Authors über J. G. von Salis-Seewis und Ferdinand Freiligrath sowie einigen Nachbemerkungen. Calven, Chur 2003. ISBN 3-905261-27-8
- Johann Gaudenz von Salis–Seewis und Johann Heinrich Füßli in ihren Briefen, hrsg. v. Felix Humm. Huber, Bern u.a. 1976.
- Emil Jenal: Johann Gaudenz v.Salis-Seewis und die eidgenössische Wiedergeburt. Schuler, Chur 1924.
- Alfred Rufer: Johann Gaudenz v. Salis–Seewis als Bündner Patriot und Helvetischer Generalstab. Bischofberger, Chur 1938.
- Johann Ulrich Schlegel: Die Beziehungen zwischen Johann Gaudenz von Salis und Ignaz Heinrich von Wessenberg. Juris, Zürich 1976. ISBN 3-260-04126-5
- Walter Zindel-Kuoni: Johann Gaudenz von Salis-Seewis. Landschaft seiner Lieder und Geschichte seiner Zeit. Desertina, Chur 2006. ISBN 978-3-85637-328-3
