= Laura Mancinelli =

Italian writer, Germanist, medievalist and university professor

Laura Mancinelli OMRI
- Born: 18 December 1933; Udine, Friuli-Venezia Giulia, Kingdom of Italy
- Died: 7 July 2016 (aged 82); Turin, Piedmont, Italy
- Resting place: Exilles Cemetery, Exilles, Piedmont, Italy, IT
- Education: University of Turin
- Occupations: writer, author of novels, Germanist and translator, medievalist
- Writing career
- Notable works: The Song of the Nibelungs. Problems and values The Twelve Abbots of Challant; The Miracle of Saint Odilia

Laura Mancinelli OMRI (18 December 1933 – 7 July 2016) was an Italian writer, Germanist, medievalist and university professor.

Mancinelli also wrote academic texts, children's books, essays (numerous of medieval history), and novels.

== Life ==
Laura Mancinelli was born in Udine in 1933, then, after a period of short stays between Rovereto and Mantua where she spent her early childhood, in 1937 the family moved permanently to Turin. In the first half of the 1940s, at the height of conflict, he was forced to evacuate on more than one occasion, together with his parents and brothers, due to the incessant bombing of the city, which was the country’s main industrial centre at the time.

After her school education and studies, she graduated from the University of Turin in 1956 with a degree in German literature with a focus on modern literature.

In the years following her doctorate she taught without ever giving up her passion for medieval German culture. In 1969 she wrote the essay The Song of the Nibelungs. Problems and values.

In the 1970s she taught Germanic philology at the University of Sassari and then called in Venice by the Germanist Ladislao Mittner, in 1976 she founded the Department of History of German Language at the University of Venice.

On the advice of his colleague and friend, Claudio Magris, in 1972 she edited and translated into Italian from the original volume, the Nibelungenlied, followed in 1978 by Tristan (Gottfried von Straßburg) and in 1989 by Gregorius and Poor Heinrich (Hartmann von Aue).

In the early 1990s, affected by multiple sclerosis, Laura Mancinelli left the Chair of German philology.

Mancinelli died on 7 July 2016 in Turin as a result of her illness. The farewell ceremony took place on 11 July 2016 in the monumental cemetery of Turin; the funeral took place in Exilles in the Susa Valley, where the writer had set one of her novels.

== Career ==
=== Writing career ===
After returning to Turin as holder of the University Chair of Germanic philology, in 1981 Laura Mancinelli made her debut in fiction, publishing, The Twelve Abbots of Challant (winner the same year of the Mondello Prize), a historical novel that the author had begun to write in 1968. After came Il fantasma di Mozart in 1986 and The Miracle of Saint Odilia in 1989.

Other works were: Amadé, a tale of Mozart's journey in Turin as an adolescent; La casa del tempo, Gli occhi dell'imperatore, winner of the Rapallo Prize in 1994, Raskolnikov, I tre cavalieri del Graal and Il principe scalzo. In 1999, the theatrical performance Notte con Mozart, based on the play of the same name in two acts (published in 1991), was performed at Regio in Turin.

From 1994 onwards, she devoted herself entirely to writing and published more than fifteen works throughout the decade, despite hospital stays and lengthy rehabilitation.

In 2001, La sacra rappresentazione (The holy representation) came out in bookshops. It recounts the handover of the Fortress of Exilles from France (Dauphiné) to Savoy, which took place after a night of revelry by the French garrison in 1708. In the same year, the author was simultaneously working on an autobiographical novel that occupied her for several years and was published in 2002 under the title Andante con tenerezza.

In 2009 she published the novel Gli occhiali di Cavour, followed by Due storie d'amore in 2011, free interpretations of the story of two famous couples, Kriemhild and Siegfried, Tristan and Iseult.

== Bibliography ==
=== Novels ===
- I dodici abati di Challant (1981; English translation: The Twelve Abbots of Challant, 2003)
- Il fantasma di Mozart (1986)
- Il miracolo di santa Odilia (1989; English translation: The Miracle of Saint Odilia, 2003)
- Amadé (1990)
- La casa del tempo (1993)
- Gli occhi dell'imperatore (1994)
- Raskolnikov (1996)
- I tre cavalieri del Graal (1996)
- Il principe scalzo (1999)
- La musica dell'isola (2000)
- Attentato alla Sindone (2000)
- La lunga notte di Exilles (2001)
- Biglietto d'amore (2002)
- I colori del cuore (2005)
- Un misurato esercizio della cattiveria (2005)
- Il ragazzo dagli occhi neri (2007)
- Natale sotto la Mole (2008)
- Due storie d'amore (2011)
- Un peccatore innocente (2013)

== Translation of Classics of Austrian and German Literature ==
- (in Italian) Nibelungenlied, Turin: Einaudi, 1972
- (in Italian) Gottfried von Strassburg, Tristan, Turin: Einaudi, 1978
- (in Italian) Heimito von Doderer, I demoni. Dalla cronaca del caposezione Geyrenhoff, Turin: Einaudi, 1979
- (in Italian) Hartmann von Aue, Gregorio and Il povero Enrico, Turin: Einaudi, 1989
- (in Italian) Konrad Bayer, The Head of Vitus Bering, Alessandria: Edizioni dell'Orso, 1993

== Honours ==
=== National honours ===
- Grand Officer of the Order of Merit of the Italian Republic (26 May 2005)

== See also ==
- Philology
- Germanic philology
- German literature
- History of German
- Minnesang
- Codex Manesse

== Sources ==
- Anderson, Helen Victoria (2010), Historical and detective fiction in Italy 1950-2006 : Calvino, Malerba and Mancinelli, D. Phil. University of Oxford
- (in Italian) Buzzoni, Marina (2018), Gli occhi di Laura, I libri di Ca' Foscari, vol. 7, Ca' Foscari University of Venice, doi:10.30687/978-88-6969-262-8/023, hdl:10278/3704205, ISBN 978-88-6969-263-5, S2CID 188866924
- (in Italian) Buzzoni, Marina (2018), "Gli occhi di Laura", in Le lingue occidentali nei 150 anni di storia di Ca’ Foscari (PDF), I libri di Ca' Foscari, vol. 7, Ca' Foscari University of Venice
- (in Italian) Burgio, Eugenio (2019), "L’ultima apparizione di Gregorio, peccatore e santo". Laura Mancinelli, Un peccatore innocente in Un viaggio realmente avvenuto (PDF), Italianistica. Nuova serie, vol. 10, Ca' Foscari University of Venice
