= Count de Salis-Seewis =

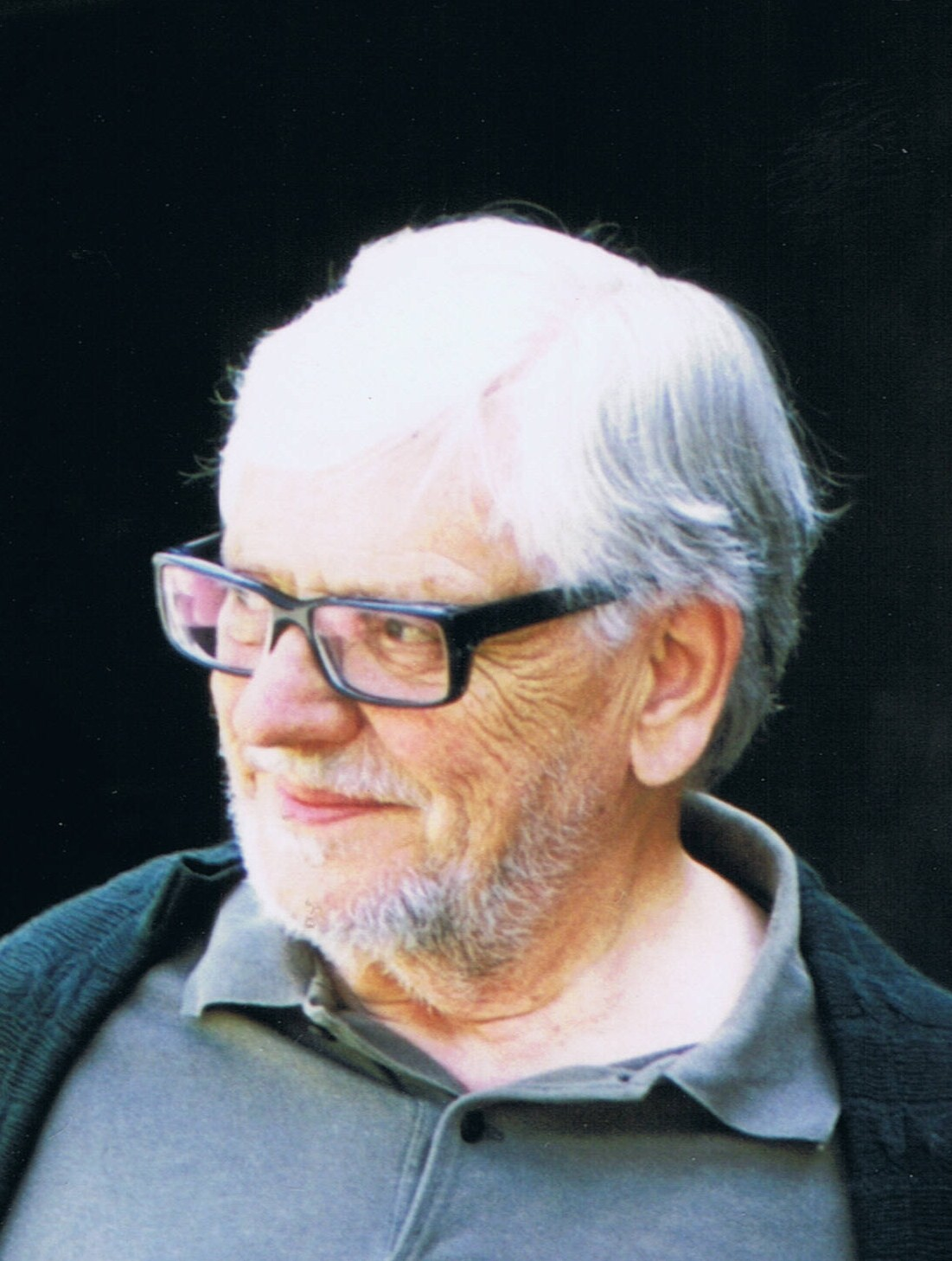
Gaudenz von Salis, current Count de Salis-Seewis (2005)

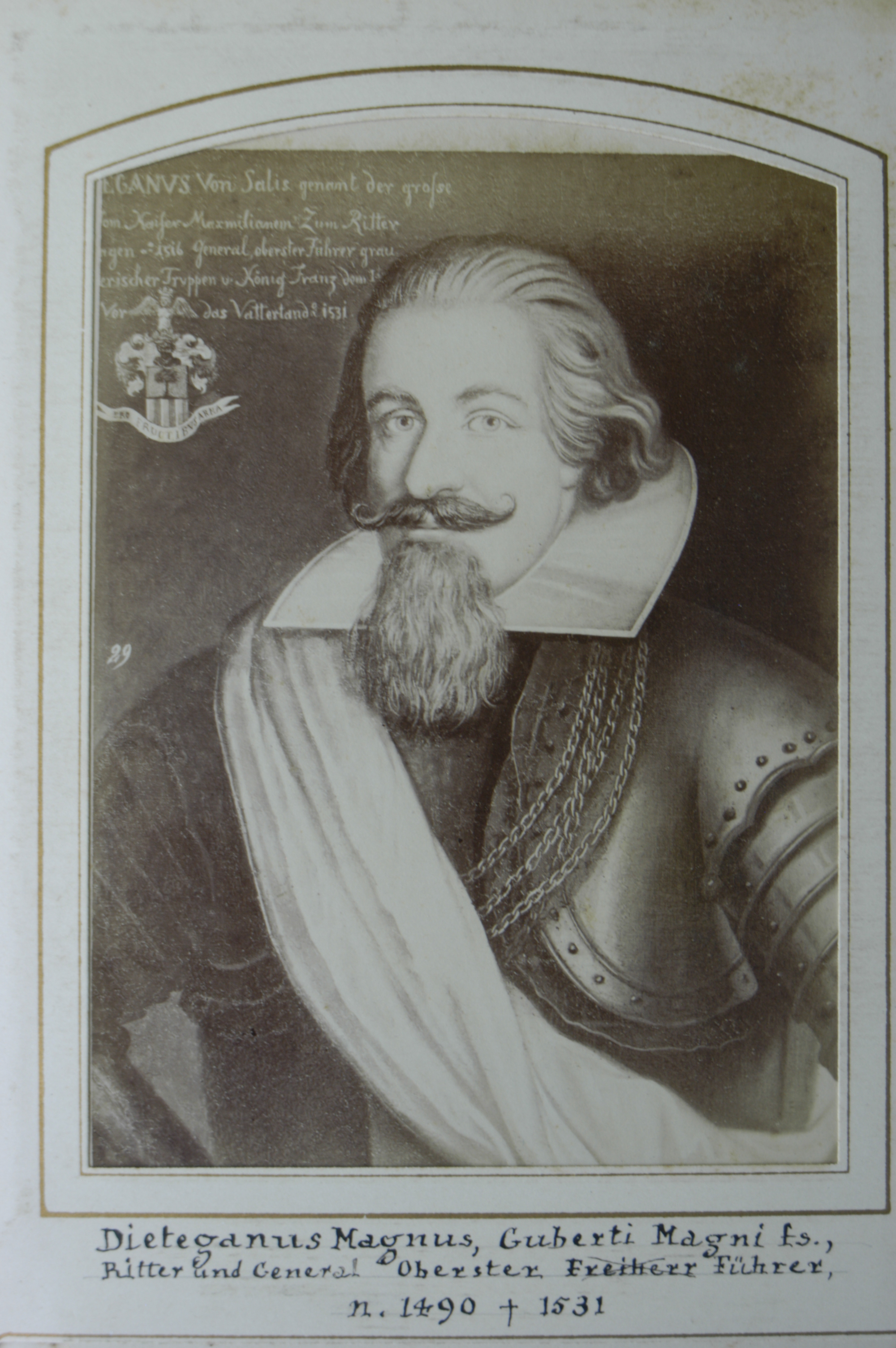
Dietegan Magnus à Salis (1473–1531), founder of the House of Salis-Seewis: .

Count de Salis-Seewis (also written Comte or Graf v. Salis-Seewis / Graf Salis-Seewis / Graf Salis / Gräfin ["Countess"] von Salis / Graf von Salis) is a primogenitive title created in Versailles, France, on 1 February 1777, while the title Graf (to follow the Count) was created in Vienna, Austria, 16 March 1915.

== Comtes de Salis-Seewis (1777–1915) ==
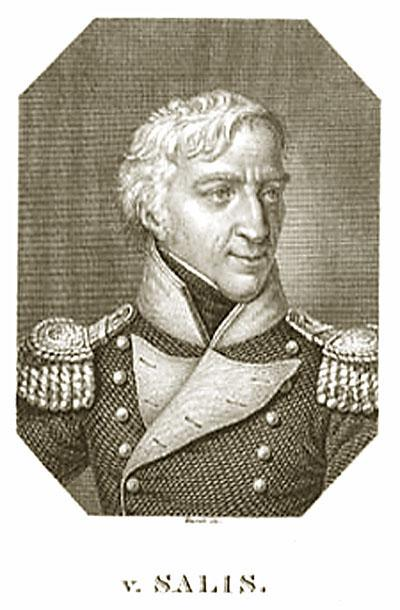
Johann Gaudenz Gubert, second Count de Salis-Seewis. Soldier, statesman, and lieder writer or lyricist.

- 1) Johann Ulrich Dietegan (1740–1815), married (1760) Jakobea von Salis-Bothmar (1741–1791); 1st Count;
- 2) Johann Gaudenz Gubert, (Malans 1762 - Malans 1834), poet, married Ursina von Pestalozzi; 2nd Count;
- 3) Johann-Ulrich Dietegan (Chur 1794– Modena 1844), married Barbara von Cleric; 3rd Comte;
- 4) (kaiserlich und königlich Hauptmann) Johann Gaudenz Gubert Dietegen (Malans 26.1.1824–1873), married (Agram 1857) Wilhelmine von Vranyczany-Dobrinović (Severin/Agram 1839 - Karlstadt 28.12.1898), daughter of Ambros von Vranyczany-Dobrinović by Julie Tompa de Horsova; 4th Count;

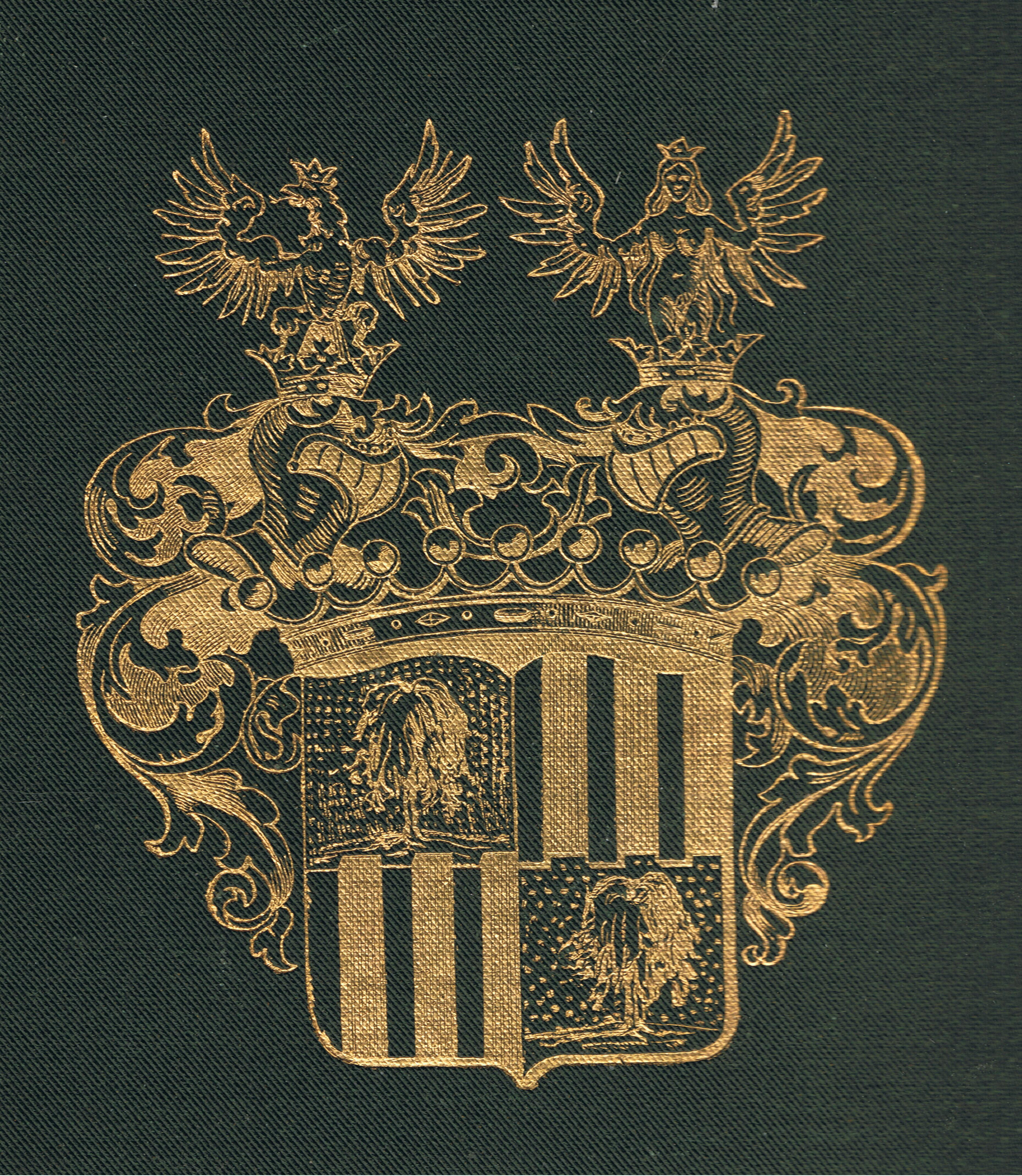
Arms of Johann Gaudenz v Salis-Seewis : Salis-Seewis impaling, or quartered with, Salis-Bothmar. From an 1889 book cover, Adolf Frey's biography of the poet.

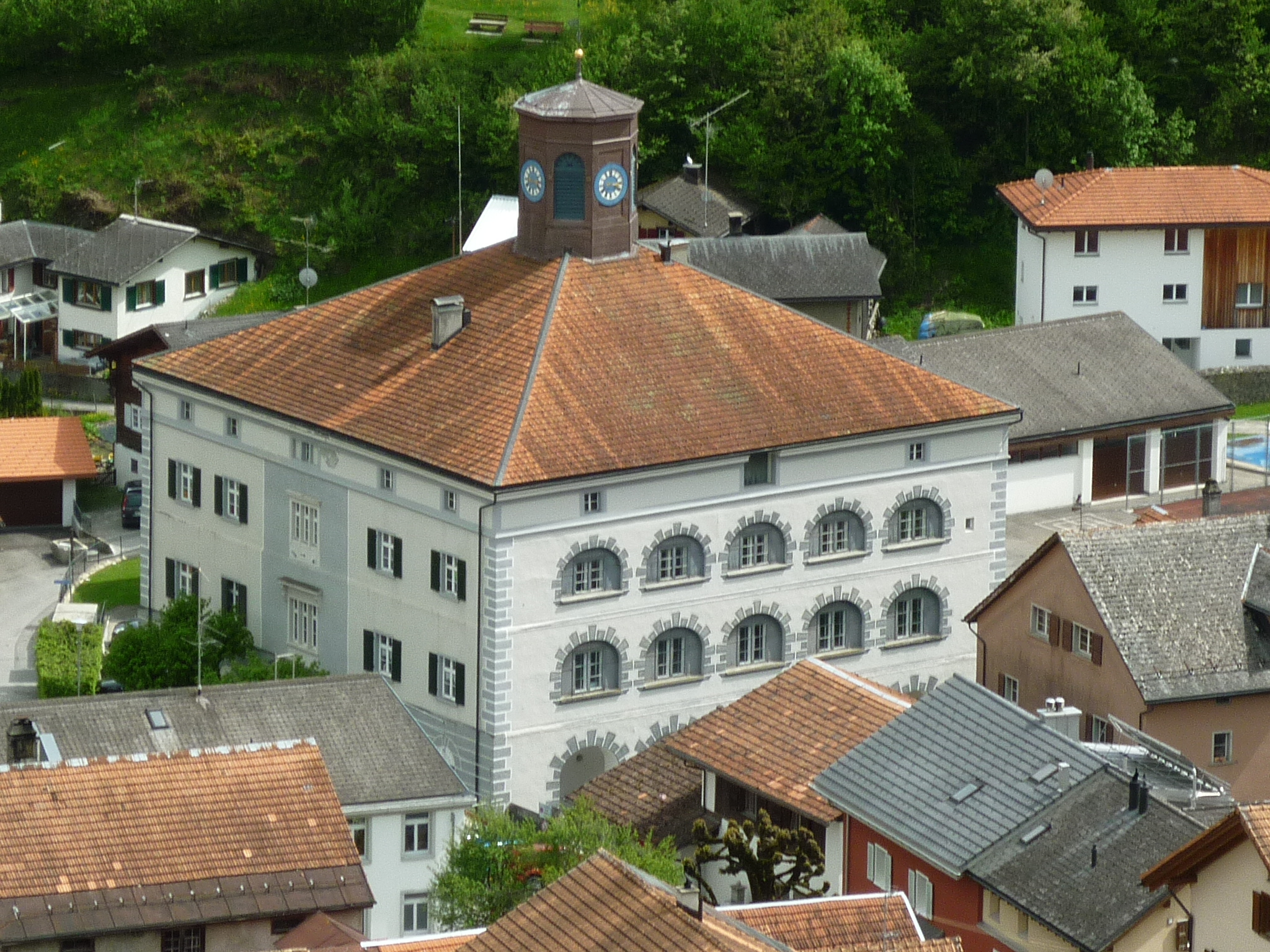
Salishaus in Seewis.

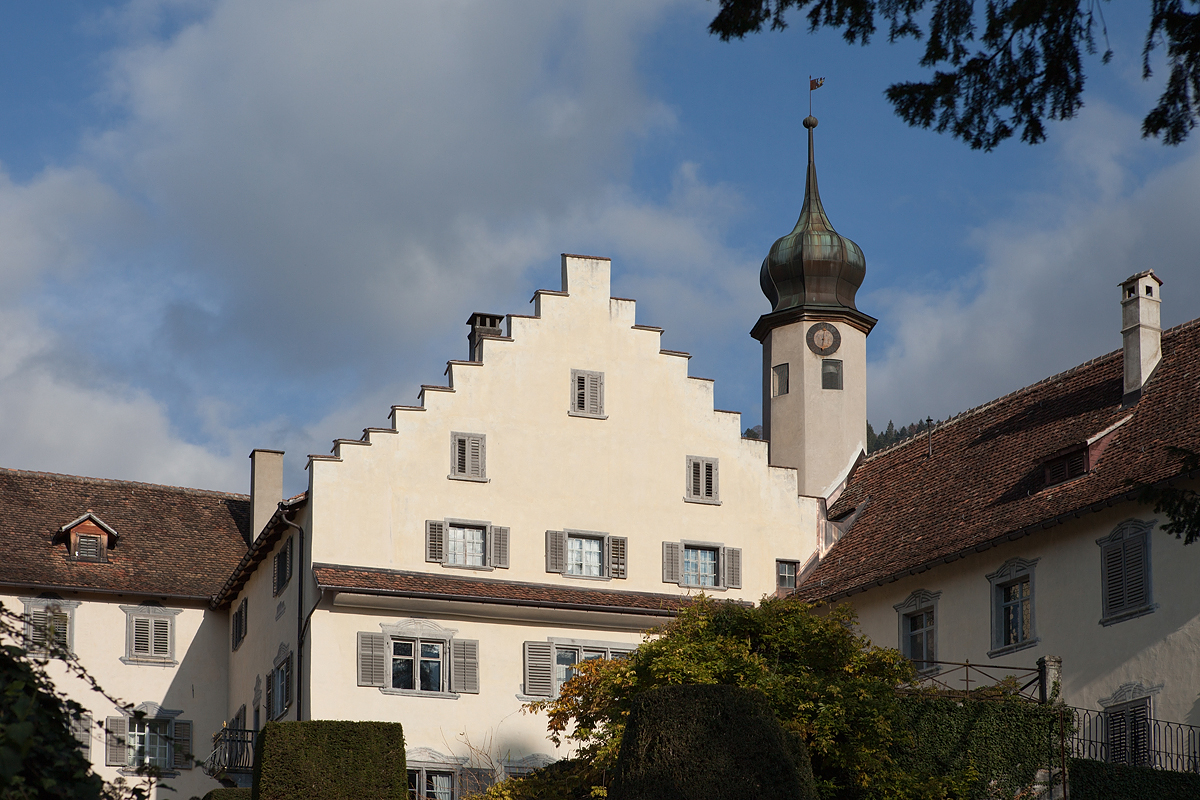
Bothmar Castle at Malans, Switzerland, current seat of the Counts de Salis-Seewis

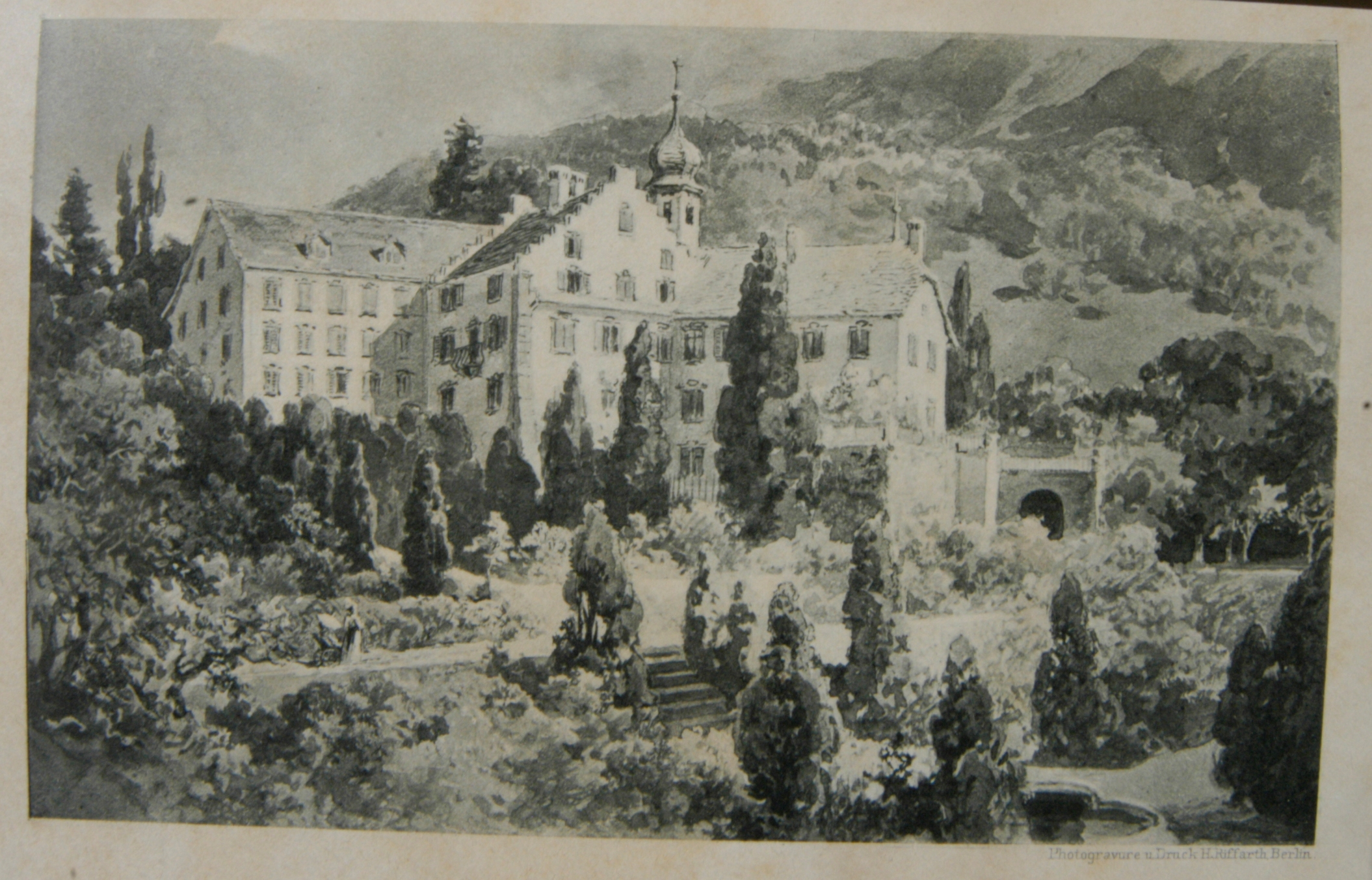
Bothmar, Malans, engraving from Adolf Frey's book, 1889.

== Counts of Salis-Seewis (after 1915) ==
- 5) Feldzeugmeister Johann Ulrich Graf von Salis-Seewis (Karlovac 1862 — Zagreb 1940); Military Governor of MGG/S Serbia, (1 January — 6 July 1916) buried at Mirogoj Cemetery, Zagreb, Yugoslavia; 5th Count, 1st Graf;
- 6) Johann Gaudenz Peter Dietegan, (*Malans 4.3.1866-Zagreb 11.8.1941), married (Vienna 17.4.1899) Marie v. Liebenberg de Zsittin (Königsberg 1876-), daughter of Adolf von Liebenberg; lived in Salzburg. 6th Comte, 2nd Graf;
- 7) (His Excellency Monseignor) Francesco/Franjo/Franz Emil Dietegan (Karlovac/Karlstadt 15.1.1872–27.10.1967), Auxiliary Bishop of Zagreb/Agram, Yugoslavia, 1926–1967; critic of attempts to reconcile Catholic doctrine with evolution; 7th Count, 3rd Graf;
- 8) (Dr.) Hans-Wolf Wolf Eugen Rudolf (Malans 17.5.1887–1959), I.C.R.C.; married (Bern, 8.6.1895) Marguerite Freiin v. Salis-Soglio, daughter of Ferdinand Freiherr von Salis-Soglio by Elizabeth v. Muralt; 8th Count, 4th Graf;
- 9) Franz Ferdinand Rudolf Dietegan (Samedan 9.8.1921 - New York 24.1.2000), of West Caldwell, New Jersey; married (Zurich 19.5.1951) Evelyne Patricia Iselin (17.04.1926-), daughter of Henry Iselin of Hewlett Harbor, L.I., a former senior partner of Rusch & Company Factors in New York; 9th Count, 5th Graf;
- 10) Johann-Gaudenz Ulrich Dietegan (born 1936, Samedan), married Isabelle v. Graffenreid; 10th Count, 6th Graf. Swiss diplomat and ambassador.

Motto: Non auro sed virtute.

'Nächster Anwärter auf den Grafentitel' (next contender): Friedrich Heinrich Dietegan (born 1968).

== Ancestor table of present Comte ==
Some of Gaudenz de Salis' ancestors
Johann-Gaudenz Ulrich Dietegan	Hans-Wolf Eugen Rudolf v. Salis-Seewis (Malans 1887-)	Johann Ulrich Dietegan Freiherr v. Salis-Seewis (Chur 1838-Malans 1921)	Johann-Jakob Freiherr v. Salis-Seewis (Zurich 1800-Chur 1881)
Johann-Gaudenz Ulrich Dietegan	Hans-Wolf Eugen Rudolf v. Salis-Seewis (Malans 1887-)	Johann Ulrich Dietegan Freiherr v. Salis-Seewis (Chur 1838-Malans 1921)	Anna Barbara v. Jenatsch (Chur 1800–1856)
Johann-Gaudenz Ulrich Dietegan	Hans-Wolf Eugen Rudolf v. Salis-Seewis (Malans 1887-)	Klara Maria Freiin v. Salis-Soglio (Turin 1855-Munich 1933),	Peter Rudolf v. Salis-Soglio, of Genua (Chur 1827-)
Johann-Gaudenz Ulrich Dietegan	Hans-Wolf Eugen Rudolf v. Salis-Seewis (Malans 1887-)	Klara Maria Freiin v. Salis-Soglio (Turin 1855-Munich 1933),	Anna Luise v. Muralt (Bevers 2.2.1830-Turin 1889)
Johann-Gaudenz Ulrich Dietegan	Marguerite Freiin v. Salis-Soglio (Bern 1895-),	Ferdinand Freiherr v. Salis-Soglio, of Paspels (Chur 1864-)	Anton v. Salis-Soglio (Chur 1819–1901)
Johann-Gaudenz Ulrich Dietegan	Marguerite Freiin v. Salis-Soglio (Bern 1895-),	Ferdinand Freiherr v. Salis-Soglio, of Paspels (Chur 1864-)	Henriette Margerete v. Planta-Reichenau (Chur 1823–1893)
Johann-Gaudenz Ulrich Dietegan	Marguerite Freiin v. Salis-Soglio (Bern 1895-),	Elisabeth Marie Esther v. Muralt (Bern 1875-),	Alex Ludwig Gotlieb v. Muralt (Bern 1829–1909)
Johann-Gaudenz Ulrich Dietegan	Marguerite Freiin v. Salis-Soglio (Bern 1895-),	Elisabeth Marie Esther v. Muralt (Bern 1875-),	Natalie v. Tavel (Bern 1836–1903)
