= Bunt sind schon die Wälder =

German Volkslied

- Volkslied
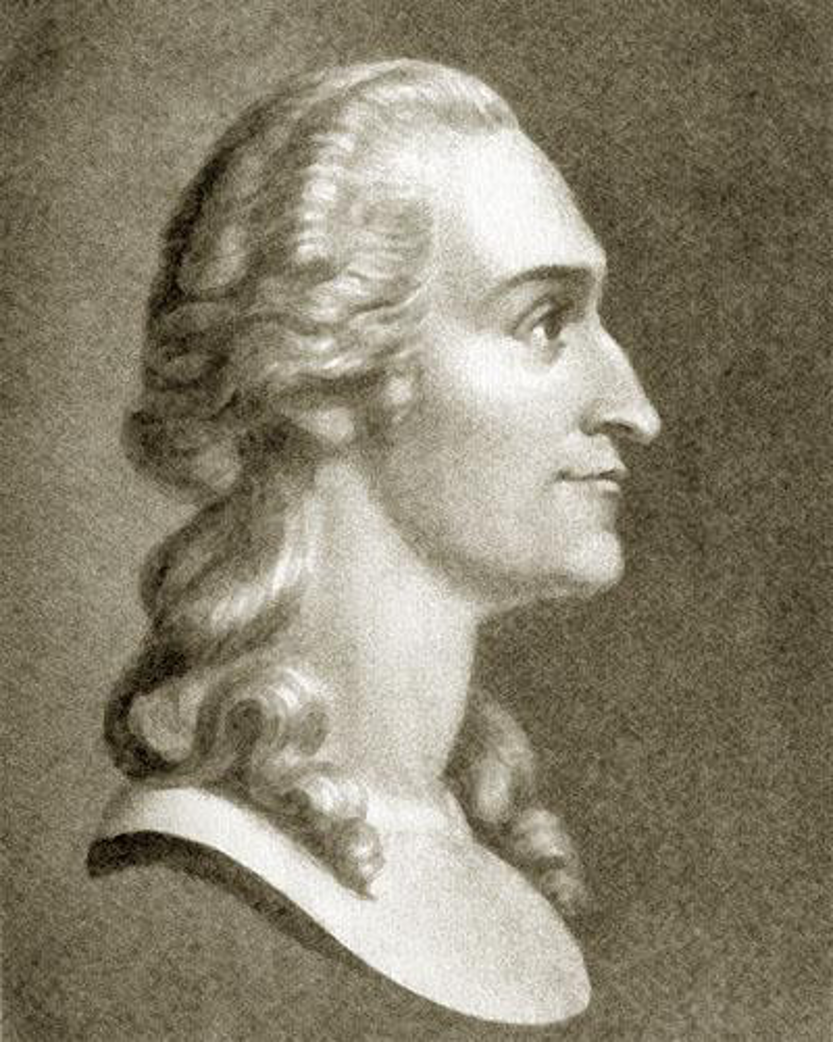
- Gaudenz, the text author
- Other name: "Herbstlied"
- Written: 1782
- Text: by Johann Gaudenz von Salis-Seewis
- Melody: by Johann Friedrich Reichardt
- Composed: 1799

"Bunt sind schon die Wälder" (Colourful are the forests already) is a popular Volkslied in German dealing with autumn. It is also known as "Herbstlied" (Autumn song). The text was written in 1782 by the Swiss poet Johann Gaudenz von Salis-Seewis, first published in 1786. The music was composed in 1799 by Johann Friedrich Reichardt, while Franz Schubert wrote a different setting in 1816. The song has remained popular, frequently sung, printed and recorded.

== History ==
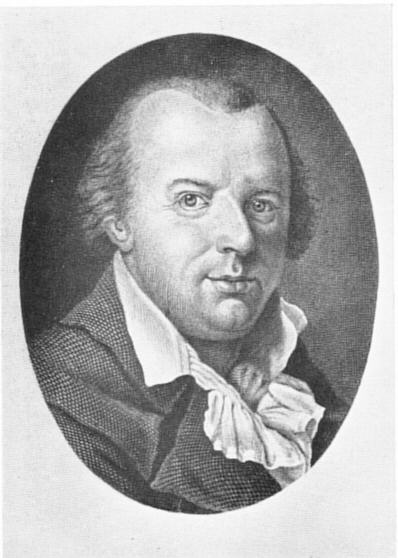
Reichardt, composer of the melody that became popular

The text of the song "Bunt sind schon die Wälder" was written in 1782 by the Swiss poet Johann Gaudenz von Salis-Seewis and first published with the title "Herbstlied" (Autumn song) and subtitle "1782" in the Vossischer Musen-Almanach für das Jahr 1786. Originally, it had seven stanzas. Another publication in 1793 contained five stanzas, the first two and the last being identical. The melody that became popular was composed in 1799 by Johann Friedrich Reichardt. In 1816 Franz Schubert wrote a different setting, (D502). In modern collections, the song usually has four stanzas, including the three which were identical. The original last line, "deutschen Ringeltanz" (German round dance), has often been changed to versions not limited to "German", such as "frohen Erntetanz" (happy harvest dance).

The song was published in many songbooks, including collections for children and schools. It appeared in Als der Großvater die Großmutter nahm (1885), Volkstümliche Lieder der Deutschen (1895), Schulgesangbuch für höhere Lehranstalten (1912), Lieder für höhere Mädchenschulen (1919, Schubert version), Liederbuch des Thüringerwald-Vereins (1927), Wir singen and Das große Liederbuch, among others; it became a popular Volkslied. The widest distribution occurred after 1950. In 2004 the song was included in a collection of 80 popular Volkslieder in book and CDs. When the broadcaster MDR ran a poll in 2011 to find the "most beautiful Volkslied", giving a choice of 20, it came in second of 171 additional listener suggestions. The song was included as the first autumn song in the collection Die schönsten Lieder, again of book and CDs, of 180 songs in a joint project of Carus-Verlag and SWR in 2017.

A version in English, a free adaptation of the text to Reichardt's melody entitled "Autumnal song", appeared in an American school songbook in 1845, but the song found limited distribution in English.

== Text ==
"Bunt sind schon die Wälder" was originally written in seven stanzas of six lines each, rhyming AABCCB. The song describes idyllic images of autumn landscape, harvest of grapes and peaches, and harvest celebration. The only hint in the original version at the fact that harvest was hard work was left out in the shorter version that became popular.

The four stanzas in modern collections are:

1. Bunt sind schon die Wälder,
gelb die Stoppelfelder,
und der Herbst beginnt.
Rote Blätter fallen,
graue Nebel wallen,
kühler weht der Wind.

2. Wie die volle Traube
aus dem Rebenlaube
purpurfarbig strahlt!
Am Geländer reifen
Pfirsiche, mit Streifen
rot und weiß bemalt.

3. Flinke Träger springen,
und die Mädchen singen,
alles jubelt froh!
Bunte Bänder schweben
zwischen hohen Reben
auf dem Hut von Stroh.

4. Geige tönt und Flöte
bei der Abendröte
und im Mondesglanz;
junge Winzerinnen
winken und beginnen
frohen Erntetanz. (Note: originally: deutschen Ringeltanz)

Colourful are the forests already,
Yellow are the stubble fields
And autumn begins.
Red leaves fall,
The gray mist billows,
The wind blows cooler.

How the ripe grapes
On the vines
Gleam in purple color!
On the trellis, mature
Peaches with stripes
Colored red and white.

Nimble porters jump,
And the girls sing,
Everyone cheers happily!
Colorful ribbons float
Among the high vines
From the straw hat.

The violin and the flute sound
At sunset
And in the moonlight.
Young winemakers
Wave and begin
A happy harvest dance.

=== Variants ===
The theologian Theodor Fliedner published a version in a collection for the education of small children, Lieder-Buch für Kleinkinder-Schulen, which replaced the final stanza by thanks to God for the gifts of the harvest:

Dank für alle Gaben,
die Du, uns zu laben,
schenkst für unsre Not!
Wollen Dich nun loben
hier, und einstens droben,
lieber Herr und Gott!

Thanks for all gifts
that you, to refresh us,
gives for our hardship!
We want to praise you now
here, and one day above,
dear Lord and God!

Several editions of Christian song books (in German) in the United States from the 19th century closed the song similarly by Fliedner's stanza, sometimes preceded by another stanza of similar content, such as Sonntagsschul-Gesangbuch der Reformirten Kirche in den Vereinigten Staaten from 1876, Unser Liederbuch: die schönsten Lieder für Schule, Sonntagsschule und Familie from 1893, and Liederbuch für Sonntagschulen of the Evangelical Synod of North America, 1898.

== Melodies ==
The first setting of "Herbstlied" was published in 1785 by Johann Georg Witthauer, in volume two of his collection, Sammlung vermischter Clavier- und Singstücke.

The 1793 version in five stanzas was set by several composers. Peter Grønland wrote a version published in Notenbuch zum Akademischen Liederbuch in 1796, Friedrich Ludwig Seidel composed a setting that appeared first in Lieder geselliger Freude in 1779 and from 1799 in several edition of Mildheimisches Liederbuch. Johann Friedrich Reichardt wrote a version that first appeared in Liederbuch für die Jugend in 1799. It followed the time's ideal of a simple art song in folk style.; he had written in 1782, in an article of the Musikalisches Kunstmagazin magazine, that it was the highest and most difficult objective of a composer to "make a song in true folk spirit" ("ein Lied in wahrem Volksinn zu machen"). His melody for the song, described as swinging and dance-like, has remained popular.

Hans Georg Nägeli created a version in 1810, and Schubert his in 1816, D 502. The music by both Schubert and Reichardt was often recorded.
