= History of German =

The appearance of the German language begins in the Early Middle Ages with the High German consonant shift. Old High German, Middle High German, and Early New High German span the duration of the Holy Roman Empire. The 19th and 20th centuries saw the rise of Standard German and a decrease of dialectal variety.

== High German ==
=== Old High German ===
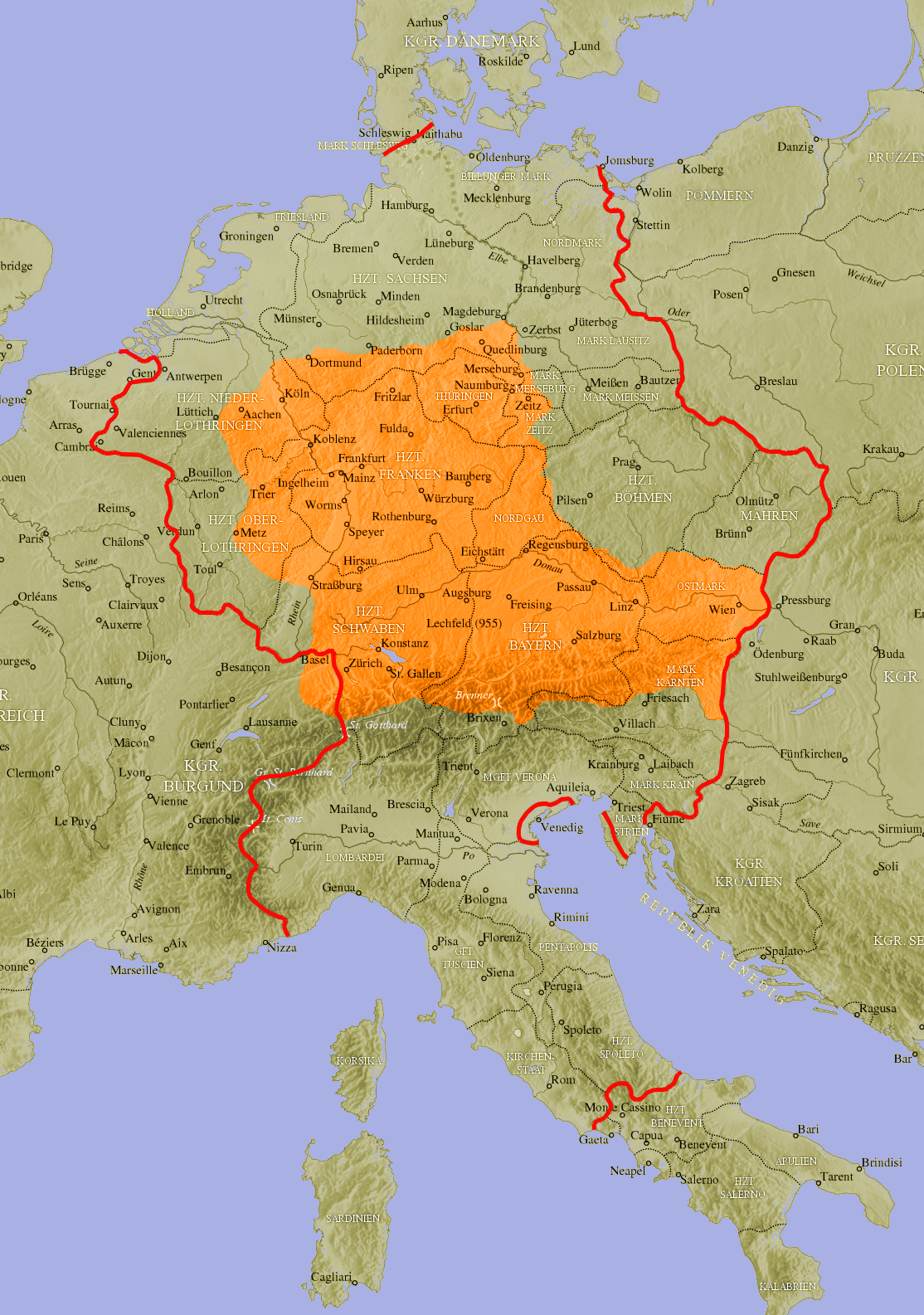
The Old High German speaking area within the Holy Roman Empire in 962

The earliest testimonies of Old High German are from scattered Elder Futhark inscriptions, especially in Alemannic, from the 6th century, the earliest glosses (Abrogans) date to the 8th and the oldest coherent texts (the Hildebrandslied, the Muspilli and the Merseburg Incantations) to the 9th century.

=== Middle High German ===
Middle High German (MHG, German Mittelhochdeutsch) is the term used for the period in the history of the German language between 1050 and 1350. It is preceded by Old High German and followed by Early New High German. In some older scholarship, the term covers a longer period, going up to 1500.

=== Early New High German ===
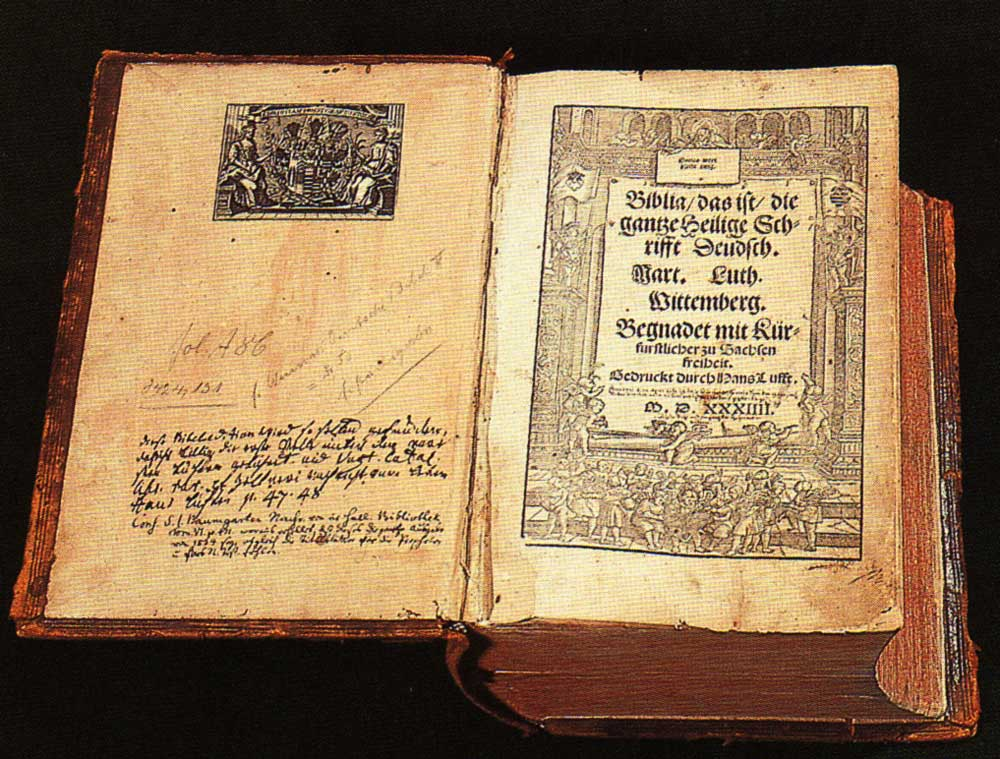
Modern High German translation of the Christian Bible by the Protestant reformer Martin Luther (1534). The widespread popularity of the Bible translated into High German by Luther helped establish modern Standard High German.

When the Protestant reformer Martin Luther translated the Bible into High German (the New Testament was published in 1522; the Old Testament was published in parts and completed in 1534) he based his translation mainly on this already developed language, which was the most widely understood language at this time. This language was based on Eastern Upper and Eastern Central German dialects and preserved much of the grammatical system of Middle High German (unlike the spoken German dialects in Central and Upper Germany that at that time had already begun to lose the genitive case and the preterite).

Luther based his translation primarily on the Meißner Deutsch of Saxony, spending much time among the population of Saxony researching the dialect so as to make the work as natural and accessible to German speakers as possible. Copies of Luther's Bible featured a long list of glosses for each region, translating words which were unknown in the region into the regional dialect. Luther said the following concerning his translation method:

One who would talk German does not ask the Latin how he shall do it; he must ask the mother in the home, the children on the streets, the common man in the market-place and note carefully how they talk, then translate accordingly. They will then understand what is said to them because it is German. When Christ says 'ex abundantia cordis os loquitur,' I would translate, if I followed the papists, aus dem Überflusz des Herzens redet der Mund. But tell me is this talking German? What German understands such stuff? No, the mother in the home and the plain man would say, Wesz das Herz voll ist, des gehet der Mund über.

Luther's translation of the Bible into High German was also decisive for the German language and its evolution from Early New High German to Modern Standard German. The publication of Luther's Bible was a decisive moment in the spread of literacy in early modern Germany, and promoted the development of non-local forms of language and exposed all speakers to forms of German from outside their own area.

In the beginning, copies of the Bible had a long list for each region, which translated words unknown in the region into the regional dialect. Roman Catholics rejected Luther's translation at first and tried to create their own Catholic standard (gemeines Deutsch)—which, however, differed from "Protestant German" only in some minor details. It took until the middle of the 18th century to create a standard that was widely accepted, thus ending the period of Early New High German.

== Low German ==
Low German, being at the crossroads between High German, Anglo-Frisian, Low Franconian and the South Jutlandic dialect of Danish, has a less clear-cut linguistic history, epitomizing the fact that the West Germanic group is really a dialect continuum.

Low German, which is often considered to be a distinct language from both German and Dutch, was the historical language of most of northern Germany. While Old Saxon and Middle Low German are totally recognized as Independent languages, the status of modern Low German is not that clear, because it is no Ausbaulanguage.

Low German was displaced by High German during the duration of the Holy Roman Empire. After the end of the Hanseatic League in the 17th century, Low German was marginalized to the status of local dialects.

=== Old Saxon ===
Old Saxon, also known as Old Low German, is a West Germanic language. It is documented from the 9th century until the 12th century, when it evolved into Middle Low German. It was spoken on the north-west coast of Germany and in Denmark by Saxon peoples. It is closely related to Old Anglo-Frisian (Old Frisian, Old English), partially participating in the Ingvaeonic nasal spirant law.

=== Middle Low German ===
The Middle Low German language is an ancestor of the modern Low German. It was spoken from about 1100 to 1500, splitting into West Low German and East Low German. The neighbour languages within the dialect continuum of the West Germanic languages were Middle Dutch in the West and Middle High German in the South, later substituted by Early New High German. Middle Low German was the lingua franca of the Hanseatic League, spoken all around the North Sea and the Baltic Sea. Based on the language of Lübeck, a standardized written language was developing, though it was never codified.

== 19th century ==
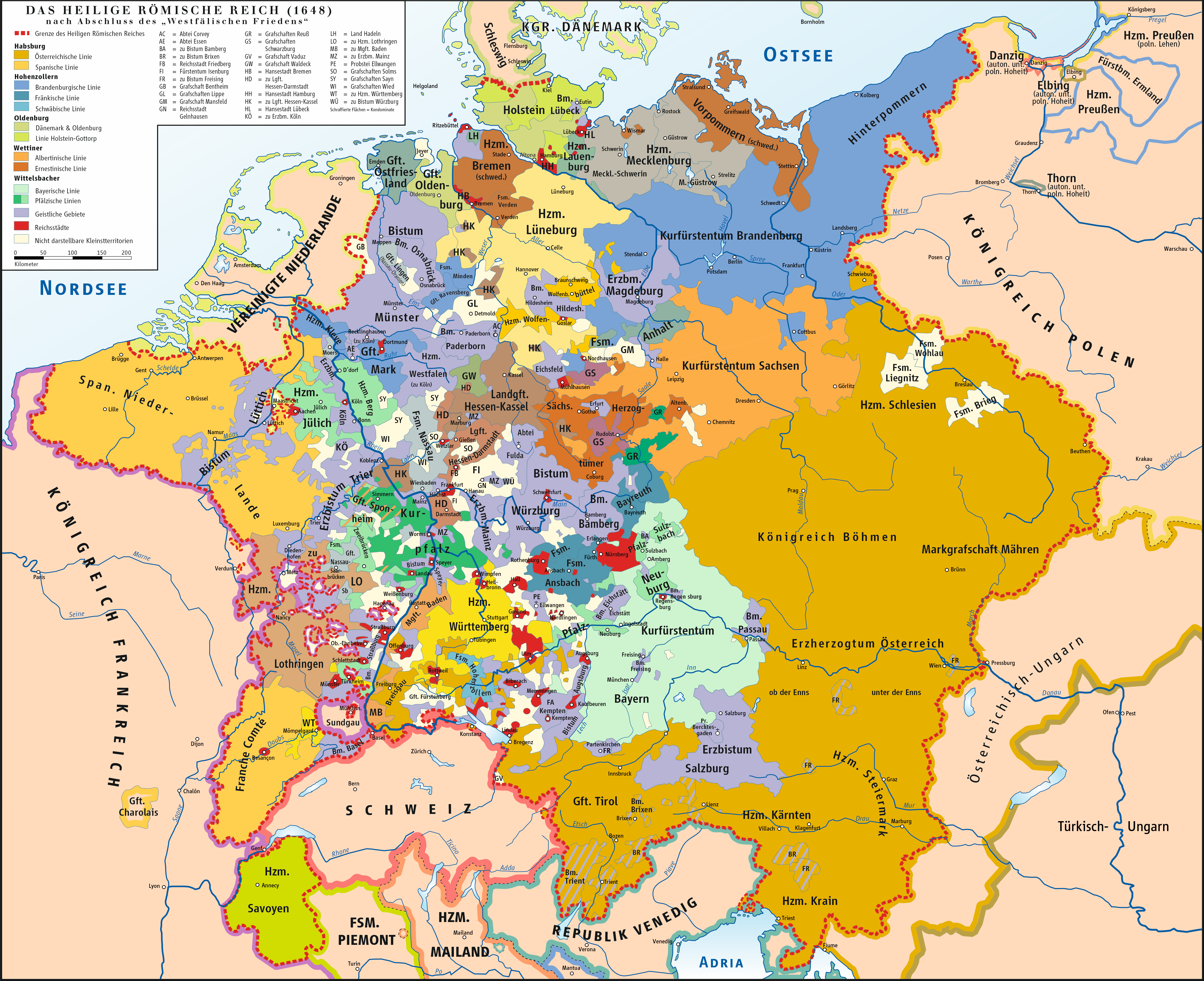
Map of Central Europe in 1648: Territories under the Holy Roman Empire, comprising the Alpine heartland (Erblande) of the Habsburg monarchy.

German was the language of commerce and government in the Habsburg Empire, which encompassed a large area of Central and Eastern Europe. Until the mid-19th century it was essentially the language of townspeople throughout most of the Empire. It indicated that the speaker was a merchant and an urbanite, not his nationality. Some cities, such as Budapest (Buda, German: Ofen), were gradually Germanized in the years after their incorporation into the Habsburg domain. Others, such as Bratislava (German: Pressburg), were originally settled during the Habsburg period and were primarily German at that time. A few cities such as Milan (German: Mailand) remained primarily non-German. However, most cities were primarily German at least during the early part of the century, such as Prague, Budapest, Bratislava, Zagreb (German: Agram), and Ljubljana (German: Laibach), though they were surrounded by territory where other languages were spoken.

Until about 1800, standard German was almost solely a written language. At this time, people in urban northern Germany, who spoke dialects very different from Standard German, learnt it almost as a foreign language and tried to pronounce it as close to the spelling as possible. Prescriptive pronunciation guides of that time considered northern German pronunciation to be the standard. However, the actual pronunciation of standard German varied from region to region. German was also used in the Baltic governates of the Russian Empire. For example, Riga employed German as its official language of administration until the installation of Russian in 1891. Similarly, Tallinn employed German until 1889.

Media and written works are almost all produced in standard German (often called Hochdeutsch in German), which is understood in all German-speaking areas (except by pre-school children in areas where only dialect is spoken, for example Switzerland—but in this age of television, even they now usually learn to understand Standard German before school age). The first dictionary of the Brothers Grimm, which was issued in 16 parts between 1852 and 1860, remains the most comprehensive guide to the lexicon of the German language.

== 20th century ==
Current distribution areas of the German language in Europe

In 1880, grammatical and orthographic rules first appeared in the Duden Handbook. In 1901, this was declared the standard definition of the German language. Standard German orthography subsequently went essentially unrevised until 1998, when the German spelling reform of 1996 was officially promulgated by government representatives of Germany, Austria, Liechtenstein, and Switzerland. After the reform, German spelling underwent an eight-year transitional period, during which the reformed spelling was taught in most schools, while traditional and reformed spelling co-existed in the media.

During the late 19th century, German displaced Latin as the lingua franca of Western science, and remained the primary language of science through the first half of the 20th century. Many of the greatest scientific papers of that era were first published in the German language, such as Albert Einstein's Annus Mirabilis papers of 1905.

Everything changed with the end of World War II. After 1945, one-third of all German researchers and teachers had to be laid off because they were tainted by their involvement with the Third Reich; another third had already been expelled or killed by the Nazi regime; and another third were simply too old. The result was that a new generation of relatively young and untrained German academics were faced with the enormous task of rebuilding German science during the Reconstruction era in post-war Germany (1945–1990). By then, "Germany, German science, and German as the language of science had all lost their leading position in the scientific community."

== See also ==
- German language literature
- German dialects
- Standard German
- German as a minority language
- Ethnic Germans

== Bibliography ==
- Keller, R.E. (1979). The German Language. London: Faber and Faber. ISBN 0-571-11159-9.
- Salmons, Joseph (2012). A History of German: What the Past Reveals about Today's Language. Oxford: Oxford University Press. ISBN 978-0199697946.
- Super, Charles W. (1893). A history of the German language. University of California Libraries. Columbus, Ohio: Hann & Adair.
- Waterman, John T. (1976). A History of the German Language (Revised ed.). University of Washington Press. ISBN 0-295-73807-3.
- Wells, C. J. (1987). German: A Linguistic History to 1945. Oxford University Press. ISBN 0-19-815809-2.
- Young, Christopher; Gloning, Thomas (2004). A History of the German Language through texts. London, New York: Routledge. ISBN 0-415-18331-6.
