= Liebenberg v The Master =

South African legal case

In Liebenberg v The Master, an important case in South African succession law, the testator signed his will (which was one page long) at the top of the page and not the bottom. The court held that the will was valid, as the Wills Act does not specify where on the page the signature must be- just that every page must be signed.

== See also ==
- South African succession law
