= Graines Castle =

Castle in Val d'Ayas, Aosta Valley, Italy

Coordinates: 45°44′18″N 7°45′16″E

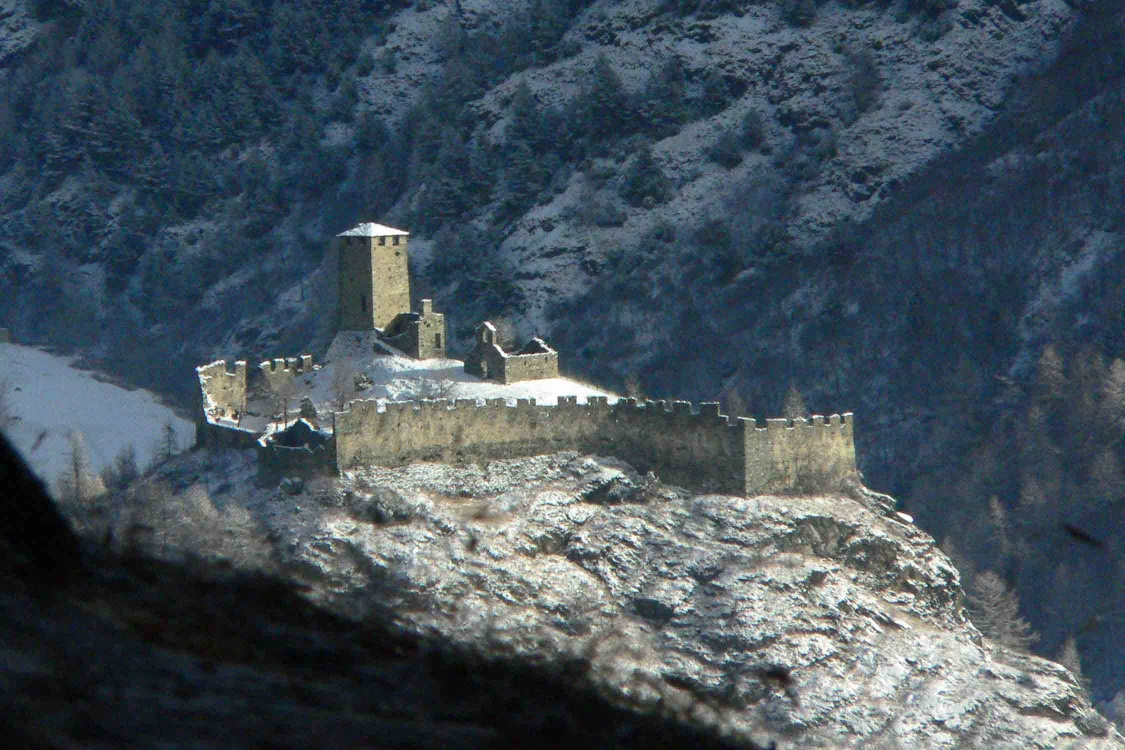
Graines Castle

The Castle of Graines is a castle in Val d'Ayas, located near the village with the same name in the municipality of Brusson, Aosta Valley, northern Italy.

It occupies the summit of a rocky spur which commands Brusson and most of the Val d'Ayas. In medieval times, it communicated through flag or mirror messages with the nearby Bonot Tower and the Villa Castle in Challand-Saint-Victor.

According to a legend, a large treasure lies buried under the castle.

== History ==
The fief of Graines is documented since 515, when King Sigismund of Burgundy donated it to the newly formed Abbey of St. Maurice. The castle was perhaps built in the 11th century by its monks, who built the Romanesque chapel which is still visible in the interior.

In 1263 the abbey sold the fief to Godefroi of Challant, a faithful vassal of the House of Savoy, whose family held the castle until the 18th century. The castle was a stronghold of Catherine of Challant in her struggle for the family's inheritance. When the Challant disappeared in the 19th century, the castle was bought by Passerin d'Entrèves family, who later sold it to the commune of Brusson. The castle was restored in the early 20th century by Alfredo d'Andrade and Giuseppe Giacosa.

== Description ==
The castle had the typical layout of Aosta Valley early medieval castles. It had an irregular line of walls measuring c. 80 x 50 m, which housed a series of structures such as the large donjon (square tower) and a small chapel, the only ones remaining now.

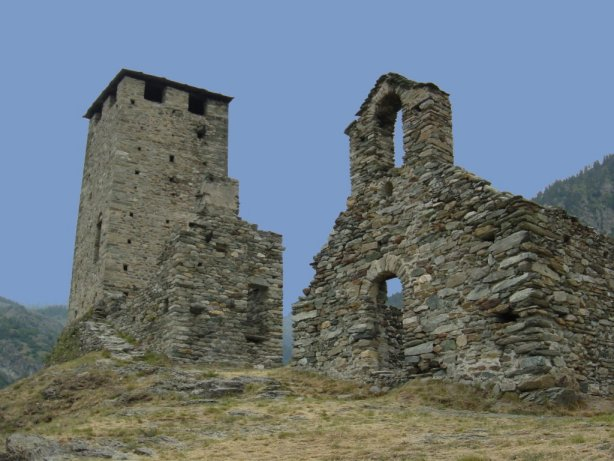
The donjon and the chapel.

The donjon is square in plan, with a side of more than 5.5 m. It was the castle's keep and the residence of the castellan or the lord. The entrance was at some five metres from the ground, and could be accessed only by a ladder which could be removed during sieges. A wing was later added to enlarge the tower.

The Romanesque chapel, dedicated to St. Martin, has a single nave with a length of eight metres, ending in a semicircular apse. The ceiling had crumbled down.
