= Adolf von Liebenberg =

Austrian agriculturalist

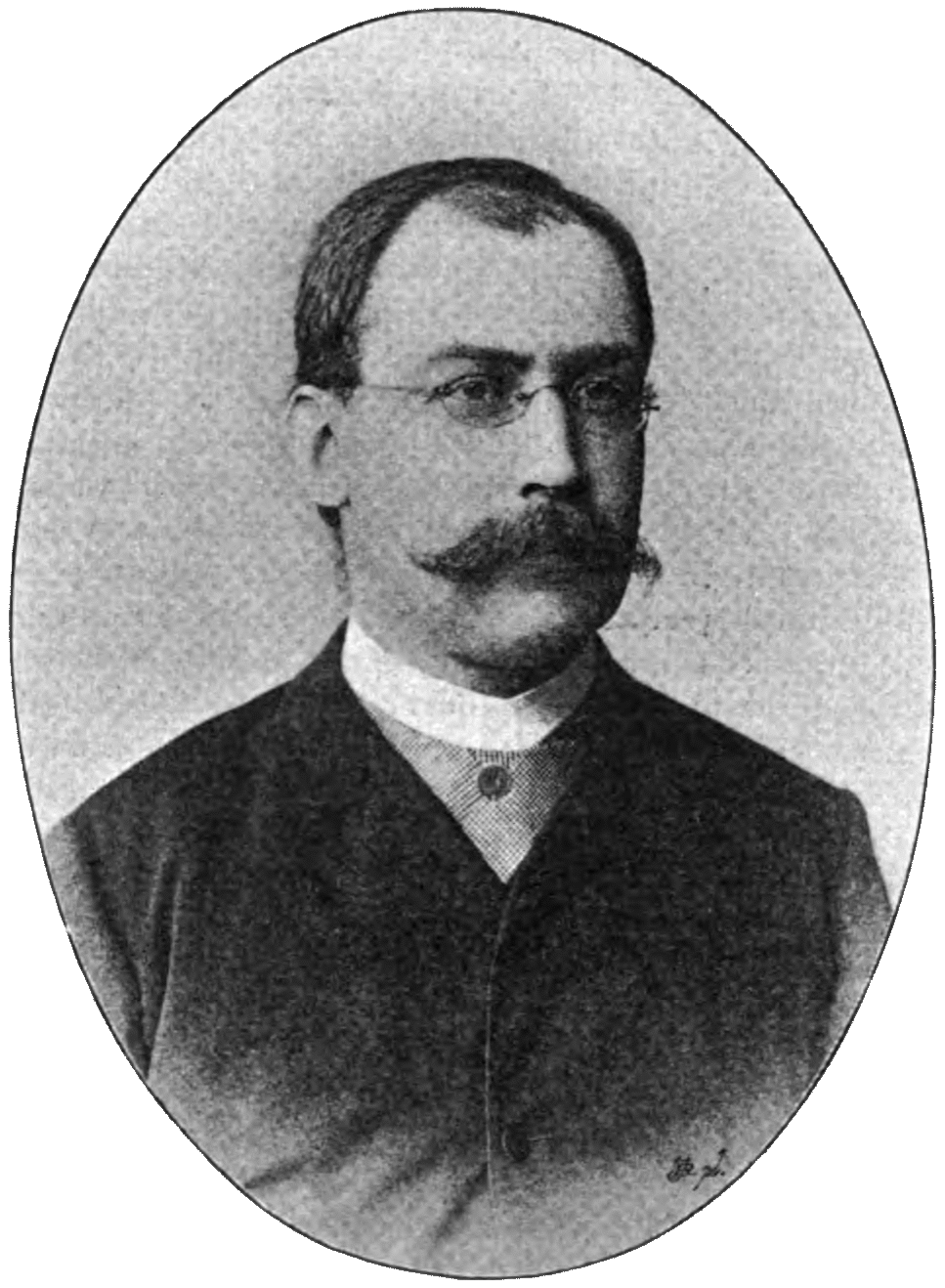
Adolf von Liebenberg

Ritter Adolf von Liebenberg or Liebenberg von Zsittin (September 15, 1851, in Como, Lombardy, Austrian Empire – May 6, 1920, in Vienna) was an Austrian agriculturalist and researcher into crop production (Getreidewissenschaftler, Agrarfachmann). He taught at Königsberg University and Vienna.
